= 2025 Letran Knights basketball team =

Basketball team in the Philippines

2025 Letran Knights men's basketball

NCAA Season 101 runner-up

Record
- Elims rank: #3
- Final rank: #2
- 2025 record: 12-7 (8-5 elims)
- Head coach: Allen Ricardo (2nd season)
- Assistant coaches: Kris Reyes (First Assistant); Rey Nambatac; Michael Buendia; Beaujing Acot
- Captain: Mark Omega (4th season)

The 2025 Letran Knights men's basketball team represented Colegio de San Juan de Letran in the 101st season of the National Collegiate Athletic Association in the Philippines. The men's basketball tournament for the school year 2025-26 began on October 1, 2025, and the host school for the season is Mapúa University.

In a new tournament format introduced this season, the Knights were grouped alongside San Beda, CSB, JRU, and EAC.

The Knights finished the elimination round at third place in Group B with 8 wins and 5 losses. They returned to the Final Four after three years by defeating the Arellano Chiefs twice.

The Knights returned to the Finals for the first time in three years after beating top-seed Perpetual Altas in two games. However, they have failed to capture the title as the San Beda Red Lions defeat them in two games.

Letran rookie guard Jonathan Manalili was named the Rookie of the Year, Freshman of the Year, and Mythical Five member, while veteran big man Kevin Santos bagged the All-Defensive Team and Mythical Five honors.

== Coaching changes ==
Added to the team's assistant coaches is former Letran Knight John Carl "Kojack" Melegrito. Melegrito last played for the Knights during the tenure of Louie Alas.

== Roster changes ==
The Knights lost several players from previous season. Pao Javillonar graduated from college, while Kobe Monje will be ineligible to play due to his age. Javillanor is playing for Converge FiberXers in the PBA, while Monje was drafted in the 2025 PBA draft.

Rafael Go, CJ Delfino, and Edzel Galoy decided to forewent their eligibilities to turn professional. Go and Delfino are playing for their respective teams in Maharlika Pilipinas Basketball League, while Galoy is playing for Taguig Generals in NBL-Pilipinas.

Several key players from last season transferred to other schools. Filipino-American point guard Jace Miller decided to transfer to Lyceum of the Philippines University. Another guard, ex-Tiger Cub James Jumao-as, decided to return to University of Santo Tomas after playing for the Knights in two seasons. Joseph Nunag transferred to Emilio Aguinaldo College, while James Pradella and Mark Sarza both transferred to Centro Escolar University.

Among the rookies who will suit up for the Knights are Jonathan Manalili, Edry Alejandro, and Chad Gammad.

Manalili is a two-time NCAA Juniors Basketball champion from the Squires program. In NCAA Season 98, he averaged 16.08 points, 6.92 assists, 4.23 rebounds, and 2.46 steals per game. He was also named NCAA Finals MVP. Manalili was named the sixth best high school player for 2024 by the National Basketball Training Center.

Alejandro is 6'4 forward who was one of the key pieces of the UE Junior Warriors' title run in UAAP Season 87. He averaged 9.21 points on 44-percent shooting, 9.8 rebounds, 1.6 assists, and 1.1 steals. Like Manalili, Alejandro was also in the Top 24 best high school players in 2024 by NBTC, ranking 14th.

Chad Gammad is a Filipino-Canadian player who last played for Top Flight Hoops Canada in NBTC Division 2, where they won as champions. He was named in the Mythical team and averaged 31.2 points, including 44.2-percent from threes, 5.2 rebounds and 2.2 assists.

Other rookies include Syrex Silorio and Lex Gazzingan also from the Squires, Joss Poli from Lyceum Junior Pirates program, Elijah Yusi from the Arellano Braves, and Edvil Mundas, one of the key players behind Davao Region’s historic gold medal win in secondary boys basketball at the 2025 Palarong Pambansa.

Among the transferees who will play for the Knights are Mark Omega, Jun Roque, Peter Rosilio, Aaron Buensalida, and Luiz Tapenio.

Omega and Roque, who were also ex-Squires, both played as key players for the Perpetual Help Altas in NCAA Season 99. Roque was also recognized in that season, joining the Mythical team selection.

Rosilio last played for the Mapúa Cardinals in NCAA Season 99. He averaged 4.41 points, 3.06 rebounds, and 1.39 assists and was one of the key pieces of the Cardinals' Finals run in that season.

Buensalida last played for the De La Salle Green Archers in the UAAP for two seasons.

Tapenio last played for the St. Clare Colleges Saints in NAASCU, where they won their sixth consecutive championship crown.

== Roster ==
Letran Knights roster
Players
Coaches

Pos.	No.	Nat.	Name	Height	Year	High School
PF	6	(Philippines)	Alejandro, John Edry Cyrehl A.	6'4" (1.93m)	1	University of the East
G	91	(Philippines)	Baliling, Jovel	5'11" (1.8m)	2	Colegio de San Juan de Letran
F	14	(Philippines)	Buensalida, Aaron James	6'5" (1.96m)	1	Nazareth School-NU
G	29	(Philippines)	Cuajao, Vince Petdeo D.	6'1" (1.85m)	3	Holy Child College of Davao
G	26	(Philippines)	Estrada, John Sherick	6'0" (1.83m)	2	St. Clare College Caloocan
G	1	(Canada)	Gammad, Lorge Reinier B.	6'0" (1.83m)	1	A.R. MacNeill Secondary School
G	77	(Philippines)	Gazzingan, Alexandrei	6'2" (1.88m)	1	Colegio de San Juan de Letran
PG	13	(Philippines)	Manalili, Jonathan Moses	6'0" (1.83m)	1	Colegio de San Juan de Letran
PG	7	(Philippines)	Montecillo, Nathaniel	5'9" (1.75m)	2	UP Integrated School
SG	28	(Philippines)	Mundas, Edvil Christian	6'1" (1.85m)	1	Holy Child College of Davao
C	23	(Philippines)	Omega, Mark Denver (C)	6'5" (1.96m)	4	Colegio de San Juan de Letran
F	34	(Philippines)	Poli, Joss Matthew	6'3" (1.91m)	1	Lyceum of the Philippines University
SF	0	(Philippines)	Roque, Arthur II I.	6'4" (1.93m)	3	Colegio de San Juan de Letran
PG	11	(Philippines)	Rosilio, Peter Ryle	5'10" (1.78m)	2	Adamson University
C	4	(Philippines)	Santos, Kevin Kyle	6'6" (1.98m)	4	St. Augustine Institute of Pampanga
F	15	(Philippines)	Silorio, Syrex June	6'3" (1.91m)	1	Colegio de San Juan de Letran
F	5	(Philippines)	Tapenio, Luiz Gaveriel S.	6'2" (1.88m)	1	New Prodon Academy Valenzuela
G	18	(Philippines)	Yusi, Elijah Ray	6'2" (1.88m)	1	Arellano University

Head coach

- Joseph Allen Ricardo

Assistant coach(es)

- Kristoffer Reyes (First Assistant)
- Michael Gregg Buendia
- Rey Benedict Nambatac
- Beaujing Acot
- John Carl Melegrito
- Jinino Manansala
- Bong Solian
- Mac Villarba
- Melo Banua
- John Necesito

Strength & conditioning coach(es)

- Brian Cay

Team Staff

- Mark Anthony Guiao

Team manager

- John Paul Beltrano
- Seth Jarell Diamse (assistant)
- Joshua Railey Motio (assistant)

Legend

- (C) Team captain
- Injured

=== Depth chart ===
Pos.	Starting 5	Bench 1	Bench 2
C	Santos	Buensalida	Poli
PF	Omega	Tapenio	Silorio
SF	Roque	Cuajao	Gazzingan
SG	Gammad	Estrada	Yusi
PG	Manalili	Montecillo	Rosilio

== NCAA Season 101 games results ==
Elimination games are played in a revamped tournament format inspired by the NBA play-in tournament and the U.S. NCAA Division I men's basketball tournament. All games are aired on GTV and Heart of Asia Channel, and livestreamed via the Facebook pages and YouTube channels of NCAA Philippines and GMA Sports.

Date	Time	Opponent	Venue	Result	Record
Eliminations
Oct 3	2:30 p.m.	JRU Heavy Bombers	Playtime Filoil Centre • San Juan	L 69-73	0-1
Game Highs: Points: Estrada – 14; Rebounds: Santos – 11; Assists: Estrada – 4
Oct 5	2:30 p.m.	San Beda Red Lions	Playtime Filoil Centre • San Juan	L 58-68	0-2
Game Highs: Points: Manalili – 13; Rebounds: Tapenio – 8; Assists: Manalili – 6
Oct 8	2:30 p.m	Benilde Blazers	Playtime Filoil Centre • San Juan	L 80-95	0-3
Game Highs: Points: Manalili – 23; Rebounds: Manalili – 8; Assists: Manalili – 9
Oct 11	11:00 a.m.	EAC Generals	Mall of Asia Arena • Pasay	W 84-80	1-3
Game Highs: Points: Cuajao – 23; Rebounds: Buensalida – 11; Assists: Manalili – 13
Oct 15	2:30 p.m.	Perpetual Altas	Playtime Filoil Centre • San Juan	W 63-56	2-3
Game Highs: Points: Estrada – 23; Rebounds: Santos – 10; Assists: Manalili – 10
Oct 18	2:30 p.m.	Lyceum Pirates	Playtime Filoil Centre • San Juan	W 95-93^{OT}	3-3
Game Highs: Points: Santos – 16; Rebounds: Santos – 11; Assists: Manalili – 15
Oct 21	11:00 a.m.	Mapúa Cardinals	Playtime Filoil Centre • San Juan	W 85-82^{OT}	4-3
Game Highs: Points: Estrada – 20; Rebounds: Buensalida – 10; Assists: Manalili – 10
Oct 26	2:30 p.m.	Arellano Chiefs	Playtime Filoil Centre • San Juan	W 83-65	5-3
Game Highs: Points: Santos – 19; Rebounds: Omega – 12; Assists: Manalili – 11
Oct 29	11:00 a.m.	San Sebastian Stags	Playtime Filoil Centre • San Juan	L 81-82	5-4
Game Highs: Points: Manalili – 26; Rebounds: Manalili – 10; Assists: Manalili – 5
Nov 8	11:00 a.m.	JRU Heavy Bombers	Playtime Filoil Centre • San Juan	W 85-71	6-4
Game Highs: Points: Estrada – 20; Rebounds: Omega, Santos – 7 each; Assists: Manalili – 9
Nov 14	12:00 p.m.	Benilde Blazers	Playtime Filoil Centre • San Juan	L 74-80	6-5
Game Highs: Points: Manalili – 16; Rebounds: Buensalida – 8; Assists: Estrada – 8
Nov 16	2:30 p.m.	EAC Generals	Playtime Filoil Centre • San Juan	W 82-73	7-5
Game Highs: Points: Roque – 15; Rebounds: Omega – 9; Assists: Manalili – 9
Nov 23	2:30 p.m.	San Beda Red Lions	Playtime Filoil Centre • San Juan	W 87-83	8-5
Game Highs: Points: Manalili – 26; Rebounds: Omega, Santos – 6 each; Assists: Manalili – 11
3rd place in Group B with 8 wins–5 losses
Quarterfinals (Note: Arellano held a twice-to-beat advantage over Letran)
Nov 26	11:00 a.m.	Arellano Chiefs	Playtime Filoil Centre • San Juan	W 87-78	9-5
Game Highs: Points: Estrada – 22; Rebounds: Buensalida – 10; Assists: Manalili – 9
Nov 28	2:30 p.m.	Arellano Chiefs	Playtime Filoil Centre • San Juan	W 77-69	10-5
Game Highs: Points: Estrada – 19; Rebounds: Buensalida, Santos – 8 each; Assists: Manalili – 12
Letran wins series in two games
Final Four (Note: Best-of-three series)
Dec 2	11:00 a.m.	Perpetual Altas	Araneta Coliseum • Quezon City	W 77-73	11-5
Game Highs: Points: Estrada, Manalili – 15 each; Rebounds: Santos – 10; Assists: Manalili – 8
Dec 5	2:30 p.m.	Perpetual Altas	Mall of Asia Arena • Pasay	W 74-70	12-5
Game Highs: Points: Manalili – 16; Rebounds: Buensalida – 6; Assists: Manalili – 14
Letran wins series in two games
Finals
Dec 10	2:00 p.m.	San Beda Red Lions	Araneta Coliseum • Quezon City	L 70-89	12-6
Game Highs: Points: Manalili – 17; Rebounds: Santos – 10; Assists: Manalili – 5
Dec 13	2:00 p.m.	San Beda Red Lions	Araneta Coliseum • Quezon City	L 71-83	12-7
Game Highs: Points: Manalili – 15; Rebounds: Omega – 8; Assists: Manalili – 7
Letran lost series in two games

Times listed above are in UTC+08:00

Source: NCAA Season 101 Livestats

== Awards ==
Player	Award
Jonathan Manalili	NCAA Freshman of the Year
Jonathan Manalili	NCAA Rookie of the Year
Jonathan Manalili	NCAA Mythical Five member
Kevin Santos	NCAA All-Defensive Team
Kevin Santos	NCAA Mythical Five member
