= 2024 Letran Knights basketball team =

Basketball team in the Philippines

2024 Letran Knights men's basketball

Record
- Elims rank: #6
- 2024 record: 8-10
- Head coach: Allen Ricardo (1st season)
- Assistant coaches: Mike Buendia; Rey Nambatac; Kris Reyes; Yon Wallace
- Captain: Paolo Javillonar; Kobe Monje (5th & 3rd season)

The 2024 Letran Knights men's basketball team represented Colegio de San Juan de Letran in the centennial season of the National Collegiate Athletic Association in the Philippines. The men's basketball tournament for the school year 2024-25 began on September 7, 2024, and the host school for the season is Lyceum of the Philippines University.

The Knights finished the eliminations at sixth place with eight wins and ten losses, an improvement from last year's disastrous season. They missed the Final Four for the second consecutive time.

Letran big man Kevin Santos earned a spot in the All-Defensive Team honors.

== Coaching changes ==
Letran officials named former Letran Squires' mentor and alumnus Allen Ricardo as the new head coach of the Knights after previous head coach Rensy Bajar agreed to a buyout of his contract.

Joining Ricardo on the side lines are former Letran Knight and current PBA player Rey Nambatac, and Mike Buendia, who had a stint with the Knights as an assistant coach in 2013.

== Roster changes ==
The Knights lost five of its key players from previous season. Kurt Reyson graduated from college, while Kint Ariar and Kyle Tolentino decided to forego their remaining playing years. NCAA Season 99 Freshman of the Year Jay Garupil transferred to JRU, while Paolo Galvez transferred to FEU.

Transferees Jimboy Estrada and Edzel Galoy will finally play for the Knights after redshirting for a year. Estrada previously played in NAASCU for St. Clare College of Caloocan, while Galoy was a former Altas player who last played in Season 97 & 98. Meanwhile, former De La Salle Green Archer point guard Nate Montecillo will also suit up for the Knights.

Among the rookies who will suit up for the Knights are former Letran Squire Jovel Baliling, CJ Delfino, Fil-Am Jace Miller, and big man Christian Vergara.

== Discipline ==
- Letran captain Pao Javillonar was initially handed a three-game suspension after being listed in the lineup of the PBA team Converge FiberXers during the 39th Kadayawan Invitational Tournament in Davao last July. Javillonar was drafted 19th overall by the FiberXers. After Letran officials appealed his case, the NCAA Management Committee decided to reduce his suspension to two games. Javillonar missed the Knights' first two games against San Sebastian and JRU.
- Letran rookie guard Jimboy Estrada was handed a one-game suspension after he was ejected late in the fourth quarter of their game against Perpetual Altas in the second round after getting whistled for a technical foul following an unsportsmanlike behavior towards one of the game officials.

== Roster ==
Letran Knights roster
Players
Coaches

Pos.	No.	Nat.	Name	Height	Year	High School
G	91	(Philippines)	Baliling, Jovel	5'11" (1.8m)	1	Colegio de San Juan de Letran
G	29	(Philippines)	Cuajao, Vincent Petdeo D.	6'1" (1.85m)	2	Holy Child College of Davao
G	17	(Philippines)	Delfino, Charles Jacob	5'10" (1.78m)	1	St. Augustine Institute of Pampanga
F	15	(Philippines)	Dimaano, Charles Ian	6'4" (1.93m)	1	De La Salle Zobel
G	26	(Philippines)	Estrada, Johnsherick	6'0" (1.83m)	1	St. Clare College Caloocan
SG	25	(Philippines)	Galoy, Edzel II	6'2" (1.88m)	3	University of Perpetual Help System DALTA
F	8	(Philippines)	Go, Rafael S.	6'5" (1.96m)	3	Chiang Kai Shek College
PF	9	(Philippines)	Javillonar, Marc Paolo J. (C)	6'6" (1.98m)	5	Nazareth School-NU
PG	20	(Philippines)	Jumao-as, James	6'0" (1.83m)	2	University of Santo Tomas
SF	39	(Philippines)	Monje, Kobe Bryan (C)	6'3" (1.91m)	3	Colegio de San Juan de Letran
PG	7	(Philippines)	Montecillo, Nathaniel	5'9" (1.75m)	1	UP Integrated School
PF	1	(Philippines)	Nunag, Joseph Jr.	6'5" (1.96m)	2	Dela Paz Libutad High School
SF	19	(Philippines)	Pradella, James Andreus	6'2" (1.88m)	1	Nazareth School-NU
C	4	(Philippines)	Santos, Kevin Kyle	6'6" (1.98m)	3	St. Augustine Institute of Pampanga
G	24	(Philippines)	Sarza, Mark Jade	6'3" (1.91m)	1	University of the East
G	16	(Philippines)	Tagotongan, Klein	5'9" (1.75m)	1	Nazareth School-NU
C	33	(Philippines)	Vergara, Christian Danielle	6'9" (2.06m)	1	St. Augustine Institute of Pampanga
PG	2	(United States)	Miller, Jace James A.	5'9" (1.75m)	1	Faith Lutheran Middle School & High School

Head coach

- Joseph Allen Ricardo

Assistant coach(es)

- Michael Gregg Buendia
- Rey Benedict Nambatac
- Kristoffer Reyes
- Bong Solian
- Mac Villarba
- Yon Wallace
- Viane Lariosa Jr.

Strength & conditioning coach(es)

- Brian Cay

Team manager

- John Paul Beltrano

Legend

- (C) Team captain
- Injured

=== Depth chart ===
Pos.	Starting 5	Bench 1	Bench 2
C	Santos	Nunag	Go
PF	Javillonar	Dimaano	Pradella
SF	Cuajao	Monje	Galoy
SG	Estrada	Jumao-as	Baliling
PG	Montecillo	Miller	Delfino

== NCAA Season 100 games results ==
Elimination games are played in a double round-robin format. All games are aired on GTV and Heart of Asia Channel, and livestreamed via the Facebook pages and YouTube channels of NCAA Philippines and GMA Sports.

Date	Time	Opponent	Venue	Result	Record
First round of eliminations
Sep 8	12:00 p.m.	San Sebastian Stags	Filoil EcoOil Centre • San Juan	L 84-91	0-1
Game Highs: Points: Jumao-as, Monje – 16 each; Rebounds: Santos – 10; Assists: Cuajao, Estrada, Santos – 3 each
Sep 13	12:00 p.m.	JRU Heavy Bombers	Filoil EcoOil Centre • San Juan	W 70-62	1-1
Game Highs: Points: Estrada – 22; Rebounds: Estrada – 9; Assists: Miller – 5
Sep 17	11:00 a.m.	Arellano Chiefs	Filoil EcoOil Centre • San Juan	W 86-79	2-1
Game Highs: Points: Javillonar – 28; Rebounds: Estrada, Javillonar – 8 each; Assists: Miller – 3
Sep 20	2:30 p.m.	Mapúa Cardinals	Filoil EcoOil Centre • San Juan	L 62-77	2-2
Game Highs: Points: Estrada – 19; Rebounds: Estrada – 9; Assists: Estrada – 6
Sep 22	2:30 p.m.	Benilde Blazers	Filoil EcoOil Centre • San Juan	W 71-69	3-2
Game Highs: Points: Cuajao – 20; Rebounds: Estrada – 5; Assists: Montecillo – 6
Sep 25	2:30 p.m.	EAC Generals	Filoil EcoOil Centre • San Juan	W 75-73	4-2
Game Highs: Points: Santos – 17; Rebounds: Nunag – 7; Assists: Estrada – 7
Sep 28	2:30 p.m.	Perpetual Altas	Filoil EcoOil Centre • San Juan	W 82-73^{3OT}	5-2
Game Highs: Points: Cuajao – 19; Rebounds: Estrada, Santos – 15 each; Assists: Estrada – 7
Oct 1	2:30 p.m.	San Beda Red Lions	Filoil EcoOil Centre • San Juan	L 64-66	5-3
Game Highs: Points: Santos – 18; Rebounds: Nunag – 10; Assists: Estrada – 8
Oct 5	2:30 p.m.	Lyceum Pirates	Filoil EcoOil Centre • San Juan	W 78-66	6-3
Game Highs: Points: Estrada – 19; Rebounds: Santos – 11; Assists: Estrada – 7
4th place with 6 wins–3 losses after 1st round
Second round of eliminations
Oct 11	12:00 p.m.	Lyceum Pirates	Filoil EcoOil Center • San Juan	L 68-91	6-4
Game Highs: Points: Cuajao – 16; Rebounds: Santos – 10; Assists: Estrada – 4
Oct 13	12:00 p.m.	Perpetual Altas	Filoil EcoOil Center • San Juan	L 61-71	6-5
Game Highs: Points: Estrada – 14; Rebounds: Estrada, Santos – 7 each; Assists: Estrada – 10
Oct 18	2:30 p.m.	Mapúa Cardinals	Filoil EcoOil Center • San Juan	L 78-86	6-6
Game Highs: Points: Miller, Monje – 14 each; Rebounds: Santos – 6; Assists: Montecillo – 4
Oct 22	11:00 a.m.	San Sebastian Stags	Filoil EcoOil Center • San Juan	W 101-98^{2OT}	7-6
Game Highs: Points: Cuajao – 34; Rebounds: Santos – 11; Assists: Montecillo – 6
Oct 26	2:30 p.m.	JRU Heavy Bombers	Filoil EcoOil Center • San Juan	L 86-90	7-7
Game Highs: Points: Estrada – 29; Rebounds: Go – 11; Assists: Estrada – 5
Oct 30	11:00 a.m.	EAC Generals	Filoil EcoOil Center • San Juan	L 58-68	7-8
Game Highs: Points: Estrada, Nunag – 10 each; Rebounds: Estrada – 14; Assists: Estrada – 6
Nov 8	2:30 p.m.	Benilde Blazers	Filoil EcoOil Center • San Juan	L 78-83	7-9
Game Highs: Points: Javillonar – 31; Rebounds: Estrada – 8; Assists: Estrada – 11
Nov 10	2:30 p.m.	San Beda Red Lions	Filoil EcoOil Center • San Juan	W 75-71	8-9
Game Highs: Points: Estrada – 24; Rebounds: Estrada, Javillonar – 5 each; Assists: Estrada – 9
Nov 13	11:00 a.m.	Arellano Chiefs	Filoil EcoOil Center • San Juan	L 65-67	8-10
Game Highs: Points: Monje – 24; Rebounds: Javillonar – 8; Assists: Cuajao, Estrada – 4 each
6th place after the 2nd round (2 wins–7 losses in the 2nd round)

Times listed above are in UTC+08:00

Source: Pong Ducanes, Imperium Technology, Inc.

== Awards ==
Player	Award
Kevin Santos	NCAA All-Defensive Team
