= Yuri Escueta =

Filipino basketball coach

San Beda Red Lions
- Position: Head coach
- League: NCAA Philippines

Personal information
- Born: February 16, 1985 (age 41)

Career information
- High school: San Beda (Manila)
- College: Ateneo
- Coaching career: 2016–present

Career history

Coaching
- 2016–2023: Ateneo (assistant)
- 2019–present: TNT Tropang 5G (assistant)
- 2022–present: San Beda

Career highlights
- As head coach: 2× NCAA champion (2023, 2025); As assistant coach: 4× UAAP champion (2017, 2018, 2019, 2022); 4× PBA champion (2021 Philippine, 2023 Governors', 2024 Governors', 2024–25 Commissioner's); As player: UAAP champion (2008)

Roel Aurelio "Yuri" Escueta (born February 16, 1985) is a former collegiate basketball player who currently serves as the head coach of San Beda Red Lions.

== Playing career ==
He played on high school as a member of San Beda Red Cubs with future La Salle star JVee Casio. In college, he played on the Ateneo Blue Eagles, together with Chris Tiu and coached by Norman Black, he helped his team to a UAAP finals appearances (2006), and a championship (2008), defeating his former high school teammate Casio.

== Coaching career ==
=== Early years ===
He worked on his alma mater as an assistant coach under Tab Baldwin. He also worked as an assistant coach in TNT Tropang Giga in the Philippine Basketball Association (PBA).

=== San Beda ===
On July 27, 2022, Escueta was hired to replace Boyet Fernandez as the head coach of San Beda. On his first season, the Red Lions made it to the semifinals, where they were eliminated by the Benilde Blazers.

In 2023, he served one-game suspension against the JRU Heavy Bombers. Andre Santos coached San Beda against JRU on an interim basis. He then led the team to win the 2023 championship against Mapua Cardinals.

In 2024, he again led the Red Lions to the playoffs, where they were eliminated by Benilde.

== Career record ==
=== Collegiate ===
Season	Team	Elimination round					Playoffs				
Season	Team	GP	W	L	PCT	Finish	GP	W	L	PCT	Results
2022	SBU	18	12	6	.667	4th	1	0	1	.000	Lost in the semifinals
2023	SBU	18	12	6	.667	3rd	5	4	1	.800	Champions
2024	SBU	18	10	8	.556	3rd	1	0	1	.000	Lost in the semifinals
2025	SBU	13	9	4	.692	1st	4	3	1	.750	Champions
Totals		67	43	24	.641	—	11	7	4	.636	2 Championships

== Personal life ==
He is a cousin of retired PBA legend and coach Olsen Racela, and collegiate coach Nash Racela.
