= Letran Squires basketball =

High school basketball team in the Philippines

Letran Squires
- University: Colegio de San Juan de Letran
- Founded: 1924
- History: Letran Squires (1928–present)
- Head coach: Andrew Estrella (1st season)
- Location: Intramuros, Manila
- Nickname: Squires
- Colors: Blue and Red

NCAA Champion (15)
- 1928; 1929; 1930; 1932; 1948; 1957; 1975; 1979; 1983; 1985; 1990; 2001; 2023; 2024; 2025

The Letran Squires basketball is the high school boys' basketball program of the Colegio de San Juan de Letran. The Squires have won 15 championships since joining the National Collegiate Athletic Association (NCAA).

== History ==
=== Pre-war: Letran's first three-peat ===
After Letran joined the NCAA in 1924, they have won its first NCAA crown in 1928, then known as the midget basketball championship. Letran then retained the crown in 1929 and in 1930. It was Letran's first Grand Slam. It again won in 1932, now the regular junior basketball championship.

=== After the war ===
In 1948 season, Letran capped its 5th juniors basketball title under head coach Angel de Leon. Nine years later, in 1957 they have captured their 6th title under head coach Luis Tabuena and the team was bannered by Miguel de la Concepcion.

Letran would not win a juniors title again until 1975 which was bannered by Richard Young.

=== Double championships and subsequent titles ===
In 1979, the Squires, bannered by Terry Saldaña and mentored under head coach Larry Albano, won its 8th juniors title and at the same time Letran won its very first double championship together with their seniors' counterpart. Another double championship celebration was held when the Squires won its 9th title in 1983 under head coach Freddie Reyes and bannered by Gene Afable and Gido Babilonia.

Letran Squires 1979–80 NCAA Juniors Basketball Champions
Terry Saldaña · Jerry Palma · Carlito Mamangon · Robert Villalon · Peter Serrano · Willy Del Castillo · Samuel Sison · Jerry Gonzalez · Joselito Navales · Jojo Cuison · Enrico Cruz · Dennis Lee · Rolando Manhilot
Head coach: Larry Albano

In 1984, however, they have failed to defend their title as they have lost to Trinity College Baby Stallions. The team was bannered by Babilonia and Alfrancis Chua. In 1985, Babilonia and Chua successfully reclaimed the championship for the Squires before they transferred to UST to play college basketball for the Glowing Goldies. In 1990, under head coach Mollet Pineda, the Squires have captured another juniors title after five years. The team was bannered by Chris Cantonjos. The following year, Letran returned its juniors championship trophy after a player was found to be ineligible.

Letran Squires 1983–84 NCAA Juniors Basketball Champions
Marlon Bolabola · Elmer Bolabola · Jun Novela · Gene Afable · Mady Tabora · Glenn Lazarte · Fritz Webb · Gido Babilonia · Joseph Oba · Jojo Cuison · Eric Enad · Fernando Libed · Glenn Holgaza
Head coach: Fred Reyes

Letran Squires 1990–91 NCAA Juniors Basketball Champions
Francis Arabit · Long David · Danny Salamat · Jess Pangilinan · Raymond Novela · Chris Cantonjos · Vimbie Avila · Jeff Quiamco · Paul Guerrero · Danny Almendra · Rudolph Santos · Gian Paulo Evidente · Alvin Magpantay
Head coach: Mollet Pineda

=== 2000s: One more title and post-championship frustrations ===
The Squires once again would not win a juniors title. In 2000 season, they swept the eliminations, clinching a 14-0 sweep, only to be frustrated in two games by 2nd-seed Mapua Red Robins in the Finals.

In 2001, bannered by Jay-R Reyes and JC Intal, successfully captured the NCAA juniors championship by beating the San Beda Red Cubs in three games. Leland Ronquillo won Finals MVP honors.

Letran Squires 2001–02 NCAA Juniors Basketball Champions
Edward Anguista · Mark Balneg · Rico Carino · OJ Cua · Dax Dacanay · Argie De Rama · Rey Guevarra · JC Intal · Brian Javier · RJ Jazul · Juanito Quiamco III · Jay-R Reyes · Leland Ronquillo · Joseph Samson
Head coach: Jing Ruiz

In 2002, Squires stars Jay-R Reyes and JC Intal decided to pursue their college basketball careers in the UAAP. Reyes went to UP, while Intal joined Ateneo. The Squires managed to go back in the Finals, but they were beaten in two games by last year's runner-ups San Beda Red Cubs.

In 2003, the Squires finished at 2nd place in standings, but got eliminated by the third-seed Mapua Red Robins in the stepladder semi-finals. The team was bannered by Jeff Morial and Lucas Tagarda.

In 2004, the Squires successfully barged into the Finals. However, they were beaten by the San Beda Red Cubs in three games.

In 2005, the Squires finished 3rd place in the elimination rounds with 8 wins and 4 losses. However, a protest filed by San Beda forced them to forfeit all of their games and disqualified to compete in the Final Four after third-year point guard Lester Alvarez was found out having played in an inter-city league while the tournament is on going. The following season, they would finished winless.

=== 2020-present: COVID-19 pandemic and back to championship form ===
When the Philippines was hit by the COVID-19 pandemic in 2020, the NCAA Management Committee decided to suspend the 95th season to an indefinite halt. The following season, no contact sports, including basketball and volleyball, were held.

The juniors basketball tournament returned in February 2023. The Letran Squires finally ended their 22-year championship drought by beating LSGH in two games. Squires star Andy Gemao was awarded Finals MVP and Mythical Five, while big man George Diamante clinched Defensive Player of the Year plum and was included in the All-Defensive Team. With the win, Letran achieved a rare double championship together with the Knights since 1983. After the season, Gemao decided to leave Letran to pursue his basketball career in the United States.

In 2024, the Squires successfully defended their title by beating Perpetual in three games. Jonathan Manalili bagged the Finals MVP award, while George Diamante once again clinched another Defensive Player of the Year award and All-Defensive Team. After the tournament, head coach Allen Ricardo was named the interim coach of the Letran Knights. Two months later, Ricardo was officially named head coach of the Knights, while former PBA player and alumnus Willie Miller was tasked to mentor the Squires.

Letran Squires 2022–23 NCAA Juniors Basketball Champions
Arwin Alforque · Emmanuel Anabo · Jovel Baliling · Ian Cuajao · Nurjadden Datumalin · George Diamante · Charles Dural · Andy Gemao · Justine Hugo · Jonathan Manalili · Paolo Moreno · Jolo Navarro · Daniel Padilla · Dwayne Paguio · Jhazel Paguligan · Sebastian Reyes · Timothy Reyes · Syrex Silorio
Head coach: Allen Ricardo

Letran Squires 2023–24 NCAA Juniors Basketball Champions
Arwin Alforque · Jovel Baliling · Timothy Cruz · Jashlie De Leon · Jhuniel Dela Rama · George Diamante · Alex Gazzingan · Thirdie Golez · Justine Hugo · Jonathan Manalili · Jolo Navarro · Daniel Padilla · Dwayne Paguio · Daniel Quijada · Adrian Quiñones · Sebastian Reyes · Syrex Silorio · Ricardo Sumagang · Rex Villanueva
Head coach: Allen Ricardo

=== 2024-present: New era ===
The Squires were ready to defend their title once again. In the eliminations, the Squires clinched a playoff berth after defeating the Arellano Braves in the second round. But the Perpetual Junior Altas denied them of first seed. In the playoffs, the La Salle Green Hills Greenies forced a deciding Game 2 against the Squires. On the next game, Daniel Padilla missed a buzzer beater to deny a third consecutive Finals appearance for the Squires. After the season, Willie Miller stepped down as Squires' head coach due to a policy from Converge FiberXers of the PBA, which prohibits any member of their coaching staff from concurrently holding a head coaching position with another team. However, Letran officials retained him as team consultant. Later on, Letran hired former UE Junior Warriors mentor Andrew Estrella as the new head coach for the Squires. Letran standouts Basti Reyes and Daniel Padilla then committed to join the Mapúa Cardinals for their collegiate career, while Mythical team member Jhuniel Dela Rama committed to join the San Sebastian Stags.

In 2025, the Squires finished the eliminations with 7 wins and 6 losses to become the 2nd seed in Group B and earned the twice-beat-advantage in the quarterfinals. In the quarterfinals the Squires defeated the defending champions Perpetual Junior Altas in two games to advanced in the Final Four and face the EAC Brigadiers. The Squires needed three games to oust the Brigadiers and advanced to the Finals. In the Finals, the Squires swept the Arellano Braves to capture their 15th NCAA championship. Justin Cargo was named NCAA Finals MVP, and head coach Andrew Estrella was the Head Coach of the Year.

Letran Squires 2025–26 NCAA Juniors Basketball Champions
Kyle Barrieta · Nickson Cabañero · Justin Cargo · Isaiah Chua · Earl Dahino · Nathan Egea · Neil Garcia · Bo Gelin · Kurt Gabinete · Jhello Lumague · Harvey Macadangdang · Marvic Mesina · Mico Pascual · Travis Pascual · Rich Someros · Joshua Timbol · Daryl Valdeavilla · Alvin Villanueva
Head coach: Andrew Estrella

== Roster ==
NCAA Season 102

Letran Squires roster
No.	Pos.	Player	Height
2	PF	Someros, Richmund	—
5	G	Isidro, Leonard Victor	—
6	SG	Perdigon, Mark Justin	—
8	SG	Abellar, Mhico Ezekiel	—
10	SG	Sidhu, Rajver	—
11	PG	Pascual, Travis Gabriel	—
14	C	Braga, Eion Raymond	—
15	G	Leonor, Marki James	—
18	PF/C	Lumague, Mhale Jhello	—
20	PF/C	Salang, Sebastian Aiden	—
22	G	Barrieta, Kyle Matthew	—
27	PF	Garcia, Neil Ysach	—
28	PF	Copada, Bench Carl	—
32	PF	Aguas, Ethan Matthew	—
41	G	Luna, Lawrence Rameses	—

- Head Coach
  - Andrew Estrella
- Asst. Coaches
  - Kris Reyes
  - Karl Santos
  - JC Docto
- Strength & Conditioning Coach
  - Bryan Cay
- Physical Therapist
  - Juls Valencia
- Student Managers
  - Joaquin Mariano
  - Noah Asistio
  - Sam Baluyut
  - Leo Isidro
  - Adi Alvares
  - Asi Alvarez

== Season-by-season records ==
Champion	Runner-up	Third place

=== Pre-Final Four era ===
Year	Overall standings				Playoffs result	Coach
Year	Finish	GP	W	L	Playoffs result	Coach
1928					Won midgets tournament	
1929					Won midgets tournament	
1930	1st	7	7	0	Won midgets tournament	
1932					Four-way-tie with Ateneo, La Salle, and Institute of Accounts	
1948						Angel De Leon
1957						Luis Tabuena
1979						Larry Albano
1983						Fred Reyes
1985						
1990					Won both pennants, automatic won title	Mollet Pineda

=== Final Four era ===
Season	Eliminations					Playoffs	Awards	Head coach
Season	Finish	GP	W	L	PCT	Playoffs	Awards	Head coach
2000	1st/8	14	14	0	1.000	Lost Finals (Mapua 0-2)	Ronjay Enrile (Rookie of the Year)	Jing Ruiz
2001	1st/8	14	12	2	.857	Won semifinals (Mapua); Won Finals (San Beda 2-1)	Jay-R Reyes (Season MVP, Rookie of the Year, Defensive Player of the Year, Mythical Five); JC Intal (Mythical Five); Leland Ronquillo (Finals MVP)	Jing Ruiz
2002	2nd/8	14				Won Stepladder Round 2 (Mapua 90-78); Lost Finals (San Beda 0-2)	OJ Cua (Season MVP, Mythical Five, Most Improved Player); PJ Walsham (Rookie of the Year)	Jing Ruiz
2003	2nd/8	14	11	3	.786	Lost Stepladder Round 2 (Mapua 60-76)	Jeff Morial (Mythical Five); Marlon Bituin (Mythical Five)	Elmer Latonio
2004	2nd/8	14				Won semifinals (PCU 78-68); Lost Finals (San Beda 1-2)	Jeff Morial (Mythical Five); Marlon Bituin (Mythical Five)	Elmer Latonio
2005	8th/8	14	0	12	.000	Disqualified	Darell Green (Defensive Player of the Year, Mythical Five)	Elmer Latonio
2006	8th/8	14	0	12	.000	—	Julius Wong (Mythical Five)	Elmer Latonio
2007	2nd/6	10	7	3	.700	Won semifinals (San Beda 86-96,96-92); Lost Finals (San Sebastian 0-2)	JM Noble (Mythical Five)	Elmer Latonio
2008	2nd/7	12	9	3	.750	Won stepladder Round 2 (JRU 94-93); Lost Finals (San Sebastian 0-2)	Jarelan Tampus (Rookie of the Year, Mythical Five); Glenn Khobuntin (Mythical Five)	Elmer Latonio
2009	T-1st/10	18	17	1	.944	Won semifinals (San Sebastian 89-84); Lost Finals (San Beda 1-2)	Jarelan Tampus (Mythical Five); Glenn Khobuntin (Mythical Five)	Elmer Latonio
2010	T-4th/9	16	9	7	.563	Won 4th/5th-seed playoff (JRU 87-73); Won 4th-seed playoff (LSGH 91-85); Lost semifinals (San Beda 80-92)	Rey Nambatac (Rookie of the Year, Mythical Five)	Monch Gavieres
2011	2nd/10	18	14	4	.778	Lost stepladder Round 2 (LSGH 91-101)	Rey Nambatac (Season MVP, Mythical Five); Ivan Villanueva (Mythical Five); Aldrin Serafica (Mythical Five)	Monch Gavieres
2012	T-3rd/10	18	13	5	.722	Lost 3rd-seed playoff (LSGH 70-75); Lost semifinals (San Beda 57-61)	Bong Quinto (Season MVP, Rookie of the Year); Rey Nambatac (Mythical Five)	Monch Gavieres
2013	6th/10	18	8	10	.444	—		Junjie Ablan
2014	3rd/10	18	13	5	.722	Lost semifinals (San Beda 64-70)		Junjie Ablan
2015	6th/10	18	6	12	.333	—		Raymund Tiongco
2016	6th/10	18	7	11	.389	—		Raymund Tiongco
2017	T-3rd/10	18	11	7	.611	Lost semifinals (Malayan 80-82)		Raymond Valenzona
2018	9th/10	18	4	14	.222	—		Raymond Valenzona
2019	7th/10	18	8	10	.444	—	Shawn Umali (All-Defensive Team)	Raymond Valenzona
2020	Cancelled due to the COVID-19 pandemic							Robert Joseph Guevarra
2021	No juniors basketball tournament due to the COVID-19 pandemic							—
2023 (Note: Starting 2022-23 season, jrs basketball will be played in second semester)	1st/10	9	8	1	.889	Won semifinals (Malayan 83-78); Won Finals (LSGH 2-0)	Andy Gemao (Finals MVP, Mythical Five); George Diamante (Defensive Player of the Year, All-Defensive Team)	Allen Ricardo
2024	2nd/10	9	7	2	.778	Won semifinals (San Sebastian 91-77); Won Finals (Perpetual 2-1)	Jonathan Manalili (Finals MVP); George Diamante (Defensive Player of the Year, All-Defensive Team)	Allen Ricardo
2025	2nd/10	9	6	3	.667	Lost semifinals (LSGH 0-2); Lost third place playoff (San Beda 59-74)	Jhuniel dela Rama (Mythical Five, All-Defensive Team)	Willie Miller

=== Play-in era ===
Season	Group stage					Playoffs	Awards	Head coach
Season	Finish	GP	W	L	PCT	Playoffs	Awards	Head coach
2025 (Note: Starting 2025-26 season, juniors basketball will be played again in first semester)	2nd/5	13	7	6	.538	Won quarterfinals (Perpetual 2 games); Won semifinals (EAC-ICA 2–1); Won finals (Arellano 2-0)	Justin Cargo (Finals MVP)	Andrew Estrella
2026	3rd/5	13	7	6	.538	Lost quarterfinals (LSGH 75-93)	—	Andrew Estrella
