= Louie Gonzalez =

Filipino basketball coach

Career information
- College: Letran
- Coaching career: 1999–present

Career history

Coaching
- 1998–2001: Letran (assistant)
- 2007–2010: FEU (assistant)
- 2012–2014: GlobalPort Batang Pier (assistant)
- 2014–2015: Kia Sorento (assistant)
- 2015: Letran (assistant)
- 2016–2018: De La Salle (assistant)
- 2018: De La Salle
- 2019–2024: JRU
- 2020–2021: Muntinlupa Cagers
- 2025–2026: Ilagan Isabela Cowboys

Career highlights
- As assistant coach: 2× NCAA champion (1999, 2015); UAAP champion (2016)

Jose Luis "Louie" Gonzalez (sometimes misspelled as Louie Gonzales) is a former collegiate basketball player who last served as head coach for the Ilagan Isabela Cowboys of the Maharlika Pilipinas Basketball League (MPBL).

== Coaching career ==
=== Early career ===
Gonzalez, a Letran alumnus, son of a former La Salle Green Hills Greenies Tanny Gonzalez, worked with Binky Favis in the late 1990s. He's a part of Letran championship run at 1999.

After his stint at Letran, he coached at British School Manila and then became part of Glenn Capacio's coaching staff at FEU Tamaraws from 2007 to 2010. He joined Globalport Batang Pier, and reunited again with Capacio. When Pido Jarencio took over, Gonzalez left for Kia Sorento in 2014.

In 2015, Gonzalez, returned to Letran, with Aldin Ayo, a former player of the 1999 team, was coaching, and Capacio also joined. They won the 2015 title. The three later moved to La Salle, and also win a championship.

=== De La Salle Green Archers ===
When Ayo left for UST, he was appointed to head coach the De La Salle Green Archers with Siot Tanquingcen and Capacio as his assistants, but was fired after a lackluster performance. He was replaced by Gian Nazario.

=== JRU Heavy Bombers ===
He was hired by the JRU Heavy Bombers, replacing Vergel Meneses. He also served as a head coach to Muntinlupa Cagers. In JRU, Gonzalez coached the Heavy Bombers to a 7th place finish in NCAA Season 95 (2019), then a last placed finish with only one win in pandemic-shortened Season 97 (2022). In Season 98 (2022), Gonzalez had to deal with his player John Amores going on a punching spree against Benilde. Amores was cut from the team, but Gonzalez expected him to return on the next season. JRU finished better this season, tied for 6th with 7 wins.

In Season 99 (2023), Gonzalez was suspended for being ejected in their game against Benilde. JRU finished with 10 wins, its best finish under Gonzalez, only being eliminated on their final elimination round game. The Heavy Bombers regressed in Season 100 (2024), finishing last place with 4 wins, and saw Gonzalez being suspended anew for confronting game officials. Gonzalez and his coaching staff's contracts were bought by JRU in January 2025, ending his stint with the Heavy Bombers.

=== Ilagan Isabela Cowboys ===
On February 1, 2025, Gonzalez was appointed as the head coach for the expansion Ilagan Isabela Cowboys of the Maharlika Pilipinas Basketball League.

== Coaching record ==
=== Collegiate ===
Season	Team	Elimination round					Playoffs				
Season	Team	Finish	GP	W	L	PCT	GP	W	L	PCT	Results
2018	DLSU	5th/8	14	8	6	.571	1	0	1	.000	4th seed playoff
2019	JRU	8th/10	18	5	13	.278	—	—	—	—	Eliminated
2020	JRU	Cancelled due to COVID-19 pandemic									
2021	JRU	10th/10	9	1	8	.111	—	—	—	—	Eliminated
2022	JRU	9th/10	18	7	11	.389	—	—	—	—	Eliminated
2023	JRU	6th/10	17	9	8	.529	—	—	—	—	Eliminated
2024	JRU	10th/10	17	4	13	.235	—	—	—	—	Eliminated
DLSU totals			14	8	6	.571	1	0	1	.000	0 championships
JRU totals			61	21	40	.344	—	—	—	—	0 championships
Totals			93	34	59	.366	1	0	1	.000	0 championships
