= Clint Escamis =

Filipino basketball player

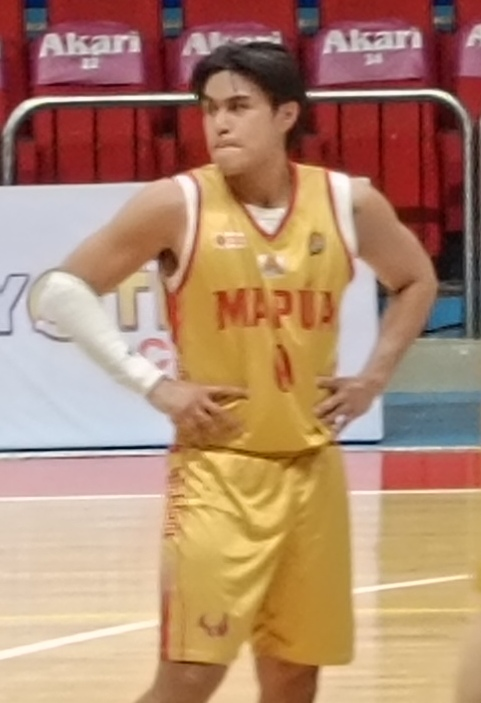
- Escamis in 2025

No. 9 – Quezon Huskers
- Position: Point guard
- League: MPBL

Personal information
- Born: October 13, 2000 (age 26)
- Listed height: 5 ft 11 in (1.80 m)

Career information
- High school: Malayan (Manila)
- College: UE (2022); Mapúa (2023–2025)

Career history
- 2024: Abra Weavers
- 2026-present: Quezon Huskers

Career highlights
- As player: NCAA men's champion (2024); NCAA men's Finals Most Valuable Player (2024); NCAA men's Mythical Five (2023, 2024); NCAA men's Most Valuable Player (2023); NCAA men's Rookie of the Year (2023); NCAA men's All Defensive Team (2023); NCAA juniors' champion (2016); NCAA juniors' Most Improved Player (2017)

Clint Escamis (born October 13, 2000) is a Filipino basketball player for the Quezon Huskers of the Maharlika Pilipinas Basketball League (MPBL).

== Career ==
=== Playing career ===
Escamis is both a juniors' and seniors' champion of the NCAA. He was a top point guard of the Mapua Red Robins before getting the coveted rookie of the year-MVP honors in 2023 as a Cardinal.

Under coach Randy Alcantara, Escamis led the Cardinals to their first NCAA championship in 33 years in Season 100. He would receive the Finals MVP and Mythical Five awards.

Escamis also played in the UE Red Warriors in the UAAP and briefly for the Abra Weavers in the Maharlika Pilipinas Basketball League (MPBL) as a Special Guest License player.

== Personal details ==
Escamis grew up admiring Kobe Bryant.
