= NCAA Season 99 basketball tournaments =

Basketball season

NCAA Season 99
- "New Heroes of the Game"
- Host school: José Rizal University
Men's Finals	G1	G2	G3	Wins
Mapúa Cardinals	68	65	66	1
San Beda Red Lions	63	71	76	2
- Duration: December 6–17, 2023
- Arena(s): SM Mall of Asia Arena (Games 1 and 2); Araneta Coliseum (Game 3)
- Finals MVP: James Payosing
- Winning coach: Yuri Escueta (1st title)
- Semifinalists: Lyceum Pirates; Benilde Blazers (bronze)
- TV network(s): GMA, GTV
Juniors' Finals	G1	G2	G3	Wins
Perpetual Junior Altas	80	91	76	1
Letran Squires	97	90	93	2
- Duration: March 16–23, 2024
- Arena(s): Filoil EcoOil Centre
- Finals MVP: Moses Manalili
- Winning coach: Allen Ricardo (2nd title)
- Semifinalists: San Sebastian Staglets; Mapúa Red Robins (bronze)
- TV network(s): GTV
Kiddies' Finals	G1	Wins
San Beda Red Cubs	71	0
Arellano Braves	75	1
- Duration: July 14, 2024
- Arena(s): Arellano University A. Mabini Gym
- Finals MVP: Laurence Pillas
- Winning coach: Anthony Urbano
- Semifinalists: Lyceum Junior Pirates; San Sebastian Staglets (bronze)

The NCAA Season 99 basketball tournaments were the basketball tournaments of the National Collegiate Athletic Association (Philippines) for its 2023–24 season. The tournament was hosted by José Rizal University. There were two tournaments, the men's tournament for male college students, and the juniors' tournament for male senior high school students.

In the men's tournament, the Mapúa Cardinals finished first in the elimination round for the first time in the Final Four era. The Cardinals then defeated last season's finalists Benilde Blazers in the semifinals. The Lyceum Pirates finished second, but lost all two semifinals games to the San Beda Red Lions. The Blazers then defeated Lyceum in the first third place playoff in NCAA history. In the finals, the Red Lions denied the Cardinals their first title since 1991 to win their 23rd title.

In the juniors' tournament, the Perpetual Junior Altas finished first in the elimination round for the first time in school history. In the semifinals, the Junior Altas defeated the Malayan Red Robins to qualify to the finals for the first time, while the defending champions Letran Squires eliminated the San Sebastian Staglets. The Red Robins then defeated San Sebastian in the third place playoff. In the finals, the Squires defeated the Junior Altas to win their second consecutive title.

In the inaugural kiddies' tournament, the Arellano Braves defeated the San Beda Red Cubs in the final; both teams ended the elimination round tied for first.

== Tournament format ==
The NCAA is expected to follow the Final Four format used since 1997.

Tonichi Pujante was reappointed basketball commissioner.

Just as in the past two seasons, men's gamedays are held five days a week, with doubleheaders on Tuesdays, Wednesdays, Fridays and Saturdays, and tripleheaders on Sundays.

A third place playoff will be held for the first time.

For the juniors' tournament, it is a single round robin, followed by the Final Four playoffs. Game are held every Wednesday, Friday and Sunday, with each gameday having all 10 teams compete.

== Teams ==
All ten schools are participating.

Men's teams
Team	College	Coach	Uniform manufacturer
Arellano Chiefs	Arellano University (AU)	(Philippines) Chico Manabat	Kalos Sportswear
Letran Knights	Colegio de San Juan de Letran (CSJL)	(Philippines) Rensy Bajar	Antbox
Benilde Blazers	De La Salle–College of Saint Benilde (CSB)	(Philippines) Charles Tiu	Anta
EAC Generals	Emilio Aguinaldo College (EAC)	(Philippines) Jerson Cabiltes	Power Hoops Pinas
JRU Heavy Bombers	José Rizal University (JRU)	(Philippines) Louie Gonzalez	Anta
Lyceum Pirates	Lyceum of the Philippines University (LPU)	(Philippines) Gilbert Malabanan	Rebel Sports
Mapúa Cardinals	Mapúa University (MU)	(Philippines) Randy Alcantara	
San Beda Red Lions	San Beda University (SBU)	(Philippines) Yuri Escueta	Anta
San Sebastian Stags	San Sebastian College – Recoletos (SSC–R)	(Philippines) John Kallos	
Perpetual Altas	University of Perpetual Help System DALTA (UPHSD)	(Philippines) Myk Saguiguit	World Balance

Juniors' teams
Team	High school	Coach
Arellano Braves	Arellano University High School (AU)	(Philippines) John Necesito
Letran Squires	Colegio de San Juan de Letran (CSJL)	(Philippines) Allen Ricardo
EAC Brigadiers	Emilio Aguinaldo College (EAC)	(Philippines) Gonzalo Catalan Jr.
JRU Light Bombers	José Rizal University (JRU)	(Philippines) Vic Lazaro
La Salle Green Hills Greenies	La Salle Green Hills (LSGH)	(Philippines) Renren Ritualo
Lyceum Junior Pirates	Lyceum of the Philippines University – Cavite (LPU–C)	(Philippines) JC Docto
Malayan Red Robins	Malayan High School of Science (MHSS)	(Philippines) Yong Garcia
San Beda Red Cubs	San Beda University – Rizal (SBU–R)	(Philippines) Miko Roldan
San Sebastian Staglets	San Sebastian College – Recoletos (SSC–R)	(Philippines) Juan Miguel Martin
Perpetual Junior Altas	University of Perpetual Help System DALTA (UPHSD)	(Philippines) Joph Cleopas

=== Coaching changes ===
Team	Outgoing coach	Manner of departure	Date	Replaced by	Date
EAC Generals	(Philippines) Oliver Bunyi	Resignation	November 22, 2022	(Philippines) Jerson Cabiltes	January 27, 2023
EAC Brigadiers	(Philippines) Azlie Guro	Fired	March 24, 2023	(Philippines) Gonzalo Catalan Jr	April 30, 2023
San Sebastian Stags	(Philippines) Edgar Macaraya	End of contract	December 30, 2022	(Philippines) John Kallos	December 30, 2022
Arellano Chiefs	(Philippines) Cholo Martin	Fired	March 30, 2023	(Philippines) Chico Manabat	March 30, 2023
Arellano Braves	(Philippines) Junjie Ablan	Fired	March 30, 2023	(Philippines) John Necesito	March 30, 2023
Letran Knights	(Philippines) Bonnie Tan	Signed by Northport Batang Pier	April 23, 2023	(Philippines) Rensy Bajar	April 24, 2023

== Venues ==
Venues in Metro Manila.

For the men's tournament, the SM Mall of Asia Arena in Pasay will host opening day, while Filoil EcoOil Centre in San Juan will host the remainder of the elimination round. The semifinals was at the SM Mall of Asia Arena, along with the first two games of the finals; Game 3 was at the Araneta Coliseum in Quezon City.

Arena	Location	Capacity
Filoil EcoOil Centre	San Juan	6,000
SM Mall of Asia Arena	Pasay	20,000
Araneta Coliseum	Quezon City	14,429

For the juniors' tournament, the Filoil EcoOil Centre hosted all elimination round, and playoff games.

For the kiddies' tournament, it was held at the Arellano University A. Mabini campus in Pasay.

== Squads ==
Each team can have up to 15 players on their roster, with an additional up to three players in the injured reserve list, and all players on each team are required to be Filipinos.

== Men's tournament ==
The men's tournament started on September 24, 2023, and ended on December 17, 2023.

=== Elimination round ===
==== Team standings ====
Pos	Team	W	L	PCT	GB	Qualification
1	Mapúa Cardinals	15	3	.833	—	Twice-to-beat in the semifinals
2	Lyceum Pirates	13	5	.722	2	Twice-to-beat in the semifinals
3	San Beda Red Lions	12	6	.667	3	Twice-to-win in the semifinals
4	Benilde Blazers	11	7	.611	4	Twice-to-win in the semifinals
5	Perpetual Altas	10	8	.556 (Note: Head-to-head differential: Perpetual +5, JRU −5)	5	
6	JRU Heavy Bombers (H)	10	8	.556	5	
7	EAC Generals	9	9	.500	6	
8	San Sebastian Stags	6	12	.333	9	
9	Letran Knights	2	16	.111 (Note: Head-to-head differential: Letran +2, Arellano −2)	13	
10	Arellano Chiefs	2	16	.111	13	

Source: GMA
(H) Hosts

==== Match-up results ====
	Round 1									Round 2								
Team ╲ Game	1	2	3	4	5	6	7	8	9	10	11	12	13	14	15	16	17	18
Arellano	San Beda school colors	SSC-R school colors	UPHD school colors	Lyceum school colors	Letran school colors	EAC school colors	CSB school colors	Mapua school colors	JRU school colors	San Beda school colors	JRU school colors	CSB school colors	UPHD school colors	EAC school colors	Letran school colors	Mapua school colors	Lyceum school colors	SSC-R school colors
Letran	JRU school colors	Lyceum school colors	EAC school colors	San Beda school colors	Arellano school colors	Mapua school colors	UPHD school colors	SSC-R school colors	CSB school colors	UPHD school colors	Mapua school colors	EAC school colors	Lyceum school colors	SSC-R school colors	JRU school colors	Arellano school colors	CSB school colors	San Beda school colors
Benilde	Lyceum school colors	JRU school colors	San Beda school colors	Mapua school colors	SSC-R school colors	UPHD school colors	Arellano school colors	EAC school colors	Letran school colors	Mapua school colors	UPHD school colors	Arellano school colors	JRU school colors	Lyceum school colors	SSC-R school colors	San Beda school colors	Letran school colors	EAC school colors
EAC	UPHD school colors	Letran school colors	JRU school colors	Mapua school colors	Lyceum school colors	Arellano school colors	SSC-R school colors	CSB school colors	San Beda school colors	SSC-R school colors	Lyceum school colors	Letran school colors	San Beda school colors	Mapua school colors	Arellano school colors	JRU school colors	UPHD school colors	CSB school colors
JRU	Letran school colors	CSB school colors	Mapua school colors	EAC school colors	UPHD school colors	SSC-R school colors	San Beda school colors	Lyceum school colors	Arellano school colors	Lyceum school colors	SSC-R school colors	Arellano school colors	UPHD school colors	CSB school colors	Letran school colors	EAC school colors	San Beda school colors	Mapua school colors
Lyceum	CSB school colors	Letran school colors	UPHD school colors	SSC-R school colors	Arellano school colors	San Beda school colors	EAC school colors	Mapua school colors	JRU school colors	JRU school colors	EAC school colors	Mapua school colors	Letran school colors	CSB school colors	UPHD school colors	SSC-R school colors	Arellano school colors	San Beda school colors
Mapúa	SSC-R school colors	San Beda school colors	JRU school colors	CSB school colors	EAC school colors	Letran school colors	Lyceum school colors	Arellano school colors	UPHD school colors	CSB school colors	Letran school colors	Lyceum school colors	SSC-R school colors	EAC school colors	San Beda school colors	UPHD school colors	Arellano school colors	JRU school colors
San Beda	Arellano school colors	Mapua school colors	CSB school colors	Letran school colors	Lyceum school colors	JRU school colors	UPHD school colors	SSC-R school colors	EAC school colors	Arellano school colors	SSC-R school colors	EAC school colors	UPHD school colors	Mapua school colors	CSB school colors	JRU school colors	Lyceum school colors	Letran school colors
San Sebastian	Mapua school colors	Arellano school colors	Lyceum school colors	CSB school colors	JRU school colors	UPHD school colors	EAC school colors	Letran school colors	San Beda school colors	EAC school colors	JRU school colors	San Beda school colors	Mapua school colors	Letran school colors	CSB school colors	Lyceum school colors	UPHD school colors	Arellano school colors
Perpetual	EAC school colors	Lyceum school colors	Arellano school colors	JRU school colors	CSB school colors	SSC-R school colors	Letran school colors	San Beda school colors	Mapua school colors	Letran school colors	CSB school colors	JRU school colors	Arellano school colors	San Beda school colors	Lyceum school colors	Mapua school colors	EAC school colors	SSC-R school colors

Source: GMA
= Win; = OT win; = Loss; = OT loss

==== Results ====
Results on top and to the right of the dashes are for first-round games; those to the bottom and left of it are second-round games.

Teams	AU	CSJL	CSB	EAC	JRU	LPU	MU	SBU	SSC–R	UPHSD
Arellano Chiefs	—	87–80	66–72	76–79	72–88	77–89*	65–79	61–85	86–111	66–85
Letran Knights	67–58	—	55–68	65–75	79–85*	69–70	71–77	63–68	86–71	59–74
Benilde Blazers	74–56	72–54	—	76–78	93–85*	81–85	71–75	77–83	87–72	86–80
EAC Generals	77–64	82–69	77–69	—	71–77	83–76*	69–73	72–86	70–86	75–67
JRU Heavy Bombers	79–74	79–74	81–84	77–64	—	88–87**	70–61	70–74	59–72	71–65
Lyceum Pirates	98–86	85–79	84–81	81–78	99–96*	—	83–87	67–62	83–72	76–73
Mapúa Cardinals	84–75	69–66	61–65	83–77	77–74	82–86	—	75–57	80–70	62–61
San Beda Red Lions	72–74	77–68	65–61	81–71	74–69	74–56	69–71	—	76–53	62–60
San Sebastian Stags	98–89	94–75	68–78	77–80	72–79	80–83	63–70	75–67	—	50–64
Perpetual Altas	81–74	73–61	73–77	86–80	72–61	81–80	53–69	61–57	75–60	—

Source: GMA
Legend: Blue = left column team win; Red = top row team win.
Matches with lighter background shading were decided after overtime.

=== Bracket ===
Semifinals (Top 2 twice-to-beat)
1	Mapúa	78
4	Benilde	67
2	Lyceum	68	72
3	San Beda	89	82

Finals (Best-of-three playoff)
1	Mapúa	68	65	66
3	San Beda	63	71	76
Third place playoff
4	Benilde	93
2	Lyceum	83

=== Semifinals ===
The top 2 teams had the twice-to-beat advantage, where the top 2 teams have to be beaten twice, while their opponents just once, to progress.

==== (1) Mapúa vs. (4) Benilde ====
The Mapúa Cardinals clinched a semifinals appearance and the twice-to-beat advantage. The Cardinals returned to the playoffs after missing out last year. The Cardinals also clinched their first #1 seed in school history. The Benilde Blazers also clinched a semifinals appearance despite losing their last elimination round game.

GTV

November 28, 2023
1:30 p.m.

Mapúa Cardinals	78–67	Benilde Blazers
Scoring by quarter: 14–18, 20–19, 22–18, 22–12
Pts: Paolo Hernandez 22; Rebs: Clint Escamis 8 Asts: Mark Cuenco 5		Pts: Miguel Oczon 17; Rebs: Miguel Corteza 8 Asts: Robi Nayve 3
Mapúa wins series in one game

SM Mall of Asia Arena, Pasay
Referees: Harry Santos (IR), Aaron Cañete (IR), Kenny Regino (NR)

==== (2) Lyceum vs. (3) San Beda ====
The Lyceum Pirates clinched a semifinals appearance. The Pirates later clinched the twice-to-beat advantage. With the Cardinals winning in their last elimination round game, the San Beda Red Lions also clinched a semifinals appearance.

GTV

November 28, 2023
3:30 p.m.

Lyceum Pirates	68–89	San Beda Red Lions
Scoring by quarter: 16–22, 22–30, 22–21, 8–16
Pts: Enoch Valdez 14; Rebs: Enoch Valdez 9 Asts: Guadana, Cunanan 3 each		Pts: Jacob Cortez 28; Rebs: Jomel Puno 9 Asts: Jacob Cortez 8

SM Mall of Asia Arena, Pasay
Referees: Joe Garcia (IR), Anthony Sulit (IR), Totie Celeste (IR)

GTV

December 1, 2023
3:00 p.m.

Lyceum Pirates	72–82	San Beda Red Lions
Scoring by quarter: 17–26, 21–15, 18–25, 16–16
Pts: Enoch Valdez 28; Rebs: John Bravo 11; Asts: Mclaude Guadaña 5		Pts: James Payosing 18; Rebs: Payosing, Puno 10 each Asts: Oliver Tagle 6
San Beda wins series in two games

Araneta Coliseum, Quezon City
Referees: Jeffrey Ablola (NR), Aaron Cañete (IR), Totie Celeste (IR)

=== Third place playoff ===
The first third place playoff in NCAA basketball history was held in 2023.

December 10, 2023
9:00 a.m.

Lyceum Pirates	83–93	Benilde Blazers
Scoring by quarter: 22–24, 19–19, 17–28, 25–22
Pts: Mclaude Guadaña 16; Rebs: Michael Versoza 13; Asts: Vince Cunanan 7		Pts: Robi Nayve 18; Rebs: Cajucom, Jarque 6 Asts: Ray Carlos 5

SM Mall of Asia Arena, Pasay
Referees: Jeffrey Ablola (NR), Kenny Regino (NR), Aaron Cañete (IR)

=== Finals ===
This is a best-of-three playoff.

The Mapúa Cardinals return to the Finals after losing to Letran in NCAA Season 97. The San Beda Red Lions qualify to the Finals for the 16th time, and for the first time since NCAA Season 95. This shall also be the first time the two teams will meet in the Finals since NCAA Season 67 (1991), where the Cardinals won on a Benny Cheng game-winner in Game 3.

GTV

December 6, 2023
2:00 p.m.

Mapúa Cardinals	68–63	San Beda Red Lions
Scoring by quarter: 17–17, 19–14, 23–17, 9–15
Pts: Clint Escamis 18; Rebs: Paolo Hernandez 12; Asts: Marc Cuenco 3		Pts: James Payosing 14; Rebs: James Payosing 12; Asts: Yukien Andrada 3

SM Mall of Asia Arena, Pasay
Referees: Joe Garcia (IR), Totie Celeste (IR), Glenn Cornelio (IR)

GMA
GTV

December 10, 2023
2:00 p.m.

Mapúa Cardinals	65–71	San Beda Red Lions
Scoring by quarter: 19–20, 11–22, 23–6, 12–23
Pts: Clint Escamis 15; Rebs: JC Recto 15; Asts: Escamis, Hernandez 4		Pts: Jacob Cortez 21; Rebs: Clifford Jopia 11; Asts: Cortez, Royo 3

SM Mall of Asia Arena, Pasay
Attendance: 22,465
Referees: Anthony Sulit (IR), Totie Celeste (IR), Harry Santos (IR)

GMA
GTV

December 17, 2023
2:00 p.m.

Mapúa Cardinals	66–76	San Beda Red Lions
Scoring by quarter: 15–24, 20–12, 22–17, 9–23
Pts: JC Recto 18; Rebs: JC Recto 14; Asts: Clint Escamis 4		Pts: Yukien Andrada 20; Rebs: James Payosing 14; Asts: Jacob Cortez 8
San Beda wins series, 2–1

Araneta Coliseum, Quezon City
Attendance: 23,077
Referees: Joe Garcia (IR), Jhay-Ar Torres (NR), Aaron Cañete (IR)

- Finals Most Valuable Player: James Payosing (San Beda Red Lions)
- Coach of the Year: Yuri Escueta (San Beda Red Lions)

=== Awards ===
NCAA Season 99 men's basketball champions
San Beda Red Lions
23rd title

The awards were handed out prior to Game 2 of the Finals at the SM Mall of Asia Arena. A new award for true college freshmen, the "Freshman of the Year" was instituted. The original Rookie of the Year award is still given to the best player playing in his first season in the NCAA, who may not always be a freshman.

- Most Valuable Player: Clint Escamis (Mapúa Cardinals)
- Rookie of the Year: Clint Escamis (Mapúa Cardinals)
- Mythical Five:
  - Clint Escamis (Mapúa Cardinals)
  - Enoch Valdez (Lyceum Pirates)
  - Jun Roque (Perpetual Altas)
  - JP Maguliano (EAC Generals)
  - Warren Bonifacio (Mapúa Cardinals)
- Defensive Player of the Year: Rommel Calahat (San Sebastian Stags)
- All-Defensive Team:
  - Rommel Calahat (San Sebastian Stags)
  - Enoch Valdez (Lyceum Pirates)
  - Clint Escamis (Mapúa Cardinals)
  - JP Maguliano (EAC Generals)
  - Lorenz Capulong (Arellano Chiefs)
- Most Improved Player: Jun Roque (Perpetual Altas)
- Freshman of the Year: Jay Garupil (Letran Knights)
- Sportsmanship Award: Arellano Chiefs

==== Players of the Week ====
The Collegiate Press Corps awards a "player of the week" on Mondays for performances on the preceding week.

Week	Player	Team
Week 1	Shawn Umali	Lyceum Pirates
Week 2	Paolo Hernandez	Mapúa Cardinals
Week 3	Clint Escamis	Mapúa Cardinals
Week 4	Jomel Puno	San Beda Red Lions
Week 5	Ry dela Rosa	JRU Heavy Bombers
Week 6	JM Bravo	Lyceum Pirates
Week 7	Cyrus Nitura	Perpetual Altas
Week 8	Yukien Andrada	San Beda Red Lions
Week 9	Jacob Cortez	San Beda Red Lions

=== Statistical leaders ===
==== Season player highs ====
Statistic	Player	Team	Average
Points per game	Clint Escamis	Mapúa Cardinals	16.28
Rebounds per game	Jomel Puno	San Beda Red Lions	8.83
Assists per game	JL delos Santos	JRU Heavy Bombers	6.28
Steals per game	Clint Escamis	Mapúa Cardinals	3.78
Blocks per game	Shawn Umali	Lyceum Pirates	1.59
Field goal percentage	Jopet Soriano	Mapúa Cardinals	63.33%
Three-point field goal percentage	Marc Cuenco	Mapúa Cardinals	38.64%
Free throw percentage	Miguel Oczon	Benilde Blazers	87.23%
Turnovers per game	JL delos Santos	JRU Heavy Bombers	3.67

==== Game player highs ====
Statistic	Player	Team	Total	Opponent
Points	Agem Miranda	JRU Heavy Bombers	31 (Note: Game went into overtime)	Benilde Blazers
Points	Miguel Oczon	Benilde Blazers	29	San Sebastian Stags
Rebounds	Clifford Jopia	San Beda Red Lions	18	Arellano Chiefs
Assists	JL delos Santos	JRU Heavy Bombers	12	Mapúa Cardinals
Steals	Clint Escamis	Mapúa Cardinals	8	Letran Knights
Blocks	James Una	San Sebastian Stags	5	Benilde Blazers
Turnovers	Nicko Fajardo	Letran Knights	8	San Sebastian Stags

==== Season team highs ====
Statistic	Team	Average
Points per game	Lyceum Pirates	81.56
Rebounds per game	Perpetual Altas	49.06
Assists per game	Lyceum Pirates	20.11
Steals per game	Mapúa Cardinals	10.56
Blocks per game	Benilde Blazers	4.94
Field goal percentage	Lyceum Pirates	40.52%
Three-point field goal percentage	San Beda Red Lions	31.51%
Free throw percentage	Letran Knights	70.44%
Turnovers per game	Mapúa Cardinals	13.28

==== Game team highs ====
Statistic	Team	Total	Opponent
Points	San Sebastian Stags	111	Arellano Chiefs
Rebounds	Arellano Chiefs	63	Lyceum Pirates
Rebounds	Perpetual Altas	63	Arellano Chiefs
Assists	Lyceum Pirates	29	JRU Heavy Bombers
Assists	Perpetual Altas	29	Arellano Chiefs
Steals	Lyceum Pirates	18	Arellano Chiefs
Steals	Perpetual Altas	17	Letran Knights
Blocks	Benilde Blazers	9	Letran Knights
Blocks	Mapúa Cardinals	9	EAC Generals
Field goal percentage	Lyceum Pirates	54.0%	JRU Heavy Bombers
Field goal percentage	JRU Heavy Bombers	53.0%	Arellano Chiefs
Three-point field goal percentage	Letran Knights	57.0%	San Sebastian Stags
Free throw percentage	Mapúa Cardinals	93%	EAC Generals
Free throw percentage	Benilde Blazers	93%	San Sebastian Stags
Turnovers	Letran Knights	39	Perpetual Altas

=== Discipline ===
The following were suspended throughout the course of the season:

- Will Gozum of the Benilde Blazers for being ejected against the Letran Knights in Game 3 of the Season 98 finals. Served one-game suspension on their first game of Season 99 against the Lyceum Pirates.
- Jielo Razon of the Perpetual Altas for being called for an unsportsmanlike foul against the San Sebastian Stags on their last game of Season 98. Served one-game suspension on their first game of Season 99 against the EAC Generals.
- Three referees of the first round game between JRU and Benilde were suspended for two weeks due to "failure to execute sound judgement, inefficient use of the Instant Replay System review, as well as for ceasing to assert themselves as game officials". JL delos Santos was supposed to be suspended due to an unsportsmanlike foul on this game, but commissioner Tonichi Pujante reversed the unsportsmanlike foul (and the suspension that goes with it) against the former as his elbow "did not connect" with Benilde's Mark Sangco.
- Shawn Umali of the Lyceum Pirates for being ejected against the San Beda Red Lions. Served one game suspension against the EAC Generals.
- Coach Yuri Escueta of the San Beda Red Lions for being ejected against the Lyceum Pirates. Served one game suspension against the JRU Heavy Bombers. Andre Santos coached San Beda against JRU on an interim basis.
- Coach Louie Gonzalez of the JRU Heavy Bombers for being ejected against the Benilde Blazers. Served one game suspension against the Letran Knights. Alex Callueng coached JRU against Letran on an interim basis.

== Juniors' tournament ==
The juniors' tournament started on February 10, 2024 and ended on March 23, 2024.

=== Elimination round ===
==== Team standings ====
Pos	Team	W	L	PCT	GB	Qualification
1	Perpetual Junior Altas	8	1	.889	—	Twice-to-beat in the semifinals
2	Letran Squires	7	2	.778	1	Twice-to-beat in the semifinals
3	San Sebastian Staglets	6	3	.667 (Note: Head-to-head differential: San Sebastian +6, Malayan −6)	2	Twice-to-win in the semifinals
4	Mapúa Red Robins	6	3	.667	2	Twice-to-win in the semifinals
5	San Beda Red Cubs	5	4	.556	3	
6	EAC–ICA Brigadiers	4	5	.444	4	
7	La Salle Green Hills Greenies	3	6	.333 (Note: Head-to-head differential: JRU +5, LSGH −5)	5	
8	JRU Light Bombers (H)	3	6	.333	5	
9	Lyceum Junior Pirates	2	7	.222	6	
10	Arellano Braves	1	8	.111	7	

Source: GMA
(H) Hosts

==== Match-up results ====
Team ╲ Game	1	2	3	4	5	6	7	8	9
Arellano	Mapua school colors	JRU school colors	San Beda school colors	CSB school colors	UPHD school colors	SSC-R school colors	Letran school colors	EAC school colors	Lyceum school colors
Letran	JRU school colors	San Beda school colors	SSC-R school colors	Lyceum school colors	Mapua school colors	EAC school colors	Arellano school colors	UPHD school colors	CSB school colors
EAC–ICA	CSB school colors	UPHD school colors	Mapua school colors	SSC-R school colors	Lyceum school colors	Letran school colors	San Beda school colors	Arellano school colors	JRU school colors
JRU	Letran school colors	Arellano school colors	Lyceum school colors	Mapua school colors	SSC-R school colors	CSB school colors	UPHD school colors	San Beda school colors	EAC school colors
LSGH	EAC school colors	Mapua school colors	UPHD school colors	Arellano school colors	San Beda school colors	JRU school colors	SSC-R school colors	Lyceum school colors	Letran school colors
Lyceum–Cavite	UPHD school colors	SSC-R school colors	JRU school colors	Letran school colors	EAC school colors	San Beda school colors	Mapua school colors	CSB school colors	Arellano school colors
Malayan	Arellano school colors	CSB school colors	EAC school colors	JRU school colors	Letran school colors	UPHD school colors	Lyceum school colors	SSC-R school colors	San Beda school colors
San Beda–Rizal	SSC-R school colors	Letran school colors	Arellano school colors	UPHD school colors	CSB school colors	Lyceum school colors	EAC school colors	JRU school colors	Mapua school colors
San Sebastian	San Beda school colors	Lyceum school colors	Letran school colors	EAC school colors	JRU school colors	Arellano school colors	CSB school colors	Mapua school colors	UPHD school colors
Perpetual	Lyceum school colors	EAC school colors	CSB school colors	San Beda school colors	Arellano school colors	Mapua school colors	JRU school colors	Letran school colors	SSC-R school colors

Source: GMA
= Win; = OT win; = Loss; = OT loss

==== Results ====
Teams	AU	CSJL	EAC–ICA	JRU	LSGH	LPU–C	MHSS	SBU–R	SSC–R	UPHSD
Arellano Braves		85–106	87–92	94–86	81–85	85–88	79–82	77–85	100–102*	79–100
Letran Squires	—		83–69	102–64	100–63	88–79	86–69	72–88	78–66	88–94
EAC–ICA Brigadiers	—	—		63–47	78–75	77–63	52–83	44–51	64–73	85–93
JRU Light Bombers	—	—	—		70–75	85–79	57–72	82–79	68–62	84–102
La Salle Green Hills Greenies	—	—	—	—		85–84	73–89	62–64	67–76	91–110
Lyceum Junior Pirates	—	—	—	—	—		52–67	77–68	62–101	75–89
Malayan Red Robins	—	—	—	—	—	—		66–75	84–90*	72–71
San Beda Red Cubs	—	—	—	—	—	—	—		79–83	56–78
San Sebastian Staglets	—	—	—	—	—	—	—	—		80–111
Perpetual Junior Altas	—	—	—	—	—	—	—	—	—	

Source: GMA
Legend: Blue = left column team win; Red = top row team win.
Matches with lighter background shading were decided after overtime.

=== Bracket ===
Semifinals (Top 2 twice-to-beat)
1	Perpetual	96
4	Malayan	91
2	Letran	91
3	San Sebastian	77

Finals (Best-of-three playoff)
1	Perpetual	80	91	76
2	Letran	97	90	93
Third place playoff
4	Malayan	64
3	San Sebastian	62

=== Semifinals ===
The top two seeds will have the twice-to-beat advantage against the lower-seeded teams, where the higher-seeded teams have to be beaten twice, while their opponents just once, to be eliminated.

The Perpetual Junior Altas clinched their first semifinal appearance since 2010. Letran, Mapua and San Sebastian rounded up the semifinalists.

==== (1) Perpetual vs. (4) Malayan ====
Perpetual clinched the top seed on their final elimination round game against San Sebastian. After losing against also-ran San Beda, Malayan settled for the #4 seed.

March 10, 2024
12:00 p.m.

Perpetual Junior Altas	96–91	Mapúa Red Robins
Scoring by quarter: 26–19, 20–26, 21–21, 29–25
Pts: Jhames Daep, Jan Roluna 22; Rebs: Jan Roluna 11; Asts: Acido, Borja 5		Pts: Sean Salvador 26; Rebs: Carl Rodriguez 12; Asts: Sean Salvador 8
Perpetual wins series in one game

Filoil EcoOil Centre, San Juan
Referees: Totie Celeste (IR), Joe Garcia (IR), Armin Gomez (NR)

==== (2) Letran vs. (3) San Sebastian ====
Letran clinched the #2 seed by winning their final elimination game against LSGH in a finals rematch from last season. They shall face San Sebastian, which had lost against Perpetual earlier in the day and settled for the #3 seed. This semifinal is the latest juniors' playoff meeting of the San Sebastian–Letran rivalry.

March 10, 2024
2:30 p.m.

Letran Squires	91–77	San Sebastian Staglets
Scoring by quarter: 25–20, 17–18, 27–19, 22–20
Pts: Moses Manalili 19; Rebs: George Diamante 12; Asts: Moses Manalili 10		Pts: Danag, Penaverde 19; Rebs: Ben Jimenez 8 Asts: Danag, Peneverde, Poracadas 3
Letran wins series in one game

Filoil EcoOil Centre, San Juan
Referees: Harry Santos (IR), Francis Bello (NR), Ralph Moreto (IR)

=== Third place playoff ===
The third place playoff is between semifinal losers.

March 20, 2024
10:00 a.m.

San Sebastian Staglets	62–64	Mapúa Red Robins
Scoring by quarter: 20–16, 20–15, 11–8, 11–25
Pts: Ruvic Danag 17; Rebs: Ben Jimenez 13; Asts: Rion Porcadas 4		Pts: Sean Salvador 21; Rebs: Mangubat, Bagro 6 Asts: Palis, Duque 4

Filoil EcoOil Centre, San Juan
Referees: Harry Santos (IR), Jemar Talledo (NR), Kenny Regino (NR)

=== Finals ===
The Finals was a best-of-three playoff between semifinal winners.

The Letran Squires qualified to their second consecutive finals, while the Perpetual Junior Altas qualified to their first finals since joining the NCAA in 1984.

GTV

March 16, 2024
9:30 a.m.

Perpetual Junior Altas	80–97	Letran Squires
Scoring by quarter: 20–29, 26–16, 15–32, 19–20
Pts: Jan Pagulayan 17; Rebs: Jhames Daep 7 Asts: Pagulayan, Acido 4		Pts: Moses Manalili 35; Rebs: George Diamante 16; Asts: Moses Manalili 9

Filoil EcoOil Centre, San Juan
Referees: Joe Garcia (IR), Ralph Moreto (IR), Jhay-Ar Torres (NR)

GTV

March 20, 2024
2:30 p.m.

Perpetual Junior Altas	91–90	Letran Squires
Scoring by quarter: 28–34, 22–25, 23–16, 18–15
Pts: Jan Pagulayan 23; Rebs: Jan Pagulayan 10; Asts: Wayne Valencia 6		Pts: June Silorio 20; Rebs: George Diamante 15; Asts: Moses Manalili 7

Filoil EcoOil Centre, San Juan
Referees: Joe Garcia (IR), Aaron Cañete (IR), Ralph Moreto (IR)

GTV

March 23, 2024
9:30 a.m.

Perpetual Junior Altas	76–93	Letran Squires
Scoring by quarter: 18–24, 20–25, 20–20, 18–24
Pts: Callangan, Pagulayan, Acido 16; Rebs: Amiel Acido 9 Asts: Icee Callangan 4		Pts: June Silorio 27; Rebs: George Diamante 11; Asts: George Diamante 8
Letran wins series, 2–1

Filoil EcoOil Centre, San Juan
Referees: Dominique Pomar (IR), Ralph Moreto (IR), Herbert Santos (NR)

- Finals Most Valuable Player: Moses Manalili (Letran Squires)
- Coach of the Year: Allen Ricardo (Letran Squires)

=== Awards ===
NCAA Season 99 juniors' basketball champions
Letran Squires
14th title, second consecutive title

The awards were handed out prior to Game 2 of the Finals at the Filoil EcoOil Centre, San Juan.

- Most Valuable Player: Amiel Acido (Perpetual Junior Altas)
- Rookie of the Year: Mark Gojo Cruz (Perpetual Junior Altas)
- Mythical Five:
  - EJ Castillo (EAC–ICA Brigadiers)
  - Mark Gojo Cruz (Perpetual Junior Altas)
  - George Diamante (Letran Squires)
  - Jhames Daep (Perpetual Junior Altas)
  - Amiel Acido (Perpetual Junior Altas)
- Defensive Player of the Year: Paul Enal (JRU Light Bombers)
- All-Defensive Team:
  - Jhames Daep (Perpetual Junior Altas)
  - Amiel Acido (Perpetual Junior Altas)
  - George Diamante (Letran Squires)
  - Martin Pineda (JRU Light Bombers)
  - Paul Enal (JRU Light Bombers)
- Most Improved Player: EJ Castillo (EAC–ICA Brigadiers)
- Sportsmanship Award: Lyceum Junior Pirates

=== Statistical leaders ===
These are for after the elimination round.

==== Season player highs ====
Statistic	Player	Team	Average
Points per game	EJ Castillo	EAC–ICA Brigadiers	22.67
Rebounds per game	Martin Pineda	JRU Light Bombers	11.89
Assists per game	Carl Yu	Arellano Braves	7.0
Steals per game	Jhun Penaverde	San Sebastian Staglets	2.56
Blocks per game	Kelly Coronel	EAC–ICA Brigadiers	1.56
Field goal percentage	Jasper Matienzo	Lyceum Junior Pirates	63.16%
Three-point field goal percentage	Rex Villanueva	Letran Squires	50.0%
Free throw percentage	Lee Marin	JRU Light Bombers	88.24%
Turnovers per game	Guillian Quines	La Salle Green Hills Greenies	4.33

==== Game player highs ====
Statistic	Player	Team	Total	Opponent
Points	Ruvic Danag	San Sebastian Staglets	34 (Note: Game went into overtime)	Arellano Braves
Points	Drei Lorenzo	San Beda Red Cubs	33	Mapúa Red Robins
Points	Amiel Acido	Perpetual Junior Altas	33	La Salle Green Hills Greenies
Rebounds	Jolo Navarro	Letran Squires	22	Arellano Braves
Assists	Carl Yu	Arellano Braves	12	EAC–ICA Brigadiers
Steals	Seann Franco	Arellano Braves	6	Lyceum Junior Pirates
Steals	Jhun Penaverde	San Sebastian Staglets	6	Perpetual Junior Altas
Blocks	Kelly Coronel	EAC–ICA Brigadiers	4	San Beda Red Cubs
Blocks	Ranniel Sayaman	Lyceum Junior Pirates	4	San Beda Red Cubs
Turnovers	Guillian Quines	La Salle Green Hills Greenies	9	Arellano Braves

==== Season team highs ====
Statistic	Team	Average
Points per game	Perpetual Junior Altas	94.22
Rebounds per game	San Beda Red Cubs	50.33
Assists per game	Perpetual Junior Altas	26.89
Steals per game	Arellano Braves	11.67
Blocks per game	Arellano Braves	4.67
Field goal percentage	Perpetual Junior Altas	46.85%
Three-point field goal percentage	Perpetual Junior Altas	30.83%
Free throw percentage	Arellano Braves	64.45%
Turnovers per game	Mapúa Red Robins	16.33

==== Game team highs ====
Statistic	Team	Total	Opponent
Points	Perpetual Junior Altas	111	San Sebastian Staglets
Rebounds	JRU Light Bombers	73	Arellano Braves
Assists	Perpetual Junior Altas	33	La Salle Green Hills Greenies
Steals	Arellano Braves	21	Lyceum Junior Pirates
Blocks	Lyceum Junior Pirates	9	JRU Light Bombers
Blocks	Arellano Braves	9	JRU Light Bombers
Field goal percentage	Arellano Braves	50%	San Sebastian Staglets
Field goal percentage	San Sebastian Staglets	50%	Mapúa Red Robins
Field goal percentage	Letran Squires	50%	Arellano Braves
Three-point field goal percentage	La Salle Green Hills Greenies	50%	Lyceum Junior Pirates
Free throw percentage	La Salle Green Hills Greenies	94%	Letran Squires
Turnovers	Lyceum Junior Pirates	29	San Sebastian Staglets

== Kiddies' tournament ==
The Kiddies' tournament started on June 12, 2024 and ended on July 7, 2024.

=== Elimination round ===
==== Team standings ====
Pos	Team	W	L	PCT	GB	Qualification
1	San Beda Red Cubs	6	1	.857	—	Twice-to-beat in the semifinals
2	Arellano Braves	6	1	.857	—	Twice-to-beat in the semifinals
3	Lyceum Junior Pirates	5	2	.714	1	Twice-to-win in the semifinals
4	San Sebastian Staglets	4	3	.571	2	Twice-to-win in the semifinals
5	Letran Squires (H)	3	4	.429	3	
6	La Salle Green Hills Greenies	3	4	.429	3	
7	Mapúa Red Robins	1	6	.143	5	
8	JRU Light Bombers	0	7	.000	6	

(H) Hosts

==== Match-up results ====
Team ╲ Game	1	2	3	4	5	6	7
Arellano	Letran school colors	San Beda school colors	Mapua school colors	Lyceum school colors	JRU school colors	CSB school colors	SSC-R school colors
Letran	Arellano school colors	Lyceum school colors	CSB school colors	SSC-R school colors	Mapua school colors	JRU school colors	San Beda school colors
JRU	San Beda school colors	CSB school colors	SSC-R school colors	Mapua school colors	Arellano school colors	Letran school colors	Lyceum school colors
LSGH	SSC-R school colors	JRU school colors	Letran school colors	CSB school colors	Lyceum school colors	Arellano school colors	Mapua school colors
Lyceum–Cavite	Mapua school colors	Letran school colors	San Beda school colors	Arellano school colors	CSB school colors	SSC-R school colors	JRU school colors
Mapúa	Lyceum school colors	SSC-R school colors	Arellano school colors	JRU school colors	Letran school colors	San Beda school colors	CSB school colors
San Beda–Rizal	JRU school colors	Arellano school colors	Lyceum school colors	CSB school colors	SSC-R school colors	Mapua school colors	Letran school colors
San Sebastian	CSB school colors	Mapua school colors	JRU school colors	Letran school colors	San Beda school colors	Lyceum school colors	Arellano school colors

= Win; = OT win; = Loss; = OT loss

==== Results ====
Teams	AU	CSJL	JRU	LSGH	LPU–C	MHSS	SBU–R	SSC–R
Arellano Braves		97–85	94–61	87–69	102–101*	114–54	76–77	74–56
Letran Squires	—		94–72	59–82	69–78	111–76	76–72	70–97
JRU Light Bombers	—	—		27–95	51–88	73–75	27–99	48–144
La Salle Green Hills Greenies	—	—	—		77–79	129–39	66–75	76–80
Lyceum Junior Pirates	—	—	—	—		49–100	62–72	94–87
Malayan Red Robins	—	—	—	—	—		60–105	32–99
San Beda Red Cubs	—	—	—	—	—	—		69–58
San Sebastian Staglets	—	—	—	—	—	—	—	

Legend: Blue = left column team win; Red = top row team win.
Matches with lighter background shading were decided after overtime.

=== Bracket ===
Semifinals (Top 2 twice-to-beat)
1	San Beda–Rizal	61	81
4	San Sebastian	83	70
2	Arellano	83*	97
3	Lyceum–Cavite	84*	80

Finals (Single-elimination)
1	San Beda–Rizal	71
2	Arellano	75

*Overtime

=== Semifinals ===
The top two seeds have the twice-to-beat advantage.

==== (1) San Beda vs. (4) San Sebastian ====
June 28, 2024
1:00 p.m.

San Beda Red Cubs	61–83	San Sebastian Staglets

Arellano University A. Mabini Gym, Pasay

July 3, 2024
10:00 a.m.

San Beda Red Cubs	81–70	San Sebastian Staglets
San Beda wins series in two games

Arellano University A. Mabini Gym, Pasay

==== (2) Arellano vs. (3) Lyceum–Cavite ====
June 28, 2024
10:00 a.m.

Arellano Braves	83–84 (OT)	Lyceum Junior Pirates

Arellano University A. Mabini Gym, Pasay

July 3, 2024
1:00 p.m.

Arellano Braves	97–80	Lyceum Junior Pirates
Arellano wins series in two games

Arellano University A. Mabini Gym, Pasay

=== Finals ===
July 7, 2024
9:00 a.m.

San Beda Red Cubs	71–75	Arellano Braves
Arellano wins championship

Arellano University A. Mabini Gym, Pasay

- Most Valuable Player: Lawrence Pillas (Arellano Braves)
- Coach of the Year: Anthony Urbano (Arellano Braves)

== See also ==
- UAAP Season 86 basketball tournaments

Preceded by Season 98 (2022–23)	NCAA basketball seasons Season 99 (2023–24)	Succeeded by Season 100 (2024)
