= NCAA Season 100 basketball tournaments =

Basketball season

NCAA Season 100
- "Siglo Uno: Inspiring Legacies"
- Host school: Lyceum of the Philippines University
Men's Finals	G1	G2	Wins
Mapúa Cardinals	84	94	2
Benilde Blazers	73	82	0
- Duration: December 1–7, 2024
- Arena(s): Araneta Coliseum
- Finals MVP: Clint Escamis
- Winning coach: Randy Alcantara (1st title)
- Semifinalists: San Beda Red Lions; Lyceum Pirates
- TV network(s): GMA; GTV; Heart of Asia
Juniors' Finals	G1	G2	G3	Wins
Perpetual Junior Altas	100	91	101	2
La Salle Green Hills Greenies	96	95	67	1
- Duration: April 11–15, 2025
- Arena(s): Filoil EcoOil Centre
- Finals MVP: Lebron Jhames Daep
- Winning coach: Joph Cleopas (1st title)
- Semifinalists: Letran Squires; San Beda Red Cubs (bronze)
- TV network(s): GTV; Heart of Asia

The NCAA Season 100 basketball tournaments were the basketball tournaments of the National Collegiate Athletic Association (Philippines) (NCAA) for its 2024–25 season. The tournament was hosted by Lyceum of the Philippines University. Opening day of the men's tournament was held at the SM Mall of Asia Arena on September 7, 2024, while the rest of the elimination round games was held at the Filoil EcoOil Centre, then the final elimination gameday and semifinals held at the Cuneta Astrodome, then the finals at the Araneta Coliseum. The juniors' tournament started on February 24, 2025, and ended on April 15, 2025.

The Mapúa Cardinals won their first men's championship since NCAA Season 67 (1991), defeating the Benilde Blazers. Mapúa finished first at the end of the elimination round and defeated the Lyceum Pirates in the semifinals. Benilde finished second, and ousted the defending champions San Beda Red Lions in the other semifinal.

The Perpetual Junior Altas won the first juniors' championship. They defeated the La Salle Green Hills Greenies in the finals. Perpetual finished the elimination round first, with Letran, LSGH and San Beda tied for second, with the three teams ranked by tiebreakers. LSGH eliminated defending champions Letran, while Perpetual defeated San Beda. San Beda won third place, while Perpetual clinched the first basketball title for their school in the deciding game three of the finals.

== Tournament format ==
The NCAA used the Final Four format used since 1997.

The NCAA mulled in moving the seniors' tournament to the second semester, and the juniors' tournament to the first semester. Reasons for the move include struggles in adjusting its calendar as a 10-team league, and for a more "unified" college basketball season; the move would have also allowed the juniors' tournament to revert to a double round robin elimination round format.

The plans did not push through, as the league opted to have the seniors' tournament in the first semester of the academic year. Unlike in the past two seasons, while men's gamedays are held five days a week, all gamedays was scheduled to be doubleheaders, except for the final playing day of the first round of eliminations, which shall be a single game involving last year's finals participants.

The NCAA appointed Ogie Bernarte as basketball commissioner for this season. However, both Bernarte and his mother fell ill as the first round of the eliminations was ending. He was replaced by Joel Ngo starting at the second round. While both Bernarte and his mother recovered, the NCAA decided to retain Ngo to avoid another transition, and instead made Bernarte a consultant.

The third place playoff, introduced last season, was originally included in the tournament. However, due to logistical issues, the NCAA decided to cancel it for the men's tournament.

The juniors' basketball tournament continued to have a single round-robin elimination round, with all teams playing one game day, with a week having at least 3 game days

== Teams ==
All ten schools participated.

Men's teams
Team	College	Coach	Uniform manufacturer
Arellano Chiefs	Arellano University (AU)	(Philippines) Chico Manabat	
Letran Knights	Colegio de San Juan de Letran (CSJL)	(Philippines) Allen Ricardo	Anta
Benilde Blazers	De La Salle–College of Saint Benilde (CSB)	(Philippines) Charles Tiu	Anta
EAC Generals	Emilio Aguinaldo College (EAC)	(Philippines) Jerson Cabiltes	Power Hoops
JRU Heavy Bombers	José Rizal University (JRU)	(Philippines) Louie Gonzalez	Power Hoops
Lyceum Pirates	Lyceum of the Philippines University (LPU)	(Philippines) Gilbert Malabanan	
Mapúa Cardinals	Mapúa University (MU)	(Philippines) Randy Alcantara	
San Beda Red Lions	San Beda University (SBU)	(Philippines) Yuri Escueta	Anta
San Sebastian Stags	San Sebastian College – Recoletos (SSC–R)	(Philippines) Arvin Bonleon	Kalos Sportswear
Perpetual Altas	University of Perpetual Help System DALTA (UPHSD)	(Philippines) Olsen Racela	World Balance

Juniors' teams
Team	High school	Coach
Arellano Braves	Arellano University High School (AU)	(Philippines) Jun Cuevas
Letran Squires	Colegio de San Juan de Letran (CSJL)	(Philippines) Willie Miller
EAC Brigadiers	Emilio Aguinaldo College (EAC)	(Philippines) Noy Catalan
JRU Light Bombers	José Rizal University (JRU)	(Philippines) Ernani Epondulan
La Salle Green Hills Greenies	La Salle Green Hills (LSGH)	(Philippines) Renren Ritualo
Lyceum Junior Pirates	Lyceum of the Philippines University – Cavite (LPU–C)	(Philippines) Al Vergara
Malayan Red Robins	Malayan High School of Science (MHSS)	(Philippines) JR Dela Cruz
San Beda Red Cubs	San Beda University – Rizal (SBU–R)	(Philippines) Miko Roldan
San Sebastian Staglets	San Sebastian College – Recoletos (SSC–R)	(Philippines) Juan Miguel Martin
Perpetual Junior Altas	University of Perpetual Help System DALTA (UPHSD)	(Philippines) Joph Cleopas

=== Coaching changes ===
Team	Outgoing coach	Manner of departure	Date	Replaced by	Date
Perpetual Altas	(Philippines) Myk Saguiguit	Demoted to assistant coach	January 11, 2024	(Philippines) Olsen Racela	January 11, 2024
San Sebastian Stags	(Philippines) John Kallos	Fired	February 9, 2024	(Philippines) Arvin Bonleon	February 9, 2024
Letran Knights	(Philippines) Rensy Bajar	Fired	February 16, 2024	(Philippines) Allen Ricardo	May 30, 2024
Letran Squires	(Philippines) Allen Ricardo	Signed by Letran Knights	May 30, 2024	(Philippines) Willie Miller	May 30, 2024
Lyceum Junior Pirates	(Philippines) JC Docto	Replaced	June 3, 2024	(Philippines) Al Vergara	June 3, 2024
Malayan Red Robins	(Philippines) Yong Garcia	Fired	June 1, 2024	(Philippines) JR Dela Cruz	June 29, 2024
JRU Light Bombers	(Philippines) Vic Lazaro	Fired	November 13, 2024	(Philippines) Nani Epondulan	January 31, 2025

== Venues ==
Venues in Metro Manila

For the men's tournament, the SM Mall of Asia Arena in Pasay hosted opening day, while Filoil EcoOil Centre in San Juan hosted the remainder of the elimination round. The last two game days of the first round which were originally to be held at the Filoil EcoOil Centre were then made into a tripleheader held at the SM Mall of Asia Arena. The second gameday postponed by Tropical Storm Kristine (Trami), and the semifinals was held at the Cuneta Astrodome in Pasay. The finals was then held at the Araneta Coliseum in Quezon City.

For the juniors' tournament, elimination round games are split on the Emilio Aguinaldo College (EAC) Sports and Cultural Center in Manila for Sunday gamedays, and on the Filoil EcoOil Centre for gamedays on other days of the week.

Arena	Location	M	J	Capacity
Araneta Coliseum	Quezon City	check		14,429
Cuneta Astrodome	Pasay	check		12,000
EAC Sports and Cultural Center	Manila		check	
Filoil EcoOil Centre	San Juan	check	check	6,000
SM Mall of Asia Arena	Pasay	check		15,000

== Squads ==
Each team can have up to 15 players on their roster, with an additional up to three players in the injured reserve list.

The ban of foreign student-athletes first applied in Season 96 (2020) is still in effect, requiring all players to be Filipinos.

Men's rosters
Arellano	Letran	Benilde	EAC	JRU	Lyceum	Mapúa	San Beda	San Sebastian	Perpetual
Renzo Abiera	Jovel Baliling	Jesse Arciaga	Brianne Angeles	Shawn Argente	Genesis Aviles	Sherfrazkhan Abdulla	Yukien Andrada	Nikko Aguilar	John Abis
Andrei Acop	Vince Cuajao	Jhomel Ancheta	Jethro Bacud	Mart Barrera	Ato Barba	Noel Agemenyi	JC Bonzalida	Rafael Are	JP Boral
Anthony Borromeo	CJ Delfino	Joseph Cajucom	Jude Bagay	Lance Benitez	JM Bravo	Jeco Bancale	Richi Calimag	Khit Barroga	Ralph Cauguiran
Yuan Camay	Charles Dimaano	Gene Carillo	Joshua Devara	Renz Bernardo	Khen Caduyac	Yam Concepcion	RC Calimag	Franz Chuidian	Ruvic Danag
JL Capulong	Jimboy Estrada	Gab Cometa	Axel Doromal	Karl de Jesus	JD Culanay	Cyrus Cuenco	Joe Celzo	Clarence Cruz	Angelo Gelsano
Andrei de Leon	Edzel Galoy	Anton Eusebio	Dave Ednilag	Marj de Leon	Greg Cunanan	Clint Escamis	Ismael Culdora	Raymart Escobido	Mark Gojo Cruz
Joshua dela Cruz	Rafael Go	Irele Galas	King Gurtiza	Cyrus Ferrer	Ronald Colian Jr.	Aaron Fermin	Penny Estacio	Tristan Felebrico	Axlrose Javier
Joseph Espiritu	Paolo Javillonar	Zenric Jarque	Mac Chester Jacob	Darrel Garcia	Jonathan Daileg	Joaquin Garcia	Nygel Gonzales	Ralph Gabat	Axl Manuel
Xander Estacio	James Jumao-as	Allen Liwag	Gelo Loristo	Joshua Guiab	Omar Gordon	Chris Hubilla	Zane Jalbuena	Reggz Gabat	Bryan Manuel
Karl Flores	Kobe Monje	John Morales	Aldeo Lucero	Justin Lozano	Mclaude Guadaña	Andrei Igliane	Bismarck Lina	Jelo Lintol	Inigo Montemayor
Em Geromino	Jace Miller	Matthew Oli	JC Luciano	Jonathan Medina	Gyle Montaño	John Jabonete	James Payosing	James Maliwat	RIchard Movida
Joseph Hernal	Nathaniel Montecillo	Roger Onoda	Jherald Manacho	Sidney Mosqueda	Neil Moralejo	Lawrence Mangubat	Jomel Puno	Migs Pascual	Jearico Nunez
CJ Libang	Joseph Nunag	Justine Sanchez	Kyle Ochavo	Ivan Panapanaan	Lyon Pallingayan	Arjay Pantaleon	AJ Royo	Kyle Ramilo	Shawn Orgo
Drei Miller	James Pradella	Mark Sangco	Wilmar Oftana	Joseph Pangilinan	JD Panelo	JC Recto	Adrian Sollano	Christian Ricio	Christian Pagaran
T-Mc Ongotan	Kevin Santos	Edson Serrano	Harvey Pagsanjan	Patrick Ramos	Dave Paulo	Brix Reyno	Bryan Sajonia	Vince Suico	Emmanuel Pizarro
Bryan Rosalin	Mark Sarza	Ian Torres	Rico Postanes	Marvin Raymundo	Simon Peñafiel	Edward Ryan III	Menard Songcuya	Leo Velasco	Nathaniel Sevilla
Basti Valencia	Klein Tagotongan	Paul Turco	Nico Quinal	Ralph Samontanes	Michael Versoza		Joshua Tagala		Justin Thompson
Maverick Vinoya	Christian Vergara	Winston Ynot	Erlan Umpad	Vince Sarmiento	Renz Villegas		Emmanuel Tagle		

== Men's tournament ==
The men's tournament started on September 7, 2024, with the traditional host vs. defending champion opening game featuring the Lyceum Pirates and the San Beda Red Lions in the SM Mall of Asia Arena. It ended on December 7, 2024, with the Mapúa Cardinals defeating the Benilde Blazers.

=== Elimination round ===
The NCAA postponed October 23 and 25 games due to inclement weather caused by Tropical Storm Kristine (Trami).

==== Team standings ====
Pos	Team	W	L	PCT	GB	Qualification
1	Mapúa Cardinals	15	3	.833	—	Twice-to-beat in the semifinals
2	Benilde Blazers	14	4	.778	1	Twice-to-beat in the semifinals
3	San Beda Red Lions	10	8	.556 (Note: Head-to-head point differential: San Beda +14, Lyceum −14)	5	Twice-to-win in the semifinals
4	Lyceum Pirates (H)	10	8	.556	5	Twice-to-win in the semifinals
5	EAC Generals	9	9	.500	6	
6	Letran Knights	8	10	.444	7	
7	Arellano Chiefs	7	11	.389 (Note: Head-to-head point differential: Arellano +5, Perpetual −5)	8	
8	Perpetual Altas	7	11	.389	8	
9	San Sebastian Stags	6	12	.333	9	
10	JRU Heavy Bombers	4	14	.222	11	

Source: GMA
(H) Hosts

==== Match-up results ====
	Round 1									Round 2								
Team ╲ Game	1	2	3	4	5	6	7	8	9	10	11	12	13	14	15	16	17	18
Arellano	EAC school colors	UPHD school colors	Letran school colors	Lyceum school colors	SSC-R school colors	JRU school colors	San Beda school colors	Mapua school colors	CSB school colors	San Beda school colors	CSB school colors	Lyceum school colors	UPHD school colors	SSC-R school colors	JRU school colors	EAC school colors	Letran school colors	Mapua school colors
Letran	SSC-R school colors	JRU school colors	Arellano school colors	Mapua school colors	CSB school colors	EAC school colors	UPHD school colors	San Beda school colors	Lyceum school colors	Lyceum school colors	UPHD school colors	Mapua school colors	SSC-R school colors	JRU school colors	EAC school colors	CSB school colors	San Beda school colors	Arellano school colors
Benilde	Mapua school colors	San Beda school colors	EAC school colors	UPHD school colors	Letran school colors	Lyceum school colors	SSC-R school colors	Arellano school colors	JRU school colors	SSC-R school colors	Arellano school colors	JRU school colors	EAC school colors	UPHD school colors	Letran school colors	Mapua school colors	San Beda school colors	Lyceum school colors
EAC	Arellano school colors	Mapua school colors	CSB school colors	San Beda school colors	UPHD school colors	Letran school colors	Lyceum school colors	JRU school colors	SSC-R school colors	UPHD school colors	Mapua school colors	SSC-R school colors	CSB school colors	Letran school colors	San Beda school colors	Arellano school colors	Lyceum school colors	JRU school colors
JRU	UPHD school colors	Letran school colors	Lyceum school colors	SSC-R school colors	San Beda school colors	Arellano school colors	Mapua school colors	EAC school colors	CSB school colors	Mapua school colors	SSC-R school colors	CSB school colors	Letran school colors	San Beda school colors	Arellano school colors	Lyceum school colors	UPHD school colors	EAC school colors
Lyceum	San Beda school colors	SSC-R school colors	JRU school colors	Arellano school colors	Mapua school colors	CSB school colors	EAC school colors	UPHD school colors	Letran school colors	Letran school colors	San Beda school colors	Arellano school colors	UPHD school colors	Mapua school colors	SSC-R school colors	JRU school colors	EAC school colors	CSB school colors
Mapúa	CSB school colors	EAC school colors	UPHD school colors	Letran school colors	Lyceum school colors	SSC-R school colors	JRU school colors	Arellano school colors	San Beda school colors	JRU school colors	EAC school colors	Letran school colors	San Beda school colors	Lyceum school colors	UPHD school colors	CSB school colors	SSC-R school colors	Arellano school colors
San Beda	Lyceum school colors	CSB school colors	SSC-R school colors	EAC school colors	JRU school colors	Arellano school colors	Letran school colors	UPHD school colors	Mapua school colors	Arellano school colors	Lyceum school colors	UPHD school colors	Mapua school colors	JRU school colors	EAC school colors	Letran school colors	CSB school colors	SSC-R school colors
San Sebastian	Letran school colors	Lyceum school colors	San Beda school colors	JRU school colors	Arellano school colors	UPHD school colors	Mapua school colors	CSB school colors	EAC school colors	CSB school colors	JRU school colors	EAC school colors	Letran school colors	Arellano school colors	Lyceum school colors	UPHD school colors	Mapua school colors	San Beda school colors
Perpetual	JRU school colors	Arellano school colors	Mapua school colors	CSB school colors	EAC school colors	SSC-R school colors	Letran school colors	Lyceum school colors	San Beda school colors	EAC school colors	Letran school colors	San Beda school colors	Arellano school colors	Lyceum school colors	CSB school colors	Mapua school colors	SSC-R school colors	JRU school colors

Source: GMA
= Win; = OT win; = Loss; = OT loss

==== Results ====
Results on top and to the right of the dashes are for first-round games; those to the bottom and left of it are second-round games.

Teams	AU	CSJL	CSB	EAC	JRU	LPU	MU	SBU	SSC–R	UPHSD
Arellano Chiefs	—	79–86	73–71	80–87*	89–92	86–90*	71–77	72–70	87–73	67–69
Letran Knights	65–67	—	71–69	75–73	70–62	78–66	62–77	64–66	84–91	82–73***
Benilde Blazers	100–77	83–78	—	77–55	84–69	103–78	78–65	70–65*	96–94*	78–51
EAC Generals	69–59	68–58	65–69	—	63–75	90–88	66–69	68–55	97–86	67–73
JRU Heavy Bombers	77–81	90–86	65–80	66–73	—	92–97	81–88	60–77	90–74	66–82
Lyceum Pirates	86–91	91–68	82–81	74–65	82–80	—	96–81	63–79	93–95	64–62
Mapúa Cardinals	75–69	86–78	75–73	82–79	75–71	69–68	—	69–76*	91–72	71–65
San Beda Red Lions	79–65	71–75	62–70	89–59	83–70	62–64	55–58	—	85–75	63–62
San Sebastian Stags	88–75	98–101**	85–91	94–101	87–85	85–93	79–95	79–70	—	52–60
Perpetual Altas	59–66	71–61	56–61	70–78	86–82	89–83*	57–71	53–57	72–83	—

Source: GMA
Legend: Blue = left column team win; Red = top row team win.
Matches with lighter background shading were decided after overtime.

=== Bracket ===
Semifinals (Top 2 twice-to-beat)
1	Mapúa	89
4	Lyceum	79
2	Benilde	79
3	San Beda	63

Finals (Best-of-three playoff)
1	Mapúa	84	94
2	Benilde	73	82

=== Semifinals ===
The top two seeded teams after the elimination round have the twice-to-beat advantage in the semifinals, where they have to be beaten twice, while their opponents only once.

This season's semifinalists are identical with the previous season's, albeit with different seedings.

==== (1) Mapúa vs. (4) Lyceum ====
Mapúa clinched a semifinals berth with their win over Lyceum. The Cardinals then clinched the twice-to-beat advantage with their win against Perpetual. Mapúa finally clinched the #1 seed after they defeated Arellano in their last elimination round game. They will face #4 seed Lyceum, who qualified for the Final Four and clinched the #4 seed after they beat Benilde.

HOA

November 23, 2024
11:00 a.m.

Mapúa Cardinals	89–79	Lyceum Pirates
Scoring by quarter: 29–21, 26–25, 8–19, 26–14
Pts: Clint Escamis 33; Rebs: Chris Hubilla 8 Asts: Marc Cuenco 6		Pts: JM Bravo 20; Rebs: JM Bravo 10; Asts: Vincent Cunanan 4
Mapúa wins series in one game

Cuneta Astrodome, Pasay
Referees: Roldan Dionson, Tom Mendoza & Meng Gomez

==== (2) Benilde vs. (3) San Beda ====
Benilde clinched a semifinals berth with Mapúa's win over Lyceum. The Blazers then clinched the twice-to-beat advantage with their win against Letran. CSB clinched the #2 seed after Mapúa won against Arellano in their final elimination round game. They will face #3 seed San Beda, who qualified for the Final Four and clinched the #3 seed after Lyceum won over EAC.

- GTV
- HOA

November 23, 2024
2:30 p.m.

Benilde Blazers	79–63	San Beda Red Lions
Scoring by quarter: 25–14, 28–13, 17–15, 9–21
Pts: Allen Liwag 20; Rebs: Allen Liwag 8 Asts: Jhomel Ancheta 5		Pts: AJ Royo 14; Rebs: Andrada, Bonzalida 5 each Asts: Nygel Gonzales 3
Benilde wins series in one game

Cuneta Astrodome, Pasay
Referees: Arnold Raytos, Totie Celeste & Jerome Gay

=== Third place playoff ===
The third place playoff for semifinals losers was originally scheduled. It was supposed to be played between San Beda and Lyceum, but was cancelled due to logistical issues.

=== Finals ===
The finals is a best-of-three playoff between semifinal winners. This is the first finals since NCAA Season 80 (2004) where neither Letran or San Beda qualified, and the first since NCAA Season 85 (2009) where another team aside from those two shall win a title.

Mapúa clinched its second consecutive finals appearance. Meanwhile, Benilde qualified for its second finals in three years. This will be the first finals match-up between Mapúa and Benilde.

- GMA
- HOA

December 1, 2024
2:00 p.m.

Mapúa Cardinals	84–73	Benilde Blazers
Scoring by quarter: 26–20, 16–17, 15–11, 27–25
Pts: Clint Escamis 30; Rebs: Chris Hubilla 9 Asts: Escamis, Mangubat 4 each		Pts: Allen Liwag 18; Rebs: Allen Liwag 14; Asts: Ancheta, Ynot 5 each

Araneta Coliseum, Quezon City
Referees: Joenard Garcia, Jerome Gay, Tom Mendoza

- GTV
- HOA

December 7, 2024
2:30 p.m.

Mapúa Cardinals	94–82	Benilde Blazers
Scoring by quarter: 24–23, 21–14, 21–19, 28–26
Pts: Cyrus Cuenco 19; Rebs: Chris Hubilla 8 Asts: Cuenco, Escamis 4 each		Pts: Justine Sanchez 24; Rebs: Allen Liwag 10; Asts: Justine Sanchez 5
Mapúa wins series 2–0

Araneta Coliseum, Quezon City
Referees: Kenny Regino, Marlon Mendosa, Joenard Garcia

- Finals Most Valuable Player: Clint Escamis (Mapúa Cardinals)
- Coach of the Year: Randy Alcantara (Mapúa Cardinals)

The Cardinals won the championship on a 12-game winning streak, including sweeping Benilde in the finals. Mapúa won its first title since NCAA Season 67 (1991), ending a 33-year title drought.

=== Awards ===
NCAA Season 100 men's basketball champions
Mapúa Cardinals
Sixth title

The awards were given prior to game 2 of the finals, at the Araneta Coliseum.

- Most Valuable Player: Allen Liwag (Benilde Blazers)
- Rookie of the Year: Chris Hubilla (Mapúa Cardinals)
- Mythical Five:
  - Allen Liwag (Benilde Blazers)
  - Clint Escamis (Mapúa Cardinals)
  - John Barba (Lyceum Pirates)
  - Tony Ynot (Benilde Blazers)
  - Tristan Felebrico (San Sebastian Stags)
- Defensive Player of the Year: Allen Liwag (Benilde Blazers)
- All-Defensive Team:
  - Allen Liwag (Benilde Blazers)
  - Tristan Felebrico (San Sebastian Stags)
  - Kevin Santos (Letran Knights)
  - Lorenz Capulong (Arellano Chiefs)
  - Wilmar Oftana (EAC Generals)
- Most Improved Player: Lorenz Capulong (Arellano Chiefs)
- Freshman of the Year: Chris Hubilla (Mapúa Cardinals)

==== Player of the Week ====
The Collegiate Press Corps names a player of the week throughout the season.

Week	Player	Team
September 7–15	Allen Liwag	Benilde Blazers
September 17–22	Pao Javillonar	Letran Knights
September 24–29	Kevin Santos	Letran Knights
October 1–5	Jomel Puno	San Beda Red Lions
October 8–13	King Gurtiza	EAC Generals
October 15–20	Chris Hubilla	Mapúa Cardinals
October 22–30	Lawrence Mangubat	Mapúa Cardinals
November 5–10	Clint Escamis	Mapúa Cardinals
November 12–16	Ato Barba	Lyceum Pirates

=== Statistical leaders ===
==== Season player highs ====
San Sebastian's Paeng Are emerged as the scoring champion, and Benilde's Allen Liwag won the rebounding title, this season.

Statistic	Player	Team	Average
Points per game	Paeng Are	San Sebastian Stags	17.88
Rebounds per game	Allen Liwag	Benilde Blazers	11.28
Assists per game	Jimboy Estrada	Letran Knights	5.82
Steals per game	Paeng Are	San Sebastian Stags	2.53
Blocks per game	Kevin Santos	Letran Knights	2.13
Field goal percentage	Joshua Guiab	JRU Heavy Bombers	59.88%
Three-point field goal percentage	Marc Cuenco	Mapúa Cardinals	43.62%
Free throw percentage	Jimboy Estrada	Letran Knights	86.11%
Turnovers per game	Jimboy Estrada	Letran Knights	4.82

==== Game player highs ====
Statistic	Player	Team	Total	Opponent
Points	Vince Cuajao	Letran Knights	34 (Note: Game went into overtime)	San Sebastian Stags
Points	Pao Javillonar	Letran Knights	31	Benilde Blazers
Rebounds	Allen Liwag	Benilde Blazers	18	Mapúa Cardinals
Assists	Paeng Are	San Sebastian Stags	13	Lyceum Pirates
Steals	Paeng Are	San Sebastian Stags	7	Benilde Blazers
Steals	Renz Villegas	Lyceum Pirates	7	Perpetual Altas
Blocks	Kevin Santos	Letran Knights	6	EAC Generals
Turnovers	Chris Hubilla	Mapúa Cardinals	8	Letran Knights

==== Season team highs ====
Statistic	Team	Average
Points per game	San Sebastian Stags	82.78
Rebounds per game	Benilde Blazers	49.72
Assists per game	Benilde Blazers	18.56
Steals per game	Arellano Chiefs	10.0
Blocks per game	Letran Knights	4.0
Field goal percentage	Benilde Blazers	43.8%
Three-point field goal percentage	San Beda Red Lions	32.09%
Free throw percentage	Letran Knights	73.94%
Turnovers per game	San Sebastian Stags	12.56

==== Game team highs ====
Statistic	Team	Total	Opponent
Points	Benilde Blazers	103	Lyceum Pirates
Rebounds	Letran Knights	65	Perpetual Altas
Assists	Benilde Blazers	30	Lyceum Pirates
Steals	San Sebastian Stags	20	Benilde Blazers
Steals	Arellano Chiefs	16	San Sebastian Stags
Blocks	EAC Generals	11	Arellano Chiefs
Blocks	Benilde Blazers	8	Arellano Chiefs
Field goal percentage	Benilde Blazers	62.0%	Lyceum Pirates
Three-point field goal percentage	EAC Generals	48.0%	San Sebastian Stags
Free throw percentage	San Beda Red Lions	100%	Perpetual Altas
Turnovers	Benilde Blazers	31	San Sebastian Stags
Turnovers	Perpetual Altas	26	Mapúa Cardinals

=== Discipline ===
The following were disciplined throughout the course of the season:

- Pao Javillonar of the Letran Knights for playing in a ligang labas game at the Kadayawan Invitational Basketball Tournament with the Converge FIberXers; originally suspended for three games, Javillonar served a two-game suspension against the San Sebastian Stags and the JRU Heavy Bombers.
- Jhomel Ancheta of the Benilde Blazers was handed a disqualifying foul during their game against the Letran Knights after hitting the back of Pao Javillonar's head. Ancheta served a one-game suspension against the Lyceum Pirates.
- Jimboy Estrada of the Letran Knights after being ejected in their game against the Perpetual Altas; Estrada served a one-game suspension against the Mapúa Cardinals.
- Coach Louie Gonzalez of the JRU Heavy Bombers after angrily confronting officials in their second round loss against Mapúa Cardinals; Gonzalez served a one-game suspension against the San Sebastian Stags.
- John Jabonete of the Mapúa Cardinals was ejected during their game against the JRU Heavy Bombers after elbowing Karl De Jesus. Jabonete served a one-game suspension against the EAC Generals.
- Marc Igliane of the Mapúa Cardinals was ejected during their game against the EAC Generals after a dangerous contact mid-air against Jhearald Manacho. Igliane served a one-game suspension against the Letran Knights.
- Bismarck Lina of the San Beda Red Lions was ejected during their game against the Mapúa Cardinals after an unsportsmanlike foul against Cyrus Cuenco. Lina served a one-game suspension against the JRU Heavy Bombers.
- John Jabonete of the Mapúa Cardinals was ejected during game 1 of the finals against the Benilde Blazers after an unsportsmanlike foul. Jabonete served a one-game suspension against the Benilde Blazers in game 2.

=== Broadcasting ===
GMA Network is the official broadcaster of NCAA Season 100. The semifinals aired at GTV and Heart of Asia (HOA), while game 1 of the finals will be aired on GMA and HOA, while games 2, and 3, if necessary, will be aired on GTV and HOA. All games were livestreamed on GMA Sports and NCAA's social media accounts, while GMA News TV International holds international rights.

Game	Play-by-play	Analyst	Courtside reporter(s)	Network
Semifinals #1 vs. #4	Anton Roxas	Martin Antonio	Bianca Alejandre	HOA
Semifinals #2 vs. #3	Martin Javier	Prince Rivero	Aleea Fedillaga	GTV, HOA
Finals Game 1	Martin Javier	Beau Belga	Flo del Agua & Aleea Fedillaga	GMA, HOA
Finals Game 2	Anton Roxas	Martin Antonio	Glycel Galpo & Kristine San Agustin	GTV, HOA

Additional game 2 crew: Martin Javier (interviewer and awarding ceremony presenter)

== Juniors' tournament ==
The juniors' tournament started on February 24, 2025, and ended on April 15, 2025.

=== Elimination round ===
==== Team standings ====
Pos	Team	W	L	PCT	GB	Qualification
1	Perpetual Junior Altas	8	1	.889	—	Twice-to-beat in the semifinals
2	Letran Squires	6	3	.667 (Note: Head-to-head goal differential: Letran +10, LSGH +7, San Beda −17)	2	Twice-to-beat in the semifinals
3	La Salle Green Hills Greenies	6	3	.667	2	Twice-to-win in the semifinals
4	San Beda Red Cubs	6	3	.667	2	Twice-to-win in the semifinals
5	EAC–ICA Brigadiers	5	4	.556 (Note: Head-to-head goal differential: EAC +7, Malayan −7)	3	
6	Mapúa Red Robins	5	4	.556	3	
7	Arellano Braves	3	6	.333 (Note: Head-to-head goal differential: Arellano +19, San Sebastian −19)	5	
8	San Sebastian Staglets	3	6	.333	5	
9	JRU Light Bombers	2	7	.222	6	
10	Lyceum Junior Pirates (H)	1	8	.111	7	

(H) Hosts

==== Match-up results ====
Team ╲ Game	1	2	3	4	5	6	7	8	9
Arellano	JRU school colors	EAC school colors	SSC-R school colors	UPHD school colors	Mapua school colors	CSB school colors	San Beda school colors	Letran school colors	Lyceum school colors
Letran	Lyceum school colors	Mapua school colors	JRU school colors	CSB school colors	EAC school colors	San Beda school colors	SSC-R school colors	Arellano school colors	UPHD school colors
EAC	San Beda school colors	Arellano school colors	Lyceum school colors	JRU school colors	Letran school colors	SSC-R school colors	UPHD school colors	Mapua school colors	CSB school colors
JRU	Arellano school colors	Lyceum school colors	Letran school colors	EAC school colors	SSC-R school colors	UPHD school colors	Mapua school colors	CSB school colors	San Beda school colors
LSGH	SSC-R school colors	UPHD school colors	Mapua school colors	Letran school colors	San Beda school colors	Arellano school colors	Lyceum school colors	JRU school colors	EAC school colors
Lyceum–Cavite	Letran school colors	JRU school colors	EAC school colors	SSC-R school colors	UPHD school colors	Mapua school colors	CSB school colors	San Beda school colors	Arellano school colors
Malayan	UPHD school colors	Letran school colors	CSB school colors	San Beda school colors	Arellano school colors	Lyceum school colors	JRU school colors	EAC school colors	SSC-R school colors
San Beda–Rizal	EAC school colors	SSC-R school colors	UPHD school colors	Mapua school colors	CSB school colors	Letran school colors	Arellano school colors	Lyceum school colors	JRU school colors
San Sebastian	CSB school colors	San Beda school colors	Arellano school colors	Lyceum school colors	JRU school colors	EAC school colors	Letran school colors	UPHD school colors	Mapua school colors
Perpetual	Mapua school colors	CSB school colors	San Beda school colors	Arellano school colors	Lyceum school colors	CSB school colors	EAC school colors	SSC-R school colors	Letran school colors

= Win; = OT win; = Loss; = OT loss

==== Scores ====
Results on top and to the right of the dashes are for first-round games.

Teams	AU	CSJL	EAC	JRU	LSGH	LPU–C	MHSS	SBU–R	SSC–R	UPHSD
Arellano Braves		72–80	71–87	85–69	91–84	72–92	78–81	68–105	95–74	80–92
Letran Squires			73–54	67–68	86–80*	63–45	73–81*	71–64	88–84	70–85
EAC Brigadiers				57–55	81–70	93–84	78–71	75–77*	76–73	84–103
JRU Light Bombers					54–76	67–64	61–74	62–64	58–68	78–85
La Salle Green Hills Greenies						100–92	76–73	78–65	82–79	88–92
Lyceum Junior Pirates							58–76	56–68	77–83	39–71
Malayan Red Robins								71–69	74–79	80–86
San Beda Red Cubs									69–64	83–80
San Sebastian Staglets										69–104
Perpetual Junior Altas										

Legend: Blue = left column team win; Red = top row team win.
Matches with lighter background shading were decided after overtime.

=== Bracket ===
Semifinals (Top 2 twice-to-beat)
1	Perpetual	96
4	San Beda–Rizal	89
2	Letran	74	77
3	LSGH	78*	78

Finals (Best-of-three playoff)
1	Perpetual	100	91	101
3	LSGH	96	95	67
Third place playoff
4	San Beda–Rizal	74
2	Letran	59

*Overtime

=== Semifinals ===
The top two seeded teams after the elimination round have the twice-to-beat advantage in the semifinals, where they have to be beaten twice, while their opponents only once.

The Perpetual Junior Altas clinched a semifinals berth after defeating the EAC Brigadiers. The Letran Squires clinched a playoff berth after their win against the Arellano Braves. On the final elimination round gameday, San Beda and LSGH defeated EAC and JRU respectively to round up the playoffs participants. Perpetual then defeated Letran to clinch the #1 seed, while Letran settles for the #2 via tiebreakers.

==== (1) Perpetual vs. (4) San Beda ====
April 7, 2025
12:00 p.m.

Perpetual Junior Altas	96–87	San Beda Red Cubs
Scoring by quarter: 21–24, 30–16, 29–25, 16–22
Pts: Dan Rosales 19; Rebs: Lebron Jhames Daep 10; Asts: Lebron Jhames Daep 5		Pts: Francis Dollente 15; Rebs: Francis Dollente 6 Asts: Andrei Uggadan 6
Perpetual wins series in one game

Filoil EcoOil Centre, San Juan

Perpetual qualified to its second consecutive finals after defeated the San Beda Red Cubs.

==== (2) Letran vs. (3) LSGH ====
April 7, 2025
2:30 p.m.

Letran Squires	74–78 (OT)	La Salle Green Hills Greenies
Scoring by quarter: 24–16, 14–21, 24–21, 9–13, Overtime: 3–7
Pts: Daniel Padilla 30; Rebs: Justine Hugo 9 Asts: 3 players 3		Pts: Arle Podador 19; Rebs: Ram Sharma 15; Asts: Gian Gomez 4

Filoil EcoOil Centre, San Juan

April 9, 2025
2:30 p.m.

Letran Squires	77–78	La Salle Green Hills Greenies
Scoring by quarter: 22–17, 23–21, 15–22, 17–18
Pts: Daniel Padilla 20; Rebs: Justin Cargo 10; Asts: Justin Cargo 5		Pts: Guillian Quines 28; Rebs: Ram Sharma 9 Asts: James Ison 6
LSGH wins series in two games

Filoil EcoOil Centre, San Juan

The La Salle Green Hills Greenies forced a deciding game 2 against defending champions Letran. Returning from suspension, Guillian Quines scored 28 points, including the game winner, to lead LSGH back to the finals. Letran's Daniel Padilla missed a buzzer beater to deny a third consecutive Finals appearance from the defending champions.

Letran coach Willie Miller wrote to the management committee on a supposed flop made by LSGH player Arle Podador in the last 6.5 seconds of the game; the referees ruled that replays were inconclusive.

=== Third place playoff ===
HOA

April 13, 2025
12:00 p.m.

Letran Squires	59–74	San Beda Red Cubs
Scoring by quarter: 14–19, 13–22, 18–17, 14–16
Pts: 3 players 8 Rebs: Jhuniel dela Rama 8 Asts: Quiones, Silorio 2		Pts: Randaile Medroso 24; Rebs: MJ Vailoces 12; Asts: MJ Vailoces 5

Filoil EcoOil Centre, San Juan

=== Finals ===
The semifinals winners shall dispute the championship in a best-of-three finals.

HOA

April 11, 2025
2:30 p.m.

Perpetual Junior Altas	100–96	La Salle Green Hills Greenies
Scoring by quarter: 26–22, 18–23, 35–23, 21–28
Pts: Lebron Jhames Daep 21; Rebs: Icee Cailangan 12; Asts: Icee Cailangan 7		Pts: Guillian Quines 29; Rebs: Ortega, Sharma 8 Asts: Dale Ortega 4

Filoil EcoOil Centre, San Juan

- GTV
- HOA

April 13, 2025
2:30 p.m.

Perpetual Junior Altas	91–95	La Salle Green Hills Greenies
Scoring by quarter: 30–37, 24–15, 17–16, 20–26
Pts: Jan Roluna 25; Rebs: Lebron Jhames Daep 14; Asts: Icee Callangan 9		Pts: Guillian Quines 35; Rebs: Ram Sharma 16; Asts: Gomez, Ison 6

Filoil EcoOil Centre, San Juan

- GTV
- HOA

April 15, 2025
2:30 p.m.

Perpetual Junior Altas	101–67	La Salle Green Hills Greenies
Scoring by quarter: 32–18, 26–20, 23–17, 20–12
Pts: Jan Roluna 15; Rebs: Lebron Jhames Daep 12; Asts: Icee Callangan 12		Pts: Guillian Quines 18; Rebs: Ram Sharma 7 Asts: Gian Gomez 3
Perpetual wins series, 2–1

Filoil EcoOil Centre, San Juan

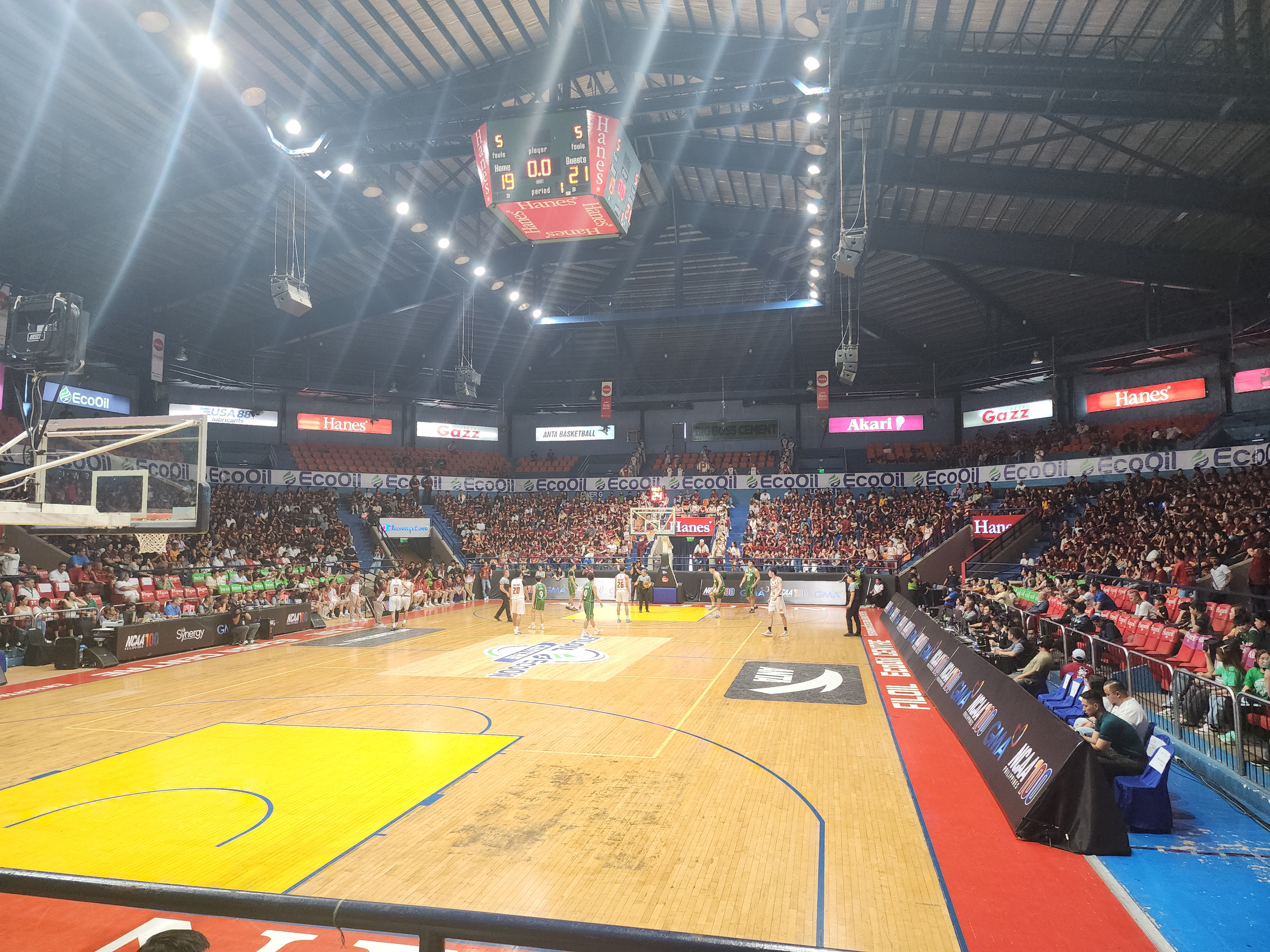
Game 1 of the Finals at the Filoil EcoOil Centre

- Finals Most Valuable Player: Lebron Jhames Daep (Perpetual Junior Altas)
- Coach of the Year: Joph Cleopas (Perpetual Junior Altas)

The Perpetual Junior Altas won their first NCAA basketball title after winning the series 2–1.

=== Awards ===
NCAA Season 100 juniors' basketball champions
Perpetual Junior Altas
First title

The awards were given prior to game 2 of the finals, at the Filoil EcoOil Centre.

- Most Valuable Player: Lebron Jhames Daep (Perpetual Junior Altas)
- Rookie of the Year: Allan Laurenaria (Mapúa Red Robins)
- Mythical Five:
  - Lebron Jhames Daep (Perpetual Junior Altas)
  - Jan Roluna (Perpetual Junior Altas)
  - Jhuniel dela Rama (Letran Squires)
  - EJ Castillo (EAC–ICA Brigadiers)
  - Sanlea Penaverde (San Sebastian Staglets)
- Defensive Player of the Year: Sean Franco (Arellano Braves)
- All-Defensive Team:
  - Sean Franco (Arellano Braves)
  - Lebron Jhames Daep (Perpetual Junior Altas)
  - Sanlea Penaverde (San Sebastian Staglets)
  - Jhuniel dela Rama (Letran Squires)
  - Allan Laurenaria (Mapúa Red Robins)
- Most Improved Player: Jericho Cristino (Perpetual Junior Altas)

=== Statistical leaders ===
==== Season player highs ====
Statistic	Player	Team	Average
Points per game	Sanlea Peñaverde	San Sebastian Staglets	24.11
Rebounds per game	Jhuniel Dela Rama	Letran Squires	9.22
Assists per game	Clint Bonus	EAC–ICA Brigadiers	5.89
Steals per game	Kit Bonus	San Sebastian Staglets	4.0
Blocks per game	Joss Poli	Lyceum Junior Pirates	2.11
Field goal percentage	Jan Roluna	Perpetual Junior Altas	57.14%
Three-point field goal percentage	Lexi Callueng	JRU Light Bombers	40.0%
Free throw percentage	EJ Castillo	EAC–ICA Brigadiers	86.96%
Turnovers per game	Kit Bonus	San Sebastian Staglets	7.0

==== Game player highs ====
Statistic	Player	Team	Total	Opponent
Points	Daniel Padilla	Letran Squires	39	San Sebastian Staglets
Rebounds	Allan Laurenaria	Mapúa Red Robins	16	JRU Light Bombers
Rebounds	Harry Herrera	San Sebastian Staglets	16	Mapúa Red Robins
Rebounds	Jhuniel Dela Rama	Letran Squires	16 (Note: Game went to overtime)	La Salle Green Hills Greenies
Assists	Neil Abequibel	JRU Light Bombers	13	Arellano Braves
Steals	Sanlea Peñaverde	San Sebastian Stags	9	Lyceum Junior Pirates
Blocks	5 players	various	4	various
Turnovers	James Almario	JRU Light Bombers	11	Arellano Braves

==== Season team highs ====
Statistic	Team	Average
Points per game	Perpetual Junior Altas	88.67
Rebounds per game	Letran Squires	51.89
Assists per game	Perpetual Junior Altas	22.33
Steals per game	La Salle Green Hills Greenies	14.0
Blocks per game	Arellano Braves	5.89
Field goal percentage	Perpetual Junior Altas	42.32%
Three-point field goal percentage	Mapúa Red Robins	29.25%
Free throw percentage	Perpetual Junior Altas	64.18%
Turnovers per game	JRU Light Bombers	15.78

==== Game team highs ====
Statistic	Team	Total	Opponent
Points	San Beda Red Cubs	105	Arellano Braves
Rebounds	Letran Squires	71	La Salle Green Hills Greenies
Rebounds	Perpetual Junior Altas	64	Lyceum Junior Pirates
Assists	Perpetual Junior Altas	33	San Sebastian Staglets
Steals	San Sebastian Staglets	22	Lyceum Junior Pirates
Blocks	Arellano Braves	10	EAC–ICA Brigadiers
Field goal percentage	JRU Light Bombers	55.0%	Perpetual Junior Altas
Three-point field goal percentage	Arellano Braves	41.0%	La Salle Green Hills Greenies
Free throw percentage	Letran Squires	100%	EAC–ICA Brigadiers
Turnovers	Letran Squires	33	La Salle Green Hills Greenies
Turnovers	Lyceum Junior Pirates	31	San Sebastian Staglets

== See also ==
- UAAP Season 87 basketball tournaments

Preceded by Season 99 (2023–24)	NCAA basketball seasons Season 100 (2024–25)	Succeeded by Season 101 (2025)
