= Allen Ricardo =

Filipino basketball coach

Letran Knights
- Position: Head coach
- League: NCAA PH

Personal information
- Born: January 30, 1986 (age 40)

Career history

Coaching
- 2008–2010: Letran (assistant)
- 2016–2017: Phoenix Fuel Masters (assistant)
- 2010–2017: La Salle Green Hills (assistant)
- 2018–2020: UST (assistant)
- 2018–2019: Bulacan Kuyas (assistant)
- 2022–2024: Letran HS
- 2024–present: Letran

Career highlights
- As head coach: 2× NCAA juniors' champion (2022–23, 2023–24); As assistant coach: NCAA juniors' champion (2017–18)

Joseph Allen Ricardo is a Filipino coach specializing in skills training who is currently serves as the head coach of Letran Knights.

== Career ==
=== Early career at Letran ===
Ricardo started as a volunteer assistant coach for Letran Knights under Louie Alas in 2008, and served until 2010. His time as Letran assistant coach started his skills coaching, and in his first year, he went by the management allowances including free meals.

=== Assistant coaching ===
Ricardo also worked for La Salle Green Hills' high school basketball team and won a juniors' championship. Later on, he also hired as an assistant coach to Ariel Vanguardia's Phoenix Fuel Masters, Bulacan Kuyas in the MPBL and for UST Growling Tigers. He served for UST before pandemic.

He also attended coaching seminar in the United States.

=== Head coach ===
In 2022, he was hired as Letran Squires head coach, and led the high school into back-to-back championships in 2022–23 and 2023–24.

After weak performance by the senior team, Ricardo was hired to be its head coach. The Letran Knights improved from 2 wins in 2023 to an 8–10 record in 2024, gave Benilde its first loss in the season, and won against San Beda for the first time in two years, but still missed the playoffs.

== Coaching record ==
=== High school ===
Season	Team	Elimination round					Playoffs				
Season	Team	Finish	GP	W	L	PCT	GP	W	L	PCT	Results
2023	CSJL	1st/10	9	8	1	.889	3	3	0	1.000	Champion
2024	CSJL	2nd/10	9	7	2	.778	4	3	1	.750	Champion
Total			18	15	3	.833	7	6	1	.857	2 championships

=== College ===
Season	Team	Elimination round					Playoffs				
Season	Team	Finish	GP	W	L	PCT	GP	W	L	PCT	Results
2024	CSJL	6th	18	8	10	.444	–	–	–	–	Eliminated
2025	CSJL	3rd	13	8	5	.615	6	4	2	.667	Finals
Total			31	16	15	.516	6	4	2	.667	0 championships
