= Mapúa Cardinals basketball =

Philippines college basketball team

Mapúa Cardinals
2026 Mapúa Cardinals basketball team
- University: Mapúa University
- Founded: 1930; 96 years ago
- History: MIT Cardinals (until 2017); MU Cardinals (since 2017)
- Head coach: Chito Victolero (1st season)
- Location: Intramuros, Manila
- Nickname: Cardinals
- Colors: Red, Yellow, and Black

NCAA Champion (6)
- 1949, 1965, 1981, 1990, 1991, 2024

The Mapúa Cardinals basketball program represents Mapúa University (MU) in men's basketball as a member of the National Collegiate Athletic Association (Philippines) (NCAA). The Mapúa Cardinals are one of the three NCAA seniors' basketball teams in Intramuros.

== History ==
Originally as the Mapúa Institute of Technology (MIT), the Cardinals are named after the Major League Baseball team St. Louis Cardinals. The Cardinals have won six NCAA titles, the first in 1949, and the latest in 2024. Atoy Co won the NCAA MVP award in 1971, and would later coach the team in the 21st century. Freddie Hubalde won the NCAA MVP award in 1973, and will be teammate of Co in the grand-slam winning 1983 Crispa Redmanizers team. Alvin Patrimonio then played for the Cardinals from 1983 to 1986, becoming NCAA MVP in his final two seasons with MIT.

In 1981, the Cardinals won their third title led by Leo Isaac who was voted MVP for the 1981 NCAA Men's Basketball Championship.

In 1990 the Cardinals coached by Joel Banal won their fourth championship, their first since 1981, beating the San Sebastian Stags. The team was led by Kevin Ramas, Benny Cheng and Randy Alcantara.

In 1991, the Cardinals won their first and only back to back titles off a go-ahead shot by Benny Cheng against the San Beda Red Lions.

=== Final Four era ===
In 2001, Mapua qualified to its first playoff appearance in the Final Four era. They took the eventual champions San Sebastian Stags to a second game before being eliminated. Two years later, they were eliminated in the semifinals against Letran. Starting in 2005, Kelvin dela Peña led the Cardinals to four straight semifinals appearances, losing to defending champions PCU in 2005 and to San Beda in the next three years. Dela Peña was named Rookie of the Year in 2005, and Most Valuable Player (MVP) in 2007.

The Cardinals would not make it to the playoffs until 2015 when Nigerian Allwell Oraeme led them to the semifinals. Named Rookie of the Year, MVP, and three other awards, he and coach Atoy Co ended two seasons of being in last place to qualify to the semifinals, where they were beaten by Letran. Oraeme had another banner year in 2016, winning the MVP award and Defensive Player of the Year. The Cardinals lost to the Arellano Chiefs in the semifinals. Preparing for the 2017 season, Co revealed that Oraeme left school, saying he was not happy at Mapua and intends to go back to Nigeria. The Cardinals finished outside the playoff places in the next two seasons, and Mapua let go Co after the 2018 campaign.

Randy Alcantara, coach of the successful Malayan Red Robins (their high school team), was then named coach of the seniors team. In the 2021 season (held in early 2022), the Cardinals qualified to its first Finals appearance since 1995. They lost to the defending champions Letran Knights. In the next season, Mapua won its first game vs. San Beda, which was then reversed due to an ineligible player. The Cardinals then lost seven consecutive games. Mapua did not qualify to the playoffs. On the next season, Mapua clinched its first #1 seed in school history, returning to the playoffs. However, the Cardinals were upset by the San Beda Red Lions in the finals.

The following year 2024, the Cardinals won their sixth championship, their first in 33 years beating the Benilde Blazers in a 2-game sweep of the finals. Clint Escamis was named the Finals MVP.

During their title defense defense, a new format was introduced and the Cardinals finished third in group A of the classification phase with a 7 - 6 record after a loss to the Chiefs in the final day of the regular season. Their season ended after losing in their do-or-die quarterfinal game to the Blazers 74-72.

== Current roster ==
NCAA Season 102

Mapúa Cardinals roster
Players
Coaches

Pos.	No.	Nat.	Name	Height	Year	High School
PF	1	(Philippines)	Igliane, Marc	6'4" (1.93m)	5th	Colegio of San Benildo-Rizal
G	3	(Philippines)	Timbol, Kyle	6'3" (1.91m)	1st	University of the East
SF	6	(Philippines)	Reyes, Sebastian	6'5" (1.96m)	3rd	Colegio de San Juan de Letran
G/F	7	(Philippines)	Nitura, Lance	6'2" (1.88m)	1st	University of Perpetual Help System DALTA
F	8	(Philippines)	Mendoza, Gian	6'3" (1.91m)	1st	Centro Escolar University
G	9	(Philippines)	Razon, Louis	5'11" (1.8m)	1st	King's Christian College
SG	10	(Philippines)	Cuenco, Marc	6'2" (1.88m)	5th	Arellano University
G	16	(Philippines)	Bernabe, Mackenzie	6'4" (1.93m)	1st	Mapua University
G	23	(Philippines)	Bo, Ken	5'9" (1.75m)	1st	Lyceum of the Philippines University
G	24	(Philippines)	Liwanag, Russel	6'0" (1.83m)	1st	-
F	25	(Philippines)	Diaz, Jamal	5'9" (1.75m)	1st	University of the East
SG	26	(Philippines)	Lazarte, Ivan	6'2" (1.88m)	2nd	Malayan High School of Science
F	34	(Philippines)	Concepcion, Yam	6'5" (1.96m)	4th	Philippine Christian University
PF	35	(Philippines)	Ryan III, Edward	6'5" (1.96m)	3rd	Philippine Christian University
G/F	86	(Philippines)	Nitura, Marcus	6'2" (1.88m)	4th	Univ. of Perpetual Help System DALTA
G	92	(Philippines)	Dones, Ken	6'1" (1.85m)	1st	-

Head coach

- (Philippines) Chito Victolero

Assistant coach(es)

- (Philippines) Raymond Tiongco
- (Philippines) Marlon Martin
- (Philippines) Jonathan Banal
- (Philippines) Erwin Victolero
- (Philippines) JR Dela Cruz
- (Philippines) Jeffrey Martin
- (Philippines) JR Carlos
- (Philippines) Marionne Josef Baleno

Legend

- (C) Team captain
- Injured

Mapúa Red Robins roster
Players
Coaches

Pos.	No.	Nat.	Name	Height	Year	High School
PF	0	(Philippines)	Pena, Yujin	6'2" (1.88m)	-	-
PG/G	3	(Philippines)	Victolero, Carlos	5'6" (1.68m)	-	-
G	4	(Philippines)	Catalan, Ron	5'10" (1.78m)	-	-
G/F	6	(Philippines)	Judilla, Zack	6'3" (1.91m)	-	-
G	10	(Philippines)	Gimony, Gerald	6'0" (1.83m)	-	-
G	12	(Philippines)	Vargas, Ardee	6'0" (1.83m)	-	-
PG	14	(Philippines)	Alanza, Jade	5'6" (1.68m)	-	-
G	23	(Philippines)	Panganiban, Kiefer	6'0" (1.83m)	-	-
F/C	24	(Philippines)	Vitug, Joshricson	6'5" (1.96m)	-	-
SG/G	26	(Philippines)	Docto III, Anacito	6'9" (2.06m)	-	-
G	27	(Philippines)	Relojo, Ray	5'7" (1.7m)	-	-
F/C	30	(Philippines)	Isidro, Franz	6'5" (1.96m)	-	-
G/F	33	(Philippines)	Orbista, Tobby	6'1" (1.85m)	-	-
G	52	(Philippines)	Ali, John	6'0" (1.83m)	-	-
G/F	77	(Philippines)	Sy, Khyle	6'2" (1.88m)	-	-
F/C	88	(Philippines)	Parame, Chris	6'5" (1.96m)	-	-

Head coach

- (Philippines) Jeffrey Martin

Assistant coach(es)

- (Philippines) Jasper Magno
- (Philippines) Karlo Pacheco
- (Philippines) Romualdo Intalan
- (Philippines) Carlo Pancho Alfonso
- (Philippines) Angelo Tenorio
- (Philippines) Jason Strait

Legend

- (C) Team captain
- Injured

Mapua plays the Battle of Intramuros, so named after the Manila district, with the Letran Knights and the Lyceum Pirates.

== Head coaches ==
- Until 1948: Ignacio Sevilla
- Since 1949: Johnny Schlobohm
- Until 1978: Valerio Lopez
- 1978–1982: Carlos Badion
- 1983–1984: De Jesus
- 1985–1987: Art Trajano
- 1987–1997: Joel Banal
- 1997–1998: Bong Ramos
- 1999: Horacio Lim
- 2000–2001: Nic Jorge
- 2002–2006: Horacio Lim
- 2007–2008: Leo Isaac
- 2009–2012: Chito Victolero
- 2012–2018: Atoy Co
- 2019–2025: Randy Alcantara
- 2026–present: Chito Victolero

== Season-by-season records ==
Season	League	Elimination round						Playoffs			
Season	League	Pos	GP	W	L	PCT	GB	GP	W	L	Results
1999	NCAA	6th/8	14	6	8	.429	3	Did not qualify			
2000	NCAA	5th/8	14	5	9	.357	6	Did not qualify			
2001	NCAA	3rd/8	14	9	5	.643	2	2	1	1	Lost semifinals vs San Sebastian
2002	NCAA	5th/8	14	7	7	.500	4	Did not qualify			
2003	NCAA	4th/8	14	7	7	.500	2	1	0	1	Lost semifinals vs Letran
2004	NCAA	5th/8	14	7	7	.500	3	1	0	1	Lost 4th seed playoff vs San Beda
2005	NCAA	3rd/8	14	9	5	.643	4	1	0	1	Lost semifinals vs PCU
2006	NCAA	4th/8	14	7	7	.500	6	1	0	1	Lost semifinals vs San Beda
2007	NCAA	4th/7	12	6	6	.500	5	1	0	1	Lost semifinals vs San Beda
2008	NCAA	4th/8	14	9	5	.643	2	4	2	2	Lost semifinals vs San Beda
2009	NCAA	7th/10	18	6	12	.333	10	Did not qualify			
2010	NCAA	4th/9	16	9	7	.563	7	1	0	1	Lost stepladder round 1 vs JRU
2011	NCAA	5th/10	18	7	11	.389	9	Did not qualify			
2012	NCAA	6th/10	18	8	10	.444	7	Did not qualify			
2013	NCAA	10th/10	18	2	16	.111	13	Did not qualify			
2014	NCAA	10th/10	18	4	14	.222	9	Did not qualify			
2015	NCAA	3rd/10	18	12	6	.667	1	3	2	1	Lost semifinals vs Letran
2016	NCAA	3rd/10	18	12	6	.667	2	1	0	1	Lost semifinals vs Arellano
2017	NCAA	10th/10	18	3	15	.167	15	Did not qualify			
2018	NCAA	7th/10	18	6	12	.333	11	Did not qualify			
2019	NCAA	6th/10	18	9	9	.500	9	Did not qualify			
2020 (Note: Season cancelled due to the COVID-19 pandemic.)	NCAA	Season canceled									
2021 (Note: Season postponed to early 2022 due to the COVID-19 pandemic.)	NCAA	2nd/10	9	7	2	.778	2	4	1	3	Lost Finals vs Letran
2022	NCAA	6th/10	18	7	11	.389	7	Did not qualify			
2023	NCAA	1st/10	18	15	3	.833	—	4	2	2	Lost Finals vs San Beda
2024	NCAA	1st/10	18	15	3	.833	—	3	3	0	Won Finals vs Benilde
2025	NCAA	3rd/5	13	7	6	.538	2	2	1	1	Lost quarterfinals vs Benilde
2026	NCAA	4th/5	13	7	6	.538	3	2	1	1	Lost quarterfinals vs Letran

== Honors ==
=== Team honors ===
- National Collegiate Athletic Association (NCAA)
  - Champions (6): 1949, 1965. 1981, 1990, 1991, 2025

=== Player honors ===
- NCAA Most Valuable Player
  - Atoy Co (1): 1971
  - Freddie Hubalde (1): 1973
  - Leo Isaac (1): 1981
  - Alvin Patrimonio (2): 1985, 1986
  - Ruben dela Rosa (1): 1995
  - Kelvin dela Peña (1): 2007
  - Allwell Oraeme (2): 2015, 2016
  - Clint Escamis (1): 2023
- NCAA Finals Most Valuable Player
  - Clint Escamis (1): 2024
- NCAA Rookie of the Year
  - Kelvin dela Peña: 2005
  - Allan Mangahas: 2008
  - Josan Nimes: 2011
  - Allwell Oraeme: 2015
  - Clint Escamis: 2023
  - Chris Hubilla: 2024
- NCAA Freshman of the Year
  - Chris Hubilla: 2024
- NCAA Defensive Player of the Year
  - Allwell Oraeme (2): 2015, 2016
