= JRU–San Sebastian rivalry =

Fillipino athletic rivalry

JRU–San Sebastian men's basketball rivalry
- JRU Heavy Bombers San Sebastian Golden Stags
- Sport: Men's basketball
- Latest meeting: October 9, 2026 (Philsports Arena, Pasig); JRU, 102–78
- Next meeting: TBA

Statistics
- All-time record: NCAA Final Four (Philippines) appearances: San Sebastian 15; JRU 13; Titles: San Sebastian: NCAA 12; JRU: NCAA 6
- Longest win streak: San Sebastian, 7 (2001–2003, 2009–2012, 2018–2023)
- Current win streak: JRU, 2 (2025–present)

This rivalry is between Recto's San Sebastian College and Shaw's José Rizal University. The rivalry is played at the National Collegiate Athletic Association (Philippines).

Locations of San Sebastian (gold) and JRU (blue).

== History ==
The rivalry started in 1972 when José Rizal was playing in the championship against new member San Sebastian. The Heavy Bombers was bannered by Philip Cezar, David Cezar, Ed Carvajal, Jess Sta. Maria, Cris Calilan, Olimpio Santos, Jimmy Santos and Norberto Rivera. San Sebastian has their own superstar with the like of Dave Supnet. JRU (JRC then) captured the NCAA crown which up to this date is the last time José Rizal won a championship. Years later the two teams again figured in a mini rivalry, San Sebastian's Paul Alvarez and José Rizal's Vergel Meneses figured in a PABL Slam Dunk contest in 1987 in which Meneses won the contest. As contrasted with SSC-R's five consecutive championships in the 1990s, JRC continued to struggle and not until 1999 where the Heavy Bombers made it to the finals but lost to the defending champion Letran Knights.

In 2000, the Golden Stags and the Heavy Bombers met in the Final Four. JRC clinched the No. 1 seed while SSC-R got the 4th seed. The Stags defeated the Bombers twice to advance to the Finals against CSB. Thus, the Stags became the second (Letran did the trick in 1999 also against the Stags) 4th seed to upset the 1st seed in the Final Four. SSC-R and JRU also met in the 2001 Finals. JRU was bannered by Ariel Capus, season MVP Ernani Epondulan, Rodel Milla, Joel Finuliar and razzle dazzle pointguard Erwin Estebal while San Sebastian was led by Mark Macapagal, Christian Coronel and Jam Alfad. JRU lost in the series, which included a 33-point blowout loss in the deciding Game 3. Coronel was named as the 2001 NCAA Finals MVP.

The rivalry continued during Final Four appearances of both schools from 2002 and 2003. Not until the 2007 NCAA season when San Sebastian's Final Four chances was denied by José Rizal via a 7-point winning margin in a come from behind victory. The Stags was ahead by 7 points against the Heavy Bombers 1:10 to go in regulation. José Rizal capitalized on the errors of San Sebastian and force an overtime to win the game. This allowed JRU to grab the number 3 spot in the Final Four. JRU had another part in eliminating SSC-R in the 2008 season when they were tied for the number 2 seed with two other teams; in the ensuing classification playoffs JRU and San Sebastian met in the first round to decide which team will figure in a playoff for the No. 2 seed; the Heavy Bombers won the game and relegated San Sebastian to the fourth-seed playoffs where they were eliminated. In 2009 San Sebastian and JRU renewed their rivalry once again in the Final Four wherein a Jimbo Aquino-less-Golden Stags (whose serving a one game-suspension after committing a flagrant foul against San Beda for the 1st-seed playoff which also barred him from getting any individual awards) were beaten by the Heavy Bombers 72–65 in Game 1, But in Game 2 of their semifinals series with Jimbo Aquino returning from his suspension The Stags defeated The Heavy Bombers 79–64 and the Stags entered the Finals for the first time since 2003 wherein the Stags lose against the Letran Knights in 3 games.

Eventually the Stags won the championship against the four-peat seeking Red Lions wherein the Stags had its vengeance on the Red Lions via sweep The Stags' Jimbo Aquino was named the 2009 NCAA Finals MVP and ending San Beda's dynasty San Sebastian won its last title since 2002 when they swept the St. Benilde Blazers. In 2010 San Sebastian and JRU once again met in the playoffs for the third consecutive year and second in the semifinals with San Beda's sweep of the elimination round which led to a stepladder format in the semifinals JRU and Mapúa figure it out in the first round in which JRU won 60–54 The Heavy Bombers advance to the next round against the defending champions San Sebastian Stags. But in that Part III of San Sebastian-JRU. San Sebastian won the game 61–52, completing a season series sweep against the Heavy Bombers (also in 2002 and 2003) and making it a second consecutive finals appearance for the Golden Stags and faces last years' Finals tormentor and losing finalist San Beda Red Lions. In 2017 both San Sebastian & JRU met in the semifinals for the first time since 2010 with the top-seeded Lyceum swept the regular season. the 3rd-seeded Heavy Bombers (who swept the Golden Stags in the regular season that will give them an advantage) faces the 4th-seeded Golden Stags (who survive a scare from a stubborn Letran team that pave the way for them to enter the semifinals) but in that San Sebastian-JRU game was different as the Golden Stags emerged victorious after San Sebastian blew the game wide open as they led by 26 points heading in the 4th quarter despite JRU putting San Sebastian into the penalty situation early in the 4th quarter and managing to cut the deficit by at least 15 points but the resilient Golden Stags still won the game over the Heavy Bombers 85–73, to advanced to another knockout match against defending champions San Beda Red Lions.

== Head-to-head record by sport ==
=== Seniors' Division ===
==== General Championship ====
San Sebastian leads the general championship race with 4–0.

- San Sebastian (4) - 1984–85, 1988–89, 1989–90, 1994–95
- JRU (0)

=== Juniors' Division ===
==== General Championship ====
San Sebastian leads the general championship race with 6–0.

- San Sebastian (6) - 2005, 2006, 2009, 2010, 2011, 2012
- JRU (0)

== Basketball Statistics ==
=== Men's basketball results ===
The final four was instituted in 1997; prior to that the first and second round winners, plus the team with the best overall standing if it did not win either round, participated in the championship round to determine the champion.

==== Pre-Final Four era ====
JRC victories	San Sebastian victories

No.	Date	Location	Winner	Score	Note/s
1	1972*	Rizal Memorial Coliseum	JRC	1–0	
2	1982	Rizal Memorial Coliseum	JRC	82–76	
3	1986	Rizal Memorial Coliseum	JRC	93–92	(Note: Taking the first round pennant was San Sebastian, losing only to Jose Rizal College, 92–93.)
4	1987	Rizal Memorial Coliseum	San Sebastian	1–0	(Note: San Sebastian clinched the first round pennant in the first round winning against Letran in their game, after a loss against Perpetual Help.)
5	1987	Rizal Memorial Coliseum	San Sebastian	1–0	(Note: Letran denied San Sebastian the outright championship with a 94–91 overtime victory.)
6	1988	Rizal Memorial Coliseum	San Sebastian	1–0	(Note: JRC is winless in the second round.)
7	1990	Rizal Memorial Coliseum	San Sebastian	1–0	(Note: JRC is winless in the first round.)
8	1990	Rizal Memorial Coliseum	San Sebastian	1–0	(Note: San Sebastian swept the second round.)

No.	Date	Location	Winner	Score	Note/s
9	1992	Rizal Memorial Coliseum	San Sebastian	1–0	(Note: JRC is winless in the first round.)
10	1992	Rizal Memorial Coliseum	San Sebastian	1–0	(Note: San Sebastian only lost to Letran in the second round.)
11	1996	Rizal Memorial Coliseum	San Sebastian	1–0	(Note: San Sebastian swept the first round.)
12	1996	Rizal Memorial Coliseum	San Sebastian	1–0	(Note: JRC only won against PCU in the second round.)
13	1996	Rizal Memorial Coliseum	San Sebastian	1–0	(Note: San Sebastian swept the first round.)
14	1996	Rizal Memorial Coliseum	San Sebastian	1–0	(Note: San Sebastian swept the first round and JRC only won against PCU in the second round.)
15	1996	Rizal Memorial Coliseum	San Sebastian	1–0	(Note: San Sebastian swept the first round and JRC only won against PCU in the second round.)
(*) = finals games; (^) = semifinals; (≠) = seeding playoffs

==== Final Four era ====
José Rizal University (JRU) was formerly known as José Rizal College (JRC) until it received university status from the Commission on Higher Education (CHED) in the year 2000. Both teams are expected to meet at least 2 times per year.

JRU victories	San Sebastian victories	Forfeits

No.	Date	Location	Winner	Score	Note/s
1	2000	Rizal Memorial Coliseum	JRU	79–74	
2	2000	Rizal Memorial Coliseum	San Sebastian	87–76	
3	October 3, 2000^	Rizal Memorial Coliseum	San Sebastian	60–53	(Note: Semifinals Game 1. JRU had a twice-to-beat advantage prior to the game. San Sebastian forced a rubber match. Trailing 22-38 at the half of Game 1, the Heavy Bombers greeted the second half with a fierce 18-0 run to lead by two, with 11:37 to go, but the Stags' Nurjamjam Alfad and Christian Coronel conspired to defeat the Heavy Bombers and secured the win. Alfad finished with 14 points while Coronel sank the important free throws to win the game.)
4	October 6, 2000^	Rizal Memorial Coliseum	San Sebastian	97–79	(Note: The Stags dominated the Heavy Bombers all throughout Game 2. Mark Macapagal pumped in 25 points, Christian Coronel had 19, and Nicole Uy contributed 15, including a one-handed slam that punctuated the Stags' dominance of the Heavy Bombers. San Sebastian lost to Benilde in the finals.)
5	July 7, 2001	Araneta Coliseum	JRU	55–54	(Note: Opening game.)
6	September 15, 2001	Rizal Memorial Coliseum	JRU	81–75	
7	September 27, 2001*	Rizal Memorial Coliseum	San Sebastian	77–74	(Note: Finals Game 1. The two teams clashed neck-to-neck all throughout Game 1 but the Stags are the better team in crunch time. The Heavy Bombers entered the final quarter with the lead when the Stags applied its pressure defense. Stags' Roy Falcasantos converted a layup in the last 48 seconds of the game to break a 74-all tieup then later converted a charity to give his team the win.)
8	September 29, 2001*	Rizal Memorial Coliseum	JRU	95–81	(Note: Finals Game 2. JRU relied on the offense of season MVP Nani Epondulan, Joel Finuliar, Rendel Dela Rea, and Ariel Capus to register a 68–54 lead in the final quarter of Game 2 to keep the Stags at bay and then finally made a comeback to the series.)
9	October 2, 2001*	Rizal Memorial Coliseum	San Sebastian	95–62	(Note: Finals Game 3. Showing experience, the Stags never faltered from the start of Game 3, as they outclassed the Heavy Bombers by 33 points en route to their 10th NCAA championship. Nani Epondulan, the season MVP, tallied 13 points in the first half, but was made scoreless in the second half.)
10	July 29, 2002	Rizal Memorial Coliseum	San Sebastian	83–75	
11	September 4, 2002	Rizal Memorial Coliseum	San Sebastian	101–82	
12	September 11, 2002^	Rizal Memorial Coliseum	San Sebastian	102–96^{OT}	(Note: Semifinals. It was a nip-and-tuck affair all game until JRU's Edward Attunga converted two free throws to give his team its first lead of the game, 85–84, with 59 seconds left. San Sebastian's Redentor Vicente was fouled on a drive, but split his charities to tie the game at 85-all with 22 seconds remaining in the final period. JRU's Wynsjohn Te had a chance to win the game but missed a difficult lay-up, sending the game into overtime. Defending champs San Sebastian's trifecta of Redentor Vicente, Clark Moore, and Michael Gonzales needed an extra five minutes to beat the Heavy Bombers and advance to the Finals. San Sebastian won against Benilde in the finals.)
13	June 28, 2003	Araneta Coliseum	San Sebastian	81–77	(Note: Opening game.)
14	August 25, 2003	Rizal Memorial Coliseum	San Sebastian	83–76	
15	September 10, 2003^	Rizal Memorial Coliseum	San Sebastian	81–73	(Note: Semifinals. The Stags used an explosive run in the third quarter to put the Heavy Bombers for good. San Sebastian's Redentor Vicente led the Stags with 19 points, including eight straight in a 10-0 run in the third quarter and gave San Sebastian its biggest lead, 62-53. San Sebastian lost to Letran in the finals.)
16	July 21, 2004	Rizal Memorial Coliseum	JRU	81–79	
17	August 6, 2004	Rizal Memorial Coliseum	San Sebastian	73–65	
18	July 22, 2005	Cuneta Astrodome	JRU	67–55	(Note: JRU had a 0-6 record prior to the game.)
19	August 15, 2005	Cuneta Astrodome	San Sebastian	65–60	(Note: San Sebastian lost to Letran in the finals.)
20	2006	Rizal Memorial Coliseum	San Sebastian	95–86	
21	2006	Rizal Memorial Coliseum	JRU	89–76	
22	June 27, 2007	The Arena in San Juan	JRU	68–66	
23	August 29, 2007	The Arena in San Juan	JRU	80–73^{OT}	(Note: JRU lost to Letran in the semifinals.)
24	2008	Cuneta Astrodome	San Sebastian	57–54	
25	2008	Cuneta Astrodome	San Sebastian	52–47	(Note: San Sebastian was on a 6-game winning streak prior to the game.)
26	September 15, 2008≠	Cuneta Astrodome	#2 JRU	57–53	(Note: Classification round. JRU lost to San Beda in the finals.)
27	August 3, 2009	Filoil Flying V Arena	San Sebastian	91–76	(Note: Both teams had a 6-0 record prior to the game. San Sebastian gave JRU its first loss of the season)
28	October 7, 2009	Filoil Flying V Arena	San Sebastian	84–78	
29	October 16, 2009^	Filoil Flying V Arena	JRU	72–65	(Note: Semifinals. JRU forced a rubber match.)
30	October 19, 2009^	Filoil Flying V Arena	San Sebastian	79–64	(Note: Semifinals. San Sebastian won against San Beda in the finals.)
31	2010	Filoil Flying V Arena	San Sebastian	68–49	(Note: San Sebastian had a 4-0 record prior to the game.)
32	2010	Filoil Flying V Arena	San Sebastian	64–59	

No.	Date	Location	Winner	Score	Note/s
33	October 8, 2010^	Filoil Flying V Arena	San Sebastian	61–52	(Note: Second round stepladder semifinals. San Sebastian lost to San Beda in the finals.)
34	July 2, 2011	Filoil Flying V Arena	San Sebastian	73–67	(Note: Opening day game.)
35	September 7, 2011	Filoil Flying V Arena	San Sebastian	78–59	(Note: San Sebastian had an 11-0 record prior to the game.)
36	July 14, 2012	Filoil Flying V Arena	San Sebastian	101–78	
37	September 27, 2012	Filoil Flying V Arena	JRU	82–74	(Note: San Sebastian lost to Letran in the semifinals.)
38	July 27, 2013	Filoil Flying V Arena	JRU	67–63	
39	October 7, 2013	Filoil Flying V Arena	San Sebastian	71–62	(Note: San Sebastian lost to Letran in the semifinals.)
40	July 2, 2014	Filoil Flying V Arena	San Sebastian	88–81	
41	October 6, 2014	Filoil Flying V Arena	JRU	82–77	(Note: JRU lost to Arellano in the semifinals.)
42	July 14, 2015	Filoil Flying V Arena	San Sebastian	91–89^{OT}	
43	October 9, 2015	Filoil Flying V Arena	JRU	91–69	(Note: JRU lost to San Beda in the semifinals.)
44	August 2, 2016	Filoil Flying V Arena	JRU	68–62	
45	September 22, 2016	Filoil Flying V Arena	San Sebastian	85–58	
46	August 24, 2017	SSC–R Cavite Gym	JRU	73–62	(Note: NCAA on Tour.)
47	October 6, 2017	Filoil Flying V Arena	JRU	60–58	
48	October 27, 2017≠	Filoil Flying V Arena	#3 San Sebastian	85–73	(Note: Stepladder semifinals. This is the first playoff appearance for JRU since 2015, and the first for San Sebastian since 2013. San Sebastian lost to San Beda in stepladder semifinals round 2.)
49	July 24, 2018	Filoil Flying V Arena	San Sebastian	~~86~~–~~76~~ (Note: San Sebastian originally won 86–76.The NCAA forfeited the game in favor of JRU after San Sebastian player RK Ilagan was ruled ineligible to play for playing in a ligang labas game.)	
50	September 20, 2018	Filoil Flying V Arena	San Sebastian	82–75	
51	July 9, 2019	Filoil Flying V Arena	San Sebastian	82–51	
52	October 3, 2019	Filoil Flying V Arena	San Sebastian	62–59	(Note: San Sebastian lost to Letran in the First round stepladder semifinals.)
53	April 19, 2022	St. Benilde Gym	San Sebastian	70–64	
54	October 28, 2022	Filoil EcoOil Centre	San Sebastian	72–68	
55	November 11, 2022	Filoil EcoOil Centre	San Sebastian	92–74	
56	October 10, 2023	Filoil EcoOil Centre	San Sebastian	72–59	
57	October 27, 2023	Filoil EcoOil Centre	JRU	79–72	
58	September 18, 2024	Filoil EcoOil Centre	JRU	90–74	(Note: JRU had a 0–3 record prior to the game.)
59	October 16, 2024	Filoil EcoOil Centre	San Sebastian	87–85	(Note: San Sebastian was on an 8-game losing skid prior to the game.)
60	October 15, 2025	Playtime Filoil Centre	JRU	59–46	
61	October 9, 2026	Philsports Arena	JRU	102–78	(Note: San Sebastian had a 0-6 record prior to the game.)
Series: San Sebastian leads 38–23
(*) = finals games; (^) = semifinals; (≠) = seeding playoffs

=== Juniors' Basketball Results ===
==== Pre-Final Four era ====
JRC victories	San Sebastian victories

No.	Date	Location	Winner	Score	Note/s
1	1988	Rizal Memorial Coliseum	JRC	1–0	
2	1988	Rizal Memorial Coliseum	JRC	1–0	(Note: JRC only lost to San Beda in the first and second round. JRC lost to San Beda in the finals.)

No.	Date	Location	Winner	Score	Note/s
3	1990	Rizal Memorial Coliseum	JRC	1–0	(Note: JRC only lost to San Beda and Letran in the second round.)
(*) = finals games; (^) = semifinals; (≠) = seeding playoffs

==== Final Four era ====
Both teams are expected to meet at least 2 times per year.

JRU victories	San Sebastian victories

No.	Date	Location	Winner	Score	Note/s
1	July 16, 2007	The Arena in San Juan	San Sebastian	109–96	
2	July 30, 2007	The Arena in San Juan	San Sebastian	79–71	
3	September 12, 2007^	Araneta Coliseum	San Sebastian	85–74	(Note: Semifinals. San Sebastian won against Letran in the finals.)
4	2008	Cuneta Astrodome	San Sebastian	89–65	
5	2008	Cuneta Astrodome	San Sebastian	97–88^{OT}	(Note: San Sebastian completed an elimination round sweep after defeating JRU. San Sebastian won against Letran in the finals.)
6	2009	Filoil Flying V Arena	JRU	93–87	
7	2009	Filoil Flying V Arena	San Sebastian	66–63	
8	2010	Filoil Flying V Arena	JRU	70–69	
9	2010	Filoil Flying V Arena	San Sebastian	78–70	(Note: JRU lost to Letran in the playoffs, while San Sebastian lost to San Beda in the finals.)
10	2011	Filoil Flying V Arena	San Sebastian	70–58	
11	2011	Filoil Flying V Arena	JRU	50–48	
12	2012	Filoil Flying V Arena	San Sebastian	66–40	
13	2012	Filoil Flying V Arena	San Sebastian	79–70	(Note: San Sebastian lost to San Beda in the finals.)
14	2013	Filoil Flying V Arena	San Sebastian	80–63	
15	2013	Filoil Flying V Arena	San Sebastian	74–68	(Note: San Sebastian lost to LSGH in the Stepladder round 2.)
16	2014	Filoil Flying V Arena	JRU	75–60	
17	2014	Filoil Flying V Arena	JRU	99–83	(Note: JRU lost to Malayan in the semifinals.)

No.	Date	Location	Winner	Score	Note/s
18	2015	Filoil Flying V Arena	San Sebastian	75–56	
19	2015	Filoil Flying V Arena	JRU	70–66	
20	2016	Filoil Flying V Arena	JRU	68–60	
21	2016	Filoil Flying V Arena	JRU	63–60	
22	2017	SSC–R Gym	San Sebastian	71–60	
23	2017	Filoil Flying V Arena	JRU	84–76	(Note: San Sebastian lost to LSGH in the fourth-seed playoff.)
24	2018	Filoil Flying V Arena	San Sebastian	92–78	
25	2018	Filoil Flying V Arena	JRU	75–56	
26	2019	Filoil Flying V Arena	JRU	72–68	
27	2019	Filoil Flying V Arena	San Sebastian	94–91	(Note: San Sebastian lost to Lyceum–Cavite in the semifinals.)
28	2023	Emilio Aguinaldo College Gym	San Sebastian	81–70	(Note: San Sebastian lost to San Beda in the Playoff #1.)
29	February 23, 2024	Filoil EcoOil Centre	JRU	68–62	
30	March 10, 2025	Filoil EcoOil Centre	San Sebastian	68–58	
31	October 15, 2025	Playtime Filoil Centre	JRU	77–73	
32	October 9, 2026	Playtime Filoil Centre	JRU	102–78	
Series: San Sebastian leads 18–14
(*) = finals games; (^) = semifinals; (≠) = seeding playoffs

=== Final Four Rankings ===
For comparison, these are the rankings of these two teams since the Final Four format was introduced.

==== Seniors' division ====
Team ╲ Year	1997	1998	1999	2000	2001	2002	2003	2004	2005	2006	2007	2008	2009	2010	2011	2012	2013	2014	2015	2016	2017	2018	2019	2020	2021 (Note: 2021-22 season was played in early 2022 and the tournament was held in into a round robin tournament instead of the usual double round eliminations.)	2022	2023	2024
San Sebastian	1	2	1	4	2	1	2	6	4	6	5	5	2	2	2	2	3	8	7	7	4	6	4	8	C	5	8	9
JRU	6	7	2	1	1	4	3	7	8	7	3	2	3	3	4	5	8	3	4	5	3	10	8	10	C	9	6	10

==== Juniors' division ====
Team ╲ Year	1997	1998	1999	2000	2001	2002	2003	2004	2005	2006	2007	2008	2009	2010	2011	2012	2013	2014	2015	2016	2017	2018	2019	2020	2021	2022	2023 (Note: 2023-24 season was played in early 2024 and the tournament was held in into a round robin tournament instead of the usual double round eliminations.)
San Sebastian									1	2	1	1	3	2	6	2	2	6	8	10	5	8	3	C	C	5	3
JRU									4	4	4	3	4	6	8	7	5	4	9	8	9	4	6	C	C	9	8

Legend * Number denotes playoff seeding. Shade denotes final position.
Finished as the champion
Finished as the 1st runner-up
Finished as semifinalist
Lost in 4th-seed playoff
Twice to beat advantage
C Tournament cancelled

== See also ==
- San Sebastian Stags
- National Collegiate Athletic Association (Philippines)
- San Beda–Letran rivalry
- San Beda–San Sebastian rivalry
- San Sebastian–Letran rivalry
- San Beda–Perpetual rivalry
- Battle of Intramuros
