= Battle of Intramuros =

"Battle of Intramuros" may also refer to the several Battles fought over Manila.

Locations of Letran (blue), Lyceum (gray), and Mapúa (red).

The Battle of Intramuros is the rivalry between the Colegio de San Juan de Letran Knights, Lyceum of the Philippines University Pirates, and Mapúa University Cardinals, all three representing universities within walking distance from each other at Manila's Intramuros district. The rivalry is played at the National Collegiate Athletic Association (Philippines).

The rivalry is notable for the fact that, even though Letran performs better in league competition, they have never swept the elimination round meetings against their neighbors in recent years.

The Battle of Intramuros may also refer to the older rivalry between University of the Philippines Diliman (UP) and Ateneo de Manila, which first began on 1915 when UP and Ateneo played basketball games on Intramuros. Eventually, the rivalry died down and was revived when both schools competed in the University Athletic Association of the Philippines. It is now called the "Battle of Katipunan," named after the avenue that connects Ateneo's new campus at Quezon City and UP, which transferred to Quezon City after the war.

== Letran vs. Mapúa ==
Letran–Mapúa men's basketball rivalry
- Letran Knights Mapúa Cardinals
- Other names: Battle of Intramuros
- Sport: Men's basketball
- Latest meeting: October 12, 2026 (Playtime Filoil Centre, San Juan); Mapúa, 69–67^{OT}
- Next meeting: TBA

Statistics
- All-time record: NCAA Final Four (Philippines) appearances: Letran 18; Mapúa 13; Titles: Letran: NCAA 20; Mapúa: NCAA 6
- Longest win streak: Letran, 9 (2011–2015)
- Current win streak: Mapúa, 1 (2026–present)

=== Men's basketball results ===
The final four was instituted in 1997; prior to that the first and second round winners, plus the team with the best overall standing if it did not win either round, participated in the championship round to determine the champion.

The "Battle of Intramuros," which is so named because the two schools are three blocks apart from each other in Intramuros, is the name given to the Letran-Mapúa games. The Cardinals have had the mastery of the Knights in recent years. For eight consecutive years from 1998, Letran has failed to beat Mapúa in the eliminations rounds at least twice (either they will split the eliminations or Mapúa will win twice), even though the Knights were more successful in the league.

The Knights were finally able to beat Mapúa in the first round of the 2005 tournament, but the Cardinals avenged that loss in the second round when they dealt the Knights with their first and only defeat of the season. Letran Knights were on their way on scoring a rare a 14–0 sweep of the elimination round when they were stopped by the Mapúa Cardinals in their twelfth game of the eliminations Letran and Mapúa would split their games in subsequent seasons. In 2009 Letran finally end its 2nd-round losing streak against Mapúa and its first sweep against their Intramuros rivals in league history

Although the only instance where Letran and Mapúa met in the Finals until 2021 was in the 1979 season where the Knights prevailed, the championship won by the Cardinals in 1981 (the games were suspended in the 1980 season due to the La Salle–Letran fracas) proved to be a spoiler once again as it denied Letran the bragging rights to the unprecedented honor of being the first ever NCAA team to win five consecutive seniors championships (Letran also won the 1982, 1983, and 1984 crowns), a feat that would later on be achieved by the San Sebastian Stags from 1993 to 1997.

==== Pre-Final Four era ====
Letran victories	Mapúa victories

No.	Date	Location	Winner	Score	Note/s
1	1982	Rizal Memorial Coliseum	Letran	100–90	
2	1986	Rizal Memorial Coliseum	Mapúa	84–82	
3	1990	Rizal Memorial Coliseum	Letran	95–72	
4	September 4, 1990	Rizal Memorial Coliseum	Mapúa	111–105	
5	July 22, 1992	Rizal Memorial Coliseum	Mapúa	76–70	

No.	Date	Location	Winner	Score	Note/s
6	August 22, 1992	Rizal Memorial Coliseum	Mapúa	78–66	
7	August 10, 1993	Rizal Memorial Coliseum	Mapúa	79–65	
8	September 8, 1993	Rizal Memorial Coliseum	Mapúa	75–64	
(*) = finals games; (^) = semifinals; (≠) = seeding playoffs

==== Final Four era ====
Both teams are guaranteed to face each other at the elimination round (regular season) twice, while they can meet for a maximum of three times in the playoffs.

Letran victories	Mapúa victories	Forfeits

No.	Date	Location	Winner	Score	Note/s
1	October 1, 1997≠	Rizal Memorial Coliseum	#3 Letran	68–57	(Note: Stepladder Semifinals 1st round. Letran lost to San Beda in the Stepladder Semifinals 2nd round.)
2	August 4, 1998	Rizal Memorial Coliseum	Mapúa	82–71	
3	September 8, 1998	Rizal Memorial Coliseum	Mapúa	62–60	
4	August 17, 1999	Rizal Memorial Coliseum	Mapúa	67–60	
5	September 7, 1999	Rizal Memorial Coliseum	Mapúa	78–61	
6	2000	Rizal Memorial Coliseum	Letran	75–50	
7	2000	Rizal Memorial Coliseum	Mapúa	59–57	
8	July 25, 2001	Rizal Memorial Coliseum	Mapúa	76–71	
9	September 18, 2001	Rizal Memorial Coliseum	Mapúa	62–55	
10	July 26, 2002	Rizal Memorial Coliseum	Letran	76–73	
11	September 4, 2002	Rizal Memorial Coliseum	Mapúa	80–71	
12	June 28, 2003	Rizal Memorial Coliseum	Mapúa	66–58	(Note: Opening game.)
13	August 13, 2003	Makati Coliseum	Mapúa	77–67	
14	September 10, 2003^	Rizal Memorial Coliseum	Letran	72–66	(Note: Semifinals. Letran went on to win the championship vs. San Sebastian.)
15	July 2, 2004	Rizal Memorial Coliseum	Mapúa	86–76	
16	August 20, 2004	Rizal Memorial Coliseum	Mapúa	62–60	
17	July 20, 2005	Cuneta Astrodome	Letran	69–67	(Note: Letran had a 5–0 record prior to the game.)
18	August 24, 2005	Cuneta Astrodome	Mapúa	71–66	(Note: Letran had an 11–0 record prior to the game.)
19	July 21, 2006	Ninoy Aquino Stadium	Letran	74–71	(Note: Letran had a 5–0 record prior to the game.)
20	August 23, 2006	Ninoy Aquino Stadium	Mapúa	54–49	
21	June 23, 2007	Araneta Coliseum	Letran	84–80	(Note: Opening day game.)
22	August 8, 2007	The Arena in San Juan	Mapúa	89–82	
23	July 23, 2008	Cuneta Astrodome	Letran	67–60	(Note: Letran had a 5–0 record prior to the game.)
24	August 29, 2008	Cuneta Astrodome	Mapúa	69–52	
25	September 15, 2008≠	Cuneta Astrodome	#3 Letran	62–52	(Note: 2nd–4th classification. Both teams tied with 9–5 records along with 2 others necessitated games to break the ties.)
26	July 13, 2009	Filoil Flying V Arena	Letran	73–51	
27	August 24, 2009	Filoil Flying V Arena	Letran	70–65	(Note: Letran ends an 8-year 2nd round losing skid against Mapúa. Letran's 1st sweep against Mapúa and Letran eliminated Mapúa from the semifinals contention.)
28	July 30, 2010	Filoil Flying V Arena	Mapúa	66–51	(Note: Mapúa ends a 6-year 1st round losing skid and a 3-game losing skid against Letran since 2008.)
29	August 25, 2010	Filoil Flying V Arena	Mapúa	63–60	(Note: Letran was leading with as much as 14 points in the last 3 minutes until Mapúa surges and regains the lead and eventually wins. Mapúa's 1st sweep against Letran since 2004.)
30	July 2, 2011	Araneta Coliseum	Letran	76–65	(Note: Opening day game.)
31	September 7, 2011	Filoil Flying V Arena	Letran	69–67^{OT}	

No.	Date	Location	Winner	Score	Note/s
32	July 16, 2012	Filoil Flying V Arena	Letran	66–60	
33	August 23, 2012	Filoil Flying V Arena	Letran	72–60	
34	July 6, 2013	Filoil Flying V Arena	Letran	87–68	(Note: Letran had a 6–0 record prior to the game.)
35	August 31, 2013	Filoil Flying V Arena	Letran	77–70	
36	July 9, 2014	Filoil Flying V Arena	Letran	79–67	
37	September 29, 2014	Filoil Flying V Arena	Letran	20–0	(Note: Mapúa forced to forfeit their game against Letran due to the suspensions of their players.)
38	August 14, 2015	Filoil Flying V Arena	Letran	80–77	(Note: Letran overcame a late Mapúa run in the 2nd half to win the game.)
39	September 15, 2015	Filoil Flying V Arena	Mapúa	82–77	(Note: Mapúa ends a 9-game losing skid to Letran since 2011 and a 4-year 2nd round losing skid since 2011.)
40	October 20, 2015^	Mall of Asia Arena	Letran	91–90	(Note: Semifinals. Letran went on to win the championship. vs. San Beda.)
41	August 9, 2016	Filoil Flying V Arena	Mapúa	79–75	(Note: Last game of the 1st round. Both teams had a 5–3 record prior to the game.)
42	September 13, 2016	Filoil Flying V Arena	Mapúa	77–72	(Note: Letran's loss to Mapúa would mean they'll miss the final four for the 1st time since 2014 and this is the 1st time that a defending champion would miss the playoffs since 2000, ironically the defending champion that miss the final four that time was the Knights themselves.)
43	July 11, 2017	Filoil Flying V Arena	Mapúa	78–75	(Note: Letran's first game of the season. As of September 22, 2017, this is Mapúa's only win of the season.)
44	September 22, 2017	Filoil Flying V Arena	Letran	88–79	
45	August 21, 2018	Filoil Flying V Arena	Letran	84–63	
46	September 21, 2018	Filoil Flying V Arena	Letran	84–69	
47	July 30, 2019	Filoil EcoOil Centre	Letran	89–84	
48	September 13, 2019	Filoil EcoOil Centre	Mapúa	105–101^{2OT}	
49	April 8, 2022	St. Benilde Gym	Letran	80–60	(Note: Both teams had 3–0 records prior to the game.)
50	May 15, 2022*	Filoil Flying V Arena	Letran	68–63	(Note: Finals Game 1.)
51	May 22, 2022*	Filoil Flying V Arena	Letran	75–65	(Note: Finals Game 2. Jeo Ambohot was named as the NCAA Season 97 Finals MVP.)
52	September 27, 2022	Filoil EcoOil Centre	Letran	67–62	
53	November 19, 2022	Filoil EcoOil Centre	Letran	74–58	
54	October 11, 2023	Filoil EcoOil Centre	Mapúa	77–71	(Note: Mapúa ended a 5-game losing skid against Letran since 2022, and sent Letran to its 6th straight loss of the season, the worst start for a defending champion.)
55	October 28, 2023	Filoil EcoOil Centre	Mapúa	69–66	(Note: Mapúa came from behind to take a close 69-66 victory over Letran.)
56	September 20, 2024	Filoil EcoOil Centre	Mapúa	77–62	(Note: Both teams had a 2–1 record and were on a two-game winning streak prior to the game.)
57	October 18, 2024	Filoil EcoOil Centre	Mapúa	86–78	
58	October 21, 2025	Playtime Filoil Centre	Letran	85–82^{OT}	(Note: Letran had a 3-game winning streak prior to the game after starting the season at 0-3.)
59	October 12, 2026	Playtime Filoil Centre	Mapúa	69–67^{OT}	(Note: Mapúa had a 3-game winning streak prior to the game after starting the season at 0-3.)
Series: Letran leads 31–28
(*) = finals games; (^) = semifinals; (≠) = seeding playoffs

==== Final Four Rankings ====
For comparison, these are the rankings of these two teams since the Final Four format was introduced.

==== Seniors' division ====
A.Y.	Letran	Mapua
1997–1998	3rd	4th
1998–1999	1st	
1999–2000	4th	6th
2000–2001	7th	5th
2001–2002	6th	3rd
2002–2003	6th	5th
2003–2004	1st	4th
2004–2005	3rd	5th
2005–2006	1st	3rd
2006–2007	3rd	4th
2007–2008	2nd	4th
2008–2009	3rd	4th
2009–2010	4th	6th
2010–2011	5th	4th
2011–2022	3rd	5th
2012–2013	3rd	6th
2013–2014	2nd	10th
2014–2015	6th	10th
2015–2016	2nd	3rd
2016–2017	6th	3rd
2017–2018	5th	10th
2018–2019	3rd	7th
2019–2020	3rd	6th
2021–2022	1st	2nd
2022–2023	2nd	7th
2023–2024	9th	1st
2024–2025	6th	1st

Finished as the champion
Finished as the 1st runner-up
Finished as the 2nd runner-up
Finished as the 3rd runner-up

=== Juniors basketball results ===
Juniors games between Letran and Mapúa have not been played under this label. While Letran's high school has always been at Intramuros, Mapúa's high schools have always been outside its walls, staying at the Santa Cruz district for most of its history, then the current Malayan High School of Science now being found at Pandacan.

== Letran vs. Lyceum ==
Letran–Lyceum men's basketball rivalry
- Letran Knights Lyceum Pirates
- Other names: Battle of Intramuros
- Sport: Men's basketball
- Latest meeting: October 8, 2026 (Playtime Filoil Centre, San Juan); Letran, 96–86
- Next meeting: TBA

Statistics
- All-time record: NCAA Final Four (Philippines) appearances: Letran 18; Lyceum 5; Titles: Letran: NCAA 20; Lyceum: NCAA 0
- Longest win streak: Letran, 5 (2011–2013); Lyceum, 5 (2016–2018)
- Current win streak: Letran, 2 (2025–present)

=== Men's basketball results ===
Both teams are guaranteed to face each other at the elimination round (regular season) twice, while they can meet for a maximum of three times in the playoffs.

Lyceum victories	Letran victories

No.	Date	Location	Winner	Score	Note/s
1	August 5, 2011	The Arena in San Juan	Letran	92–89^{OT}	
2	September 9, 2011	The Arena in San Juan	Letran	88–74	
3	August 2, 2012	The Arena in San Juan	Letran	70–60	
4	September 6, 2012	The Arena in San Juan	Letran	76–60	
5	July 20, 2013	The Arena in San Juan	Letran	61–53	(Note: Letran had a 4-0 record prior to the game.)
6	September 5, 2013	The Arena in San Juan	Lyceum	80–76	
7	July 4, 2014	The Arena in San Juan	Lyceum	74–70	
8	October 3, 2014	The Arena in San Juan	Letran	77–52	
9	August 4, 2015	The Arena in San Juan	Letran	83–78	(Note: Letran had a 6-0 record prior to the game.)
10	September 4, 2015	The Arena in San Juan	Letran	74–57	
11	August 5, 2016	The Arena in San Juan	Lyceum	75–72	
12	August 18, 2016	The Arena in San Juan	Lyceum	68–66	
13	August 18, 2017	The Arena in San Juan	Lyceum	78–75	(Note: Lyceum had a 7-0 record prior to the game.)
14	October 6, 2017	The Arena in San Juan	Lyceum	81–69	(Note: Lyceum had a 15-0 record prior to the game.)
15	August 17, 2018	The Arena in San Juan	Lyceum	87–82	(Note: Lyceum had a 7-0 record prior to the game.)
16	October 5, 2018	The Arena in San Juan	Letran	80–79	

No.	Date	Location	Winner	Score	Note/s
17	October 26, 2018^	The Arena in San Juan	Lyceum	109–85	(Note: First semifinals series between Letran and Lyceum since the latter joined the league in 2011. Lyceum lost to San Beda in the finals.)
18	July 7, 2019	Mall of Asia Arena	Lyceum	84–80	(Note: Opening day game.)
19	September 27, 2019	The Arena in San Juan	Lyceum	97–90	
20	November 8, 2019^	Cuneta Astrodome	Letran	92–88	(Note: Semifinals. Letran won in the finals vs San Beda.)
21	April 17, 2022	St. Benilde Gym	Letran	80–77	(Note: Letran had a 4-0 record prior to the game.)
22	October 2, 2022	Filoil EcoOil Centre	Lyceum	82–75	
23	October 28, 2022	Filoil EcoOil Centre	Letran	69–64	
24	November 29, 2022^	Filoil EcoOil Centre	Letran	67–58	(Note: Semifinals. Letran won in the finals vs Benilde.)
25	September 27, 2023	Filoil EcoOil Centre	Lyceum	70–69	
26	November 5, 2023	Filoil EcoOil Centre	Lyceum	85–79	
27	October 5, 2024	Filoil EcoOil Centre	Letran	78–66	
28	October 11, 2024	Filoil EcoOil Centre	Lyceum	91–68	
29	October 18, 2025	Playtime Filoil Centre	Letran	95–93^{OT}	
30	October 9, 2026	Playtime Filoil Centre	Letran	96–86	
Series: Letran leads 16–14
(*) = finals games; (^) = semifinals; (≠) = seeding playoffs

==== Final Four Rankings ====
For comparison, these are the rankings of these two teams since the Final Four format was introduced.

==== Seniors' division ====
A.Y.	Letran	Lyceum
2011–2022	3rd	6th
2012–2013	3rd	10th
2013–2014	2nd	6th
2014–2015	6th	7th
2015–2016	2nd	9th
2016–2017	6th	9th
2017–2018	5th	1st
2018–2019	3rd	2nd
2019–2020	3rd	2nd
2021–2022	1st	9th
2022–2023	2nd	3rd
2023–2024	9th	2nd
2024–2025	6th	4th

Finished as the champion
Finished as the 1st runner-up
Finished as the 2nd runner-up
Finished as the 3rd runner-up

=== Juniors basketball results ===
Juniors games between Letran and Lyceum have not been played under this label. While Letran's high school has always been at Intramuros, Lyceum's high school teams are represented by its Cavite campus.

== Lyceum vs. Mapúa ==
Lyceum–Mapúa men's basketball rivalry
- Lyceum Pirates Mapúa Cardinals
- Other names: Battle of Intramuros
- Sport: Men's basketball
- Latest meeting: November 12, 2026 (Playtime Filoil Centre, San Juan, Metro Manila); Mapúa, 83–68
- Next meeting: TBA

Statistics
- All-time record: NCAA Final Four (Philippines) appearances: Mapúa 13; Lyceum 5; Titles: Mapúa: NCAA 6; Lyceum: NCAA 0
- Longest win streak: Lyceum, 6 (2017–2019)
- Current win streak: Mapúa, 2 (2026–present)

=== Men's basketball results ===
Both teams are guaranteed to face each other at the elimination round (regular season) twice, while they can meet for a maximum of three times in the playoffs.

Lyceum victories	Mapúa victories

No.	Date	Location	Winner	Score	Note/s
1	July 18, 2011	The Arena in San Juan	Lyceum	76–73	
2	September 2, 2011	The Arena in San Juan	Mapúa	80–59	
3	July 12, 2012	The Arena in San Juan	Lyceum	78–74	
4	October 1, 2012	The Arena in San Juan	Mapúa	76–58	
5	July 6, 2013	The Arena in San Juan	Lyceum	74–59	
6	October 17, 2013	The Arena in San Juan	Lyceum	78–69	
7	July 14, 2014	The Arena in San Juan	Lyceum	80–78	
8	September 5, 2014	The Arena in San Juan	Mapúa	76–65	
9	July 31, 2015	The Arena in San Juan	Mapúa	109–95	
10	September 11, 2015	The Arena in San Juan	Mapúa	70–66	
11	July 12, 2016	The Arena in San Juan	Mapúa	75–64	(Note: Mapúa had a 2-0 record prior to the game.)
12	August 23, 2016	The Arena in San Juan	Mapúa	90–75	
13	August 25, 2017	The Arena in San Juan	Lyceum	97–74	(Note: NCAA on Tour. Lyceum had an 8-0 record prior to the game.)
14	September 5, 2017	The Arena in San Juan	Lyceum	96–90	(Note: Lyceum had a 9-0 record prior to the game.)
15	July 27, 2018	The Arena in San Juan	Lyceum	94–81	(Note: Lyceum had a 4-0 record prior to the game.)
16	October 2, 2018	The Arena in San Juan	Lyceum	92–76	
17	July 19, 2019	The Arena in San Juan	Lyceum	79–71	

No.	Date	Location	Winner	Score	Note/s
18	October 1, 2019	The Arena in San Juan	Lyceum	77–71	
19	April 27, 2022	St. Benilde Gym	Mapúa	75–65	(Note: First Lyceum-Mapúa NCAA game since the COVID-19 pandemic.)
20	September 14, 2022	Filoil EcoOil Centre	Lyceum	76–67	
21	October 16, 2022	Filoil EcoOil Centre	Mapúa	62–59	
22	October 14, 2023	Filoil EcoOil Centre	Mapúa	87–83	
23	November 3, 2023	Filoil EcoOil Centre	Lyceum	86–82	
24	September 24, 2024	Filoil EcoOil Centre	Lyceum	96–81	(Note: Lyceum and Mapúa were on a 2–game and 3–game winning streaks, respectively, prior to the game.)
25	October 29, 2024	Filoil EcoOil Centre	Mapúa	69–68	
26	November 23, 2024^	Cuneta Astrodome	Mapúa	89–79	(Note: Semifinals.Mapúa went on to win the Championship vs Benilde.)
27	October 1, 2025	Smart Araneta Coliseum	Mapúa	90–89^{2OT}	(Note: Opening day game.)
28	November 7, 2025	Playtime Filoil Centre	Mapúa	78–73	
29	September 21, 2026	PhilSports Arena	Lyceum	88–87	
30	November 9, 2026	Playtime Filoil Centre	Mapúa	71–68	
31	November 12, 2026≠	Playtime Filoil Centre	Mapúa	83–68	(Note: Play-in tournament.)
Series: Mapúa leads 16–15
(*) = finals games; (^) = semifinals; (≠) = seeding playoffs

==== Final Four Rankings ====
For comparison, these are the rankings of these two teams since the Final Four format was introduced.

==== Seniors' division ====
A.Y.	Lyceum	Mapua
2011–2022	6th	5th
2012–2013	10th	6th
2013–2014	6th	10th
2014–2015	7th	10th
2015–2016	9th	3rd
2016–2017	9th	3rd
2017–2018	1st	10th
2018–2019	2nd	7th
2019–2020	2nd	6th
2021–2022	9th	2nd
2022–2023	3rd	7th
2023–2024	2nd	1st
2024–2025	4th	1st

Finished as the champion
Finished as the 1st runner-up
Finished as the 2nd runner-up
Finished as the 3rd runner-up

=== Juniors basketball results ===
Juniors games between Lyceum and Mapúa have not been played under this label. Lyceum's high school teams are represented by its Cavite campus, while Mapúa is represented by the Malayan High School of Science, which is located in Pandacan, Manila

== See also ==
- Letran - San Beda rivalry
- San Sebastian–Letran rivalry
- Battle of the East
