= Ato Badolato =

Filipino basketball coach and league commissioner

Commissioner of the Philippine Secondary Schools Basketball Championship
- In office 2015–2021

Commissioner of the University Athletic Association of the Philippines Basketball
- In office 2012–2013
- Preceded by: Andy Jao
- Succeeded by: Chito Loyzaga
- In office 2010–2011
- Preceded by: Joe Lipa
- Succeeded by: Andy Jao

Personal details
- Born: Edmundo Badolato; December 30, 1946 Philippines
- Died: December 19, 2021 (aged 74)
- Occupation: Basketball coach and executive
- Basketball career

Career information
- College: San Beda

Career history

Coaching
- 1972–1980: San Beda HS (assistant)
- 1980–2009: San Beda HS
- 1989: Philippines (under-18)
- 1996: Philippines (under-18)
- 2001: San Beda

Career highlights
- As head coach: 13× NCAA Juniors champion (1981, 1982, 1987, 1988, 1991, 1992, 1995, 1996, 1999, 2002, 2003, 2004, 2009); As assistant coach: 2× NCAA Juniors champion (1974, 1978)

Edmundo "Ato" Badolato (December 30, 1946 – December 21, 2021) was a Filipino basketball coach and basketball executive.

== Career ==
=== Coaching ===
He led San Beda College (now San Beda University)'s high school team, the Red Cubs into multiple championships. Some of the PBA players played for him are Benjie Paras, Ronnie Magsanoc, Dindo Pumaren, as well as active players led by LA Tenorio, JVee Casio, and Baser Amer. He also served as head coach of the seniors team, the Red Lions, in 2001.

Badolato later served as athletic director of San Beda.

Badolato had also served head coach of the Philippines junior team in 1989, and in 1996.

=== Sports administration ===
He served twice as a UAAP Commissioner (2010 and 2012).

== Personal life ==
Badolato died on December 21, 2021, caused by heart attack.

== Legacy ==
The Maharlika Pilipinas Basketball League decided to name its coach of the year award after him.

== Coaching record ==
=== High school ===
Records since 1987:

Season	Team	Elimination round					Playoffs				
Season	Team	Finish	GP	W	L	PCT	GP	W	L	PCT	Results
1987	SBC	1st/6	10	9	1	.900	No playoffs				Champion
1988	SBC	1st/6	10	10	0	1.000	No playoffs				Champion
1989	SBC		10								
1990	SBC	2nd/6	10				No playoffs				Second place
1991	SBC		10				3	2	1	.667	Champion
1992	SBC		10				2	2	0	1.000	Champion
1993	SBC		10								
1994	SBC		10								
1995	SBC		10								Champion
1996	SBC	1st/7	12				No playoffs				Champion
1997	SBC	1st/7	12				3	1	2	.333	Lost Finals
1998	SBC		12								
1999	SBC	1st/8	12	14	0	1.000	2	1	1	.500	Champion
2000	SBC		14								
2001	SBC	2nd/8	14				4	2	2	.500	Lost Finals
2002	SBC	1st/8	14	14	0	1.000	2	1	1	.500	Champion
2003	SBC	1st/8	14	14	0	1.000	1	1	0	1.000	Champion
2004	SBC	1st/8	14				3	3	1	.750	Champion
2005	SBC	2nd/7	12	10	2	.833	3	1	2	.333	Lost Finals
2006	SBC	3rd/7	12	9	3	.750	1	0	1	.000	Lost semifinals
2007	SBC	3rd/6	10	6	4	.600	2	0	1	.500	Lost semifinals
2008	SBC	5th/7	12	5	7	.417	–	–	–	–	Eliminated
2009	SBC	1st/10	18	17	1	.944	4	3	1	.750	Champion

=== Collegiate ===
Season	Team	Elimination round					Playoffs				
Season	Team	Finish	GP	W	L	PCT	GP	W	L	PCT	Results
2001	SBC	8th/8	14	2	12	.143	–	–	–	—	Eliminated
Total			14	2	12	.143	0	0	0	—	0 championships

=== National team ===
Tournament	Team	Preliminary round					Final round				
Tournament	Team	Finish	GP	W	L	PCT	GP	W	L	PCT	Results
1989 ABC Under-18 Championship	Philippines	1st/4	3	3	0	1.000	5	3	2	.600	(bronze) Bronze medal
1996 SEABA Under-18 Championship	Philippines	1st/4	3	3	0	1.000	1	1	0	1.000	(gold) Gold medal
1996 ABC Under-18 Championship	Philippines	1st/4	3	3	0	1.000	4	1	3	.250	Sixth place
Total			9	9	0	1.000	10	5	5	.500	1 gold medal
