= Letran Knights basketball =

Letran Knights
2026 Letran Knights basketball team
- University: Colegio de San Juan de Letran
- Founded: 1917
- History: Letran Knights (1928–present)
- Head coach: Allen Ricardo (2nd season)
- Location: Intramuros, Manila
- Nickname: Knights
- Colors: Blue and Red

NCAA Champion (20)
- 1938; 1950; 1960; 1966; 1970; 1979; 1982; 1983; 1984; 1986; 1987; 1992; 1998; 1999; 2003; 2005; 2015; 2019; 2021; 2022

The Letran Knights basketball is the collegiate men’s basketball program of the Colegio de San Juan de Letran. The Knights have won 20 championships since joining the National Collegiate Athletic Association (NCAA). It is the second winningest team in the NCAA, just behind the San Beda Red Lions.

== History ==
=== Pre-war: first championship ===
The Letran basketball team found its humble beginnings in Liga Catolica until the 1920s. Letran then joined the NCAA in 1928. Letran College withdrew, however, in 1933, after a dispute over a decision of one of its team member during the Letran-Ateneo basketball game. Letran then later rejoined the league in 1936. Two years later, the Knights won their first senior basketball title under coach Jacinto Ciria Cruz and team captain Felicisimo Fajardo by beating San Beda, 42-30.

Letran Knights 1938–39 NCAA Men's Basketball Champions
Fely Fajardo · Angel de Leon · Guillermo Salvador · Feliciano Manlulu · Carlos Camillas · Jose Pacheco · Honesto Baltazar · Francisco Nepomuceno · Victorio Salazar · German Monzon · Guillermo Mendoza
Head coach: Jacinto Ciria Cruz

=== 1950–1980: after the war ===
The Knights emerged as the top team in 1950. Dubbed as the Letran Murder Inc., Letran could have won the NCAA title by a sweep, but it was beaten by underdog San Beda in the final game of the tournament. The team was coached by Angel de Leon and led by 1948 Olympian Lauro "The Fox" Mumar.

Letran Knights 1950–51 NCAA Men's Basketball Champions
Lauro Mumar · Nilo Verona · Luis Tabuena · Cesar de Sequera · Herminio Astorga · Jose Rubio Gutierrez · Jose Maria Iglesias · Ricardo Panis · Adriano Barata · Cristino Cui · Leodegario Pilones · Narciso Mañalac · Melquiades Manicsic · Senen Obiadas · Antonio Vidal
Head coach: Angel De Leon

During this period, the Knights made a habit of winning championships around the turn of every decade. In 1960 the team, which were led by Clemente Bargas, Augusto Cepeda, bigman William Jance, and rookies Freddie Webb and Basilio Go, faced the Jose Rizal Heavy Bombers in the championship round at the Araneta Coliseum. They finally clinched the championship, thanks to Basilio Go's game-winning jumper from the free throw area to win the game, 75-73, thus ending a ten-year title drought. The 1960 champion team was coached by Bibiano Ouano, former Ateneo Blue Eagle and member of the 1936 Summer Olympics men's basketball team. Later in 1966, the Knights, coached by Nilo Verona and were led by Larry Albano, Nemie Villegas, Augusto Fermin, and Eddie Reyes, beat the much taller Heavy Bombers for the championship. In the 1970 season, the Knights, led by Molet and Ricky Pineda, Rudy Hines and bigman Dave Regullano, beat the De La Salle Green Archers, for the championship.

In 1979, two sides from the Intramuros district of Manila, the oldest part of the city, battled one another in the championship round of the tournament. The so-called 'Battle of Intramuros' saw the Letran Knights and the Mapua Cardinals face off for the championship. Coached by the legendary Nemie Villegas, and led by Most Valuable Player (MVP) Ramon San Juan, shooting forward Angelito "Itoy" Esguerra, spitfire Pedrito "Bong" Aninon, Timoteo "Tim" Coloso, Nonito "Nonie" Robles, and team captain Ed Baldomero, the Knights defeated the Leo Isaac-led Cardinals to take home the school's 6th championship.

In 1980, hooliganism again marred the league. Fans of the Letran Knights, hoping for a back-to-back winning season, and the fans of the De La Salle Green Archers, got involved in a large brawl inside the Rizal Memorial Sports Complex. The BAP ordered the game to be re-played but the NCAA Policy Board decided to cancel the whole tournament. Letran was suspended from all events because of its participation in the brawl, and got reinstated in 1981.

Letran Knights 1960–61 NCAA Men's Basketball Champions
Clemente Bargas · Augusto Cepeda · William Jance · Basilio Go · Freddie Webb · Ramoncito Fernandez · Rolly Arzaga · Paco Del Rosario · Armando Campos · Severino Ong · Rolando Montelibano · Leopoldo Melo · Teodoro Lansang · Alfredo Van Short · Jaime Divinagracia
Head coach: Bing Ouano

Letran Knights 1966–67 NCAA Men's Basketball Champions
Joe Bolido · Romeo Bolido · Eddie Reyes · Fred Reyes · William Roco · Tony Roco · Boy Serrano · Tomasito Tolentino · Augusto Fermin · Nemie Villegas · Dick Marquez · Quelly Aro · Angel Manzano
Head coach: Nilo Verona

Letran Knights 1970–71 NCAA Men's Basketball Champions
Molet Pineda · Ricky Pineda · Rudy Hines · Dave Regullano · Tommy Gutierrez · Evangelio Peñalosa · Teddy Perez · Rino Salazar · Danny Marpal · Danny de Guzman · Nicolas Arceles · Amado Beltran · Bonifacio de Matta · Arsenio Reyes · Ezpedido Yummul
Head coach: Gabby Fajardo

Letran Knights 1979–80 NCAA Men's Basketball Champions
Eddie Baldomero · Pedrito Aniñon · Arnulfo Robles · Ramon San Juan · Bobby Valenzuela · Tim Coloso · Ramon Navales · Ted McKinney · Itoy Esguerra · William Alberto · Tony de Leon · Chito Mojica · Ed Ducut · Vicente Gavieres · Boyet Olaño
Head coach: Nemie Villegas

=== Early 80s: Samboy Lim era and the first three-peat ===
The Letran Knights started the 1982 season under the tutelage of new coach Larry Albano which featured a very exciting player named Avelino "Samboy" Lim, a product of San Beda's high school program. After sweeping the first round, the Knights continued to pile up victories in the second round and was two wins ahead of second-ranked San Sebastian Stags. The Knights were unofficially crowned champions but they still had to play Trinity College in a no-bearing game to officially finish their NCAA campaign. The Knights lost that game 102-89 but it didn't matter as the school's 7th title was still presented to them.

In 1983, Samboy Lim and the Knights advanced to the championship round where they will meet Nani Demegillo and the San Sebastian Stags for the title. The championship game was decided on a best-of-3 series and both teams split the first two games but in Game 3 the Knights played inspired basketball thanks to Samboy Lim's heroic deed of choosing to play instead of resting in his hospital bed due to an asthma attack prior to the game, and captured their second straight championship. Romy Ang was named MVP of the season. With San Beda taking a leave of absence in 1984, the NCAA kicked off the season with only five schools participating and the Knights become the first school to finish the season undefeated and champions. Samboy Lim was named MVP of the season.

Letran Knights 1982–83 NCAA Men's Basketball Champions
Bobby Agner · Monty Aquino · Jerry Gonzales · Tonichi Pujante · Jojo Cuizon · Elmer Latonio · Romeo Ang · Cayetano Salazar · Marciano Avila, Jr. · Antonio Cabatana · Tino Pinat · Salvador Ramos · Ermar Bolabola · Victor Bonot · Samboy Lim
Head coach: Larry Albano

Letran Knights 1983–84 NCAA Men's Basketball Champions
Monty Aquino · Jerry Gonzales · Tonichi Pujante · Jojo Cuizon · Elmer Latonio · Romeo Ang · Cayetano Salazar · Marciano Avila, Jr. · Antonio Cabatana · Tino Pinat · Salvador Ramos · Ermar Bolabola · Victor Bonot · Samboy Lim
Head coach: Larry Albano

Letran Knights 1984–85 NCAA Men's Basketball Champions
Monty Aquino · Jerry Gonzales · Tonichi Pujante · Dong Polistico · Fernando Libed · Romeo Ang · Cayetano Salazar · Fortunato Cortez · Antonio Cabatana · Tino Pinat · Salvador Ramos · Ermar Bolabola · Victor Bonot · Samboy Lim
Head coach: Larry Albano

=== Late 80s: second back-to-back ===
In 1985, hopes for a rare four-peat vanished as the Knights succumbed to the Stags in the Finals as they lost five of its key players, notable of which was Samboy Lim.

In 1986, Letran won the 2nd round eliminations to arrange a championship match again with the defending champions San Sebastian, led by "Mr. Excitement" Paul Alvarez, for the third time in five years. The Knights were coached by Eddie Reyes and bannered by Fernando "Dong" Libed, Arthur Ayson, Cayetano Salazar, Jing Ruiz, Robert Ruiz, and Justino Pinat. Letran won the series in three games.

In 1987, the Letran Knights swept the 2nd round eliminations to secure a spot again in the Finals to face their rivals San Sebastian Stags in a best-of-three series. The Stags won Game 1 via Eugene Quilban and Napoleon Hatton's heroics. In Game 2, Letran found an unlikely hero in rookie Erwin Santos to secure the win. Letran finally won the series in three games, 63-62, highlighted by a game-winning fadeaway jumper by Dong Libed at the buzzer, making the whole Letran gallery erupted in jubilation and spilled the court.

Letran Knights 1986–87 NCAA Men's Basketball Champions
Monty Aquino · Arthur Ayson · Marlon Bolabola · Ronnie Co · Alberto David · Eric Enad · Fernando Libed · Tino Pinat · Jerry Ruiz · Robert Ruiz · Cayetano Salazar
Head coach: Eddie Reyes

Letran Knights 1987–88 NCAA Men's Basketball Champions
Arthur Ayson · Marlon Bolabola · Edison Cubacub · Alberto David · Eric Enad · Fernando Libed · William Johnson · Tino Pinat · Jerry Ruiz · Robert Ruiz · Erwin Santos
Head coach: Eddie Reyes

=== The 1990s: three more titles ===
In 1992, Letran won the 2nd round of the eliminations and the right to face the 1st round winners San Sebastian Stags in a best-of-three Finals. Led by season MVP Ronald "Joy" Peña, Scoring Champion Carlito Espiritu, Gilbert Castillo, and Wilmon Yu, the Knights defeated the Stags in three games. A power outage hit the area with 42 seconds left and Letran students and supporters poured onto the court for an early celebration while waiting for the lights to be restored.

Letran Knights 1992–93 NCAA Men's Basketball Champions
Francis Arabit · Joven Banez · Eric Castillo · Gilbert Castillo · Carlito Espiritu · Gian Paolo Evidente · Paul Guerrero · Jovito Macatugal · Dennis Marcelo · James Milan · Ronald Peña · Efrain Soto · Wilmon Yu
Head coach: Rudy Hines

In 1997, the team, bannered by Willie Miller and then-rookie Kerby Raymundo, went on to the Final Four. They beat Mapua in the first round of the step-ladder, but got eliminated by San Beda in the 2nd round.

In 1998, the Knights, led by Kerby Raymundo and season MVP Chris Calaguio, and now coached by Louie Alas, faced the sixth-peat seeking Stags in the Finals. Letran won the series via Nicholas Pacheco's game-winning three point shot to capture their 13th championship. Louie Alas then left the team to coach the Philippines men's national basketball team in the 1999 SEA Games in Brunei.

During the 1999 season, the Letran Knights were mentored by Binky Favis. History was made when the Letran Knights became the first team ranked fourth to beat a number one ranked team, the San Sebastian Stags, in the semi-finals that year. The Letran Knights went to the best-of-three Finals to face the JRC Heavy Bombers, led by Ernani Epondulan and Ariel Capus. Letran won Game 1 via Aldin Ayo's late-game layup. During the 2nd game with only 3 minutes remaining, Letran's John Paul Prior and JRC's John Dale Valena got into a fistfight on the court, causing the crowd from both sides to throw all sorts of debris onto the playing court thus delaying the game, and later triggering a brawl that reached outside the ULTRA stadium. JRC officials then decided to concede the game with Letran leading 83-60, thus gave the championship to the Knights. Kerby Raymundo was named season and Finals MVP.

Letran Knights 1998–99 NCAA Men's Basketball Champions
William Moody · Marlon Bernal · Jason Misolas · Kerby Raymundo · Erwin Velez · Aldin Ayo · Edgar Lee · Orlan Tama · Allan Salangsang · Marcelino Soriano · Anthony Lim · Jose Nicholas Pacheco · Chris Calaguio · Paul Moreno · John Paul Prior
Head coach: Louie Alas

Letran Knights 1999–2000 NCAA Men's Basketball Champions
William Moody · Jason Misolas · Kerby Raymundo · Aldin Ayo · Edgar Lee · Orlan Tama · Allan Salangsang · Marco Garcia · Anthony Lim · Jose Nicholas Pacheco · Richard Gutierrez · Paul Moreno · John Paul Prior · Kristoffer Reyes
Head coach: Binky Favis

=== 2000s: return of Louie Alas ===
From the 2000 to 2002 seasons, the Letran Knights struggled as they underwent a rebuilding process. In 2002, former mentor Louie Alas came back as the head coach of the Knights after his stints in Manila Metrostars in the MBA, and the Mobiline Phone Pals in the PBA.

The 2003 series culminated with a play-off between the Letran Knights and the hosts, the San Sebastian Stags, who had won the previous two championships. The Knights, led by Ronjay Enrile, were aiming to break Ateneo de Manila University's record of 14 titles. The series reached a deciding third game. In the final minutes, Boyet Bautista, Aaron Aban and Jonathan Piñera ignited an 8–0 run, turning a 56–58 deficit into a 64–58 title-clinching victory. Ronjay Enrile was voted as NCAA Finals MVP.

Letran Knights 2003–04 NCAA Men's Basketball Champions
Chris Caindoy · Dale Santos · Anthony Fedelicio · Mark Balneg · Boyet Bautista · Ronjay Enrile · Eric Rodriguez · Jonathan Pinera · Jonathan Aldave · Kristoffer Reyes · John Realista · Billy Ray Anabo · Andro Quinday · Aaron Aban · Norman Ebajay
Head coach: Louie Alas

Emerging at the end of the elimination round during the 2004 season with a 9–5 standing, the Letran Knights faced, in the Final Four tournament, a Philippine Christian University Dolphins bannered by Jayson Castro, Gabby Espinas, Beau Belga, and Rob Sanz, who had a 10–4 standing and a twice-to-beat advantage. The match was forced to a deciding game, but Aban and Enrile both split their free throws in the 4th quarter and the game went into overtime. The Dolphins went on to win their first NCAA title against the season host, UPHSD Altas.

In the 2005 season, the Knights and the defending champions Dolphins faced each other again in the playoffs, this time in the best-of-three Finals series. The Dolphins shocked the Knights as they emerged as winners in Game 1. The Knights, however, won Game 2 to force a deciding game led by John Paul Alcaraz. The deciding game was won by the Knights, with Boyet Bautista winning Finals MVP honors. Louie Alas won his third NCAA title and was awarded Coach of the Year.

Letran Knights 2005–06 NCAA Men's Basketball Champions
JP Alcaraz · Bryan Faundo · Mark Andaya · Mark Balneg · Carl Melegrito · Eric Rodriguez · Jonathan Pinera · Jonathan Aldave · Hafer Mondragon · John Realista · Billy Ray Anabo · Andro Quinday · Aaron Aban · RJ Jazul
Head coach: Louie Alas

In the 2006 season, the Knights had a 6-0 start but were beaten by San Beda in the first round finale. The Knights won several more games, but with losses to eventual semifinalists Mapua, PCU, and San Beda in their last three elimination round games, they were forced to face-off with PCU. The Knights lost this game and went on to lose another in the final four, finishing second runner-up. Letran Knight Boyet Bautista won the Most Improved Player award.

Louie Alas described the 2007 season as a "rebuilding" season, with Boyet Bautista and Aaron Aban leaving the team after being drafted into the Philippine Basketball Association. The Philippine Christian University Dolphins were suspended, leaving only 7 teams in the competition. The Letran Knights won their first four games before losing to the hosts, the JRU Heavy Bombers. They went on to defeat the San Beda Red Lions, who until then had been unbeaten, and so finished on top after the first round. The team was beaten by Mapua and San Beda in the second round, but still finished second. They defeated the Heavy Bombers in the semifinals but lost to San Beda Red Lions in the Finals.

In 2008 season, Letran won the first six games of the season, including a come-from-behind win against UPHSD, but faltered in the first round finale against San Beda. In the elimination round finale, Letran was on the verge of winning a twice-to-beat advantage but a game went into overtime. In the extra period, Letran was leading by 4 points when San Beda rallied to lead by two. RJ Jazul scored on a driving lay-up with 5 seconds remaining but Borgie Hermida scored a buzzer-beater with a looper from the free-throw line to seal San Beda's third straight semifinal appearance with the twice to beat advantage. After San Beda's win against Letran, four teams, including the Knights, were tied from 2nd to 5th, with only 4 teams advancing to the semifinals. Letran defeated Mapua, 62-52, in the classification round and managed to qualify for the second-seed playoff game against JRU. But JRU defeated Letran and the former clinched the second-seed and twice-to-beat advantage. The two teams meet again in the semi-finals, but still Letran lost.

In 2009, the Knights were still led by RJ Jazul and Rey Guevarra, who were on their final year of eligibility. Joining them was the former Letran Squire star, Kevin Alas. On their last elimination game, San Beda had an easy win against Letran, but not before Rey Guevarra was injured after a bad fall in a collision with San Beda's Sudan Daniel. Guevarra would be ruled out for the rest of the season with an anterior cruciate ligament (ACL) injury. Letran garnered a fourth-place finish and allowing themselves to qualify in the Final four where they faced, and still lost, to San Beda.

=== 2010–2012: rebuilding and end of Louie Alas era ===
In 2010, the Knights failed to advance to the Final 4 for the second time in the Louie Alas era but 2 weeks after the tournament they started their preparation for Season 87.

In 2011 the team was joined by Kevin Racal, JRU transferees Joel Gabriel and Carlo Lituania, and spitfire point guard Mark Cruz and Zyron Cudal from the Letran Squires program. From 5th place the previous year, the Knights cruised to the Final 4 as the #3 seed and faced the #2 seed San Sebastian Stags. They beat the Stags in the first game to force a do-or-die game but eventually lost in the second game. Kevin Alas and Raymond Almazan were named to the Mythical 5 and Almazan also bagged the Defensive Player of the Year award.

The 2012 season was a roller coaster ride for the Knights as they start the season sinking down as far as the 6th spot and it didn't stop there as star center Raymond Almazan was missing a lot of games in the first round for unknown reasons. Almazan vowed to come back in the 2nd round and with him back in the lineup, the Knights became the hottest team in the NCAA as they won 7 of their 9 games just enough to secure the #3 spot to force a Final 4 rematch against San Sebastian. In the first game Kevin Alas made history as he scored 43 points, breaking former CSB Blazers star Sunday Salvacion's previous record of 39 points in 2001, to force a knockout game. In the do-or-die game, the game went down to the wire but Jojo Belorio made sure it will be Letran this time by scoring the game winning free throws to book the last ticket to the Finals. They met San Beda in the finals. They were lost in the first game, but avoided defeat in the second game. In Game 3 they were blown out by the Red Lions. A month later after the tournament, longtime head coach Louie Alas resigned.

=== 2013–2019: coaching changes and back to championship form ===
In 2013, Letran hired then-Rain or Shine Elasto Painters assistant coach Caloy Garcia as their new head coach, replacing long-time mentor Louie Alas. Joining the team are UPHSD transferee Franz Dysam and former NCAA Season 87 juniors MVP Rey Nambatac from their juniors program. Letran went again to the finals but still lost to San Beda in three games. Raymond Almazan was named season MVP and Defensive Player of the Year.

In 2014, the team added former Letran squire and NCAA Season 88 juniors MVP John Quinto. With the departure of Raymond Almazan to the pros, the Knights struggled to enter the Final Four with a 9-9 record. After the tournament, Caloy Garcia parted ways with the Knights. Letran officials then named former Letran Knights player Aldin Ayo as the new head coach.

In 2015, Letran officials named Filipino boxing icon Manny Pacquiao as their new team manager. The Knights finally ended its ten-year title drought as they captured their 17th NCAA men's basketball championship by beating San Beda in three games. Mark Cruz was named NCAA Finals MVP. Just weeks after leading the Knights to a championship, Aldin Ayo left Letran to coach the De La Salle Green Archers in the UAAP citing personal reasons.

Letran Knights 2015–16 NCAA Men's Basketball Champions
Felix Apreku · Jom Sollano · Rey Nambatac · Jerrick Balanza · JP Calvo · Mark Cruz · McJour Luib · Maui Bernabe · Chris Dela Peña · Tommy Gedaria · Christian Balagasay · Kevin Racal · Kevin Buenaflor · Rey Publico · Bong Quinto
Head coach: Aldin Ayo

The following year, Letran officials formally named then-NU Bullpups coach Jeff Napa as the new head coach of the Knights. However they struggled to enter the Final Four for two seasons.

In 2018, SMC Sports director Alfrancis Chua was named as the Knights' Special Assistant to the Rector for Sports Development. The Knights also added transferees Fran Yu and Edson Batiller from UE, and Larry Muyang from La Salle. They finally barged into the Final Four, but they were eliminated by Lyceum. John Quinto was named as one of the Mythical Five, while Larry Muyang bags Rookie of the Year award.

In 2019, coach Jeff Napa formally part ways with Letran after his three-year contract. A month later, former longtime Lyceum Pirates head coach and then-NorthPort Batang Pier team manager Bonnie Tan formally announced as the new head coach of the Knights. After the elimination rounds, Letran finished third place, thus securing a spot in the Final Four. Letran then eliminated San Sebastian and Lyceum via the step-ladder format and entered the Finals, where they faced the unbeaten and defending champion San Beda and defeat them in three games to capture their 18th NCAA championship. Fran Yu was named NCAA Finals MVP and Most Improved Player. After the team's bonfire celebration, Jeff Napa returned to Letran as a team consultant.

=== 2020–2022: COVID-19 pandemic and second three-peat ===
The whole NCAA league suffered a setback when the Philippines was hit by the COVID-19 pandemic in 2020, thus suspending the 95th season to an indefinite halt. In that year, UST Growling Tigers players Rhenz Abando, Brent Paraiso, and Ira Bataller formally transferred to Letran. When the NCAA men's basketball finally resumed in the second semester of the academic year 2021-22, the Knights finished the elimination round at first place with an unblemished record. Letran then eliminated UPHSD and entered the Finals and faced their Intramuros neighbors the Mapúa Cardinals and defeat them in two games to successfully defend and capture their 19th basketball title. Team captain Jeo Ambohot was named NCAA Finals MVP, NCAA All-Defensive Team, and a Mythical Five member, while Rhenz Abando became the 11th Letran Knight to capture the Season MVP award. Abando also bagged the Rookie of the Year award and was also named in the Mythical Five.

After leading the Knights to the NCAA Season 97 title, Rhenz Abando decided to forego his final playing year to pursue his basketball career as a professional player. Abando then signed with the Anyang KGC of the Korean Basketball League. Even without the presence of their MVP, the Knights, still bannered by team captain Fran Yu, Louie Sangalang, and Brent Paraiso, successfully defended and captured its 20th NCAA basketball championship, and their third consecutive title, by beating the number one seeded Benilde Blazers in three games. King Caralipio was named the Finals MVP and also named in the Mythical Five.

Letran Knights 2019–20 NCAA Men's Basketball Champions
Jeo Ambohot · Christian Balagasay · Jerrick Balanza · Edson Batiller · King Caralipio · Neil Guarino · Paolo Javillonar · Allen Mina · Tommy Olivario · Larry Muyang · Jap Pambid · Kurt Reyson · Louie Sangalang · Renato Ular · Fran Yu · Richie Alferez · Shamasneh Bañez · Lance Vacaro
Head coach: Bonnie Tan

Letran Knights 2021–22 NCAA Men's Basketball Champions
Jeo Ambohot · Rhenz Abando · Kint Ariar · Christian Fajarito · King Caralipio · Neil Guarino · Paolo Javillonar · Allen Mina · Tommy Olivario · Jimly Lantaya · Brent Paraiso · Kurt Reyson · Louie Sangalang · Kyle Tolentino · Fran Yu · Rafael Go · Shamasneh Bañez · Jeffy Mailim
Head coach: Bonnie Tan

Letran Knights 2022–23 NCAA Men's Basketball Champions
Rafael Go · Kint Ariar · Joshua Miclat · King Caralipio · Neil Guarino · Paolo Javillonar · Kobe Monje · Tommy Olivario · Jimly Lantaya · Brent Paraiso · Kurt Reyson · Louie Sangalang · Kyle Tolentino · Fran Yu · Kevin Santos · Steven Angeles · Joco Bojorcelo · Justine Bautista
Head coach: Bonnie Tan

=== 2023–present: Under new management ===
In March 2023, Letran has reach an agreement with Bacoor mayor and Letran alumnus Strike Revilla as its main backer of the Knights. A month later, multi-titled mentor Bonnie Tan stepped down as head coach of the Knights to focus on his duties as the main tactician of the NorthPort Batang Pier in the PBA. He was replaced by his deputy, Rensy Bajar. Bajar then signed a two-year contract as the new head coach for the Knights.

After the Knights finished 9th place last Season 99, Letran officials then named Allen Ricardo from the high school program and back-to-back champions Letran Squires as the new interim head coach for the Knights. Later on, Ricardo was officially named the new head coach of the Knights, while former Letran star Willie Miller will replace him as the head coach of the Squires program.

== Current roster ==
NCAA Season 102

Letran Knights roster
Players
Coaches

Pos.	No.	Nat.	Name	Height	Year	High School
G	12	(Philippines)	Borrero, Mark	5'11" (1.8m)	1	De La Salle Santiago Zobel School
SG	10	(Philippines)	Villanueva, Alvin Rex	5'10" (1.78m)	1	Colegio de San Juan de Letran
F	14	(Philippines)	Buensalida, Aaron James	6'5" (1.96m)	2	Nazareth School-NU
G	9	(Philippines)	Cargo, Justin Rafael	6'0" (1.83m)	1	Colegio de San Juan de Letran
F	24	(Philippines)	Diamante, George T.	6'4" (1.93m)	1	Colegio de San Juan de Letran
G	22	(Philippines)	Dy, Chris John	5'11" (1.8m)	1	Arellano University
G	26	(Philippines)	Estrada, John Sherick	6'0" (1.83m)	3	St. Clare College Caloocan
G	3	(Canada)	Gammad, Lorge Reinier B.	6'0" (1.83m)	2	A.R. MacNeill Secondary School
F	27	(Philippines)	Hugo, Justine Shane	6'2" (1.88m)	1	Colegio de San Juan de Letran
PG	13	(Philippines)	Manalili, Jonathan Moses	6'0" (1.83m)	2	Colegio de San Juan de Letran
PG	7	(Philippines)	Montecillo, Nathaniel	5'9" (1.75m)	3	UP Integrated School
G	18	(Philippines)	Muyuela, Ranz Ezekiel	5'11" (1.8m)	1	La Salle Green Hills
G	31	(Philippines)	Reyes, Froilan Jr.	6'0" (1.83m)	1	Mapúa University
C	4	(Philippines)	Santos, Kevin Kyle (C)	6'6" (1.98m)	5	St. Augustine Institute of Pampanga
G	16	(Philippines)	Siena, Lance Daniel L.	6'3" (1.91m)	1	La Consolacion College Manila
G	17	(Philippines)	Valdeavilla, Don Daryl	6'2" (1.88m)	1	UP Integrated School
G	5	(United States)	Walker, Denzil Dominick S.	6'4" (1.93m)	1	Camden High School Minneapolis

Head coach

- Joseph Allen Ricardo

Assistant coach(es)

- Kristoffer Reyes (First Assistant)
- Michael Gregg Buendia
- John Carl Melegrito
- Bong Solian
- Mac Villarba

Strength & conditioning coach(es)

- Brian Cay
- Daryl Diaz (assistant)

Team Staff

- Mark Anthony Guiao

Team manager

- John Paul Beltrano
- Seth Jarell Diamse (assistant)
- Joshua Railey Motio (assistant)

Legend

- (C) Team captain
- Injured

- Roster
Updated: 2026-09-18

== Season-by-season records ==
Champion	Runner-up	Third place

=== Pre-Final Four era ===
Year	Elimination round				Playoffs result	Coach
Year	Finish	GP	W	L	Playoffs result	Coach
1930	3rd/4	3	1	2	Lost playoff vs. UP, 26–35	
1938					Won Finals vs San Beda, 42–30	Jacinto Ciria Cruz
1950	1st/6	10	9	1	Won both pennants, automatically won title	Angel de Leon
1959	5th/5	10	0	10		
1960					Won Finals vs JRC, 75–73	Bibiano Ouano
1966					Won Finals vs JRC	Nilo Verona
1970					Won vs La Salle, 94-82	Gabby Fajardo
1975					Runner-up to Ateneo	Freddie Webb
1979					Won both pennants, automatically won title	Nemie Villegas
1982	1st/6	10	8	2	Won both pennants, automatically won title	Larry Albano
1983					Won Finals (San Sebastian 2–1)	Larry Albano
1984	1st/5	8	8	0	Won both pennants, automatically won title	Larry Albano
1985					Lost to San Sebastian in Finals	Larry Albano
1986	1st/6	10	7	3	Won Finals (San Sebastian 2–1)	Eddie Reyes
1987	1st/6	10	9	1	Won Finals (San Sebastian 2–1)	Eddie Reyes
1988	3rd/6	10	5	5		Eddie Reyes
1989	3rd/6	10	6	4		Eddie Reyes
1990	3rd/6	10	6	4		Eddie Reyes
1991	5th/6	10	3	7		Rudy Hines
1992	2nd/6	10	7	3	Won Finals (San Sebastian 2–0)	Rudy Hines
1993	2nd/6	10			Lost to San Sebastian in Finals	Rudy Hines
1996	3rd/7	12	9	3		Molet Pineda

=== Final Four era ===
Season	Elimination round					Playoffs	Awards	Head coach
Season	Finish	GP	W	L	PCT	Playoffs	Awards	Head coach
1997	T–3rd/7	12	7	5	.583	Won Stepladder Round 1 (Mapua 68-57); Lost Stepladder Round 2 (San Beda 65-72)	Kerby Raymundo (Rookie of the Year)	Molet Pineda
1998	1st/8	14	12	2	.857	Won semifinals (San Beda); Won Finals (San Sebastian 2-0)	Chris Calaguio (Season MVP, Mythical Five); Kerby Raymundo (Mythical Five, Most Improved Player)	Louie Alas
1999	4th/8	14	9	5	.643	Won semifinals (San Sebastian 2-0); Won Finals (JRC 2-0)	Kerby Raymundo (Season MVP, Finals MVP, Defensive Player of the Year, Mythical Five); Orlan Tama (Most Improved Player)	Binky Favis
2000	7th/8	14	4	10	.286	—	Orlan Tama (Mythical Five)	Binky Favis
2001	6th/8	14	6	8	.429	—	Harold Santa Cruz (Mythical Five); Ismael Junio (Rookie of the Year)	Binky Favis
2002	6th/8	14	7	7	.500	—		Louie Alas
2003	1st/8	14	9	5	.643	Won semifinals (Mapua 72-66); Won Finals (San Sebastian 2-1)	Ronjay Enrile (Finals MVP, Mythical Five)	Louie Alas
2004	3rd/8	14	9	5	.643	Lost semifinals (PCU 65-64, 80-85 (OT))		Louie Alas
2005	1st/8	14	13	1	.929	Won semifinals (San Sebastian 93-60); Won Finals (PCU 2-1)	Boyet Bautista (Finals MVP); Aaron Aban (Most Improved Player)	Louie Alas
2006	T-2nd/8	14	10	4	.714	Lost 2nd-seed playoff (PCU 62-67); Lost semifinals (PCU 50-72)	Boyet Bautista (Most Improved Player)	Louie Alas
2007	2nd/7	12	9	3	.750	Won semifinals (JRU 70-61); Lost Finals (San Beda 0-2)	Bryan Faundo (Mythical Five); Dino Daa (Mythical Five)	Louie Alas
2008	T-2nd/8	14	9	5	.643	Won 2nd/4th-seed playoff (Mapua 62-52); Lost 2nd-seed playoff (JRU 53-69); Lost semifinals (JRU 61-63)	RJ Jazul (Mythical Five)	Louie Alas
2009	4th/10	18	12	6	.667	Lost semifinals (San Beda 76-82)	RJ Jazul (Mythical Five)	Louie Alas
2010	5th/9	16	7	9	.438	—		Louie Alas
2011	3rd/10	18	14	4	.778	Lost semifinals (San Sebastian 70-62, 56-63)	Raymond Almazan (Mythical Five); Kevin Alas (Mythical Five)	Louie Alas
2012	3rd/10	18	12	6	.667	Won semifinals (San Sebastian 90-74, 73-70); Lost Finals (San Beda 1-2)	Kevin Alas (Mythical Five); Raymond Almazan (Defensive Player of the Year)	Louie Alas
2013	2nd/10	18	14	4	.778	Won semifinals (San Sebastian 85-58); Lost Finals (San Beda 1-2)	Raymond Almazan (Season MVP, Defensive Player of the Year, Mythical Five)	Caloy Garcia
2014	6th/10	18	9	9	.500	—		Caloy Garcia
2015	T-1st/10	18	13	5	.722	Lost 1st-seed playoff (San Beda 78-83); Won semifinals (Mapua 91-90); Won Finals (San Beda 2-1)	Mark Cruz (Finals MVP)	Aldin Ayo
2016	6th/10	18	9	9	.500	—		Jeff Napa
2017	T-4th/10	18	9	9	.500	Won 4th/5th-seed playoff (Arellano 70-68); Lost 4th-seed playoff (San Sebastian 69-74)		Jeff Napa
2018	3rd/10	18	13	5	.722	Lost semifinals (Lyceum 85-109)	Larry Muyang (Rookie of the Year)	Jeff Napa
2019	3rd/10	18	12	6	.667	Won Stepladder Round 1 (San Sebastian 85-80); Won Stepladder Round 2 (Lyceum 92-88); Won Finals (San Beda 2-1)	Fran Yu (Finals MVP, Most Improved Player)	Bonnie Tan
2020	Cancelled due to the COVID-19 pandemic							Bonnie Tan
2021 (Note: 2021-22 season was played in early 2022.)	1st/10	9	9	0	1.000	Won semifinals (Perpetual 77-75); Won Finals (Mapua 2-0)	Jeo Ambohot (Finals MVP, Mythical Five, All Defensive Team); Rhenz Abando (Season MVP, Mythical Five, Rookie of the Year)	Bonnie Tan
2022	2nd/10	18	13	5	.722	Won semifinals (Lyceum 67-58); Won Finals (Benilde 2-1)	King Caralipio (Finals MVP, Mythical Five)	Bonnie Tan
2023	9th/10	18	2	16	.111	—	Jay Garupil (Freshman of the Year)	Rensy Bajar
2024	6th/10	18	8	10	.444	—	Kevin Santos (All-Defensive Team)	Allen Ricardo
Eliminations		423	260	163	.615	18 Final Four appearances		
Postseason		52	30	22	.577	11 Finals appearances		
Overall record		475	290	185	.611	8 championships		

=== Play-in era ===
Season	Group stage					Playoffs	Awards	Head coach
Season	Finish	GP	W	L	PCT	Playoffs	Awards	Head coach
2025	3rd/5	13	8	5	.615	Won quarterfinals (Arellano 87-78, 77-69); Won semifinals (Perpetual 2-0); Lost Finals (San Beda 0-2)	Jonathan Manalili (Freshman of the Year, Rookie of the Year, Mythical Five); Kevin Santos (All-Defensive Team, Mythical Five)	Allen Ricardo
2026	—	—	—	—	—	—	—	Allen Ricardo
Preliminary		13	8	5	.615	1 Quarterfinals appearance	1 Final Four appearance	
Postseason		6	4	2	.667	1 Finals appearance		
Overall record		19	12	7	.632	0 championships		

== Notable players ==
=== NCAA individual awards ===
Most Valuable Player
- Lauro Mumar - 1950
- Alex Marquez - 1975
- Ramon San Juan - 1979
- Jerry Gonzales - 1982
- Romeo Ang - 1983
- Samboy Lim - 1984
- Ronald Peña - 1992
- Chris Calaguio - 1998
- Kerby Raymundo - 1999
- Raymond Almazan - 2013
- Rhenz Abando - 2021

Finals MVP

- Gilbert Castillo - 1992
- Jose Nicholas Pacheco - 1998
- Kerby Raymundo - 1999
- Ronjay Enrile - 2003
- Boyet Bautista - 2005
- Mark Cruz - 2015
- Fran Yu - 2019
- Jeo Ambohot - 2021
- King Caralipio - 2022

Rookie of the Year

- Willie Miller - 1996
- Kerby Raymundo - 1997
- Ismael Junio - 2001
- Larry Muyang - 2018
- Rhenz Abando - 2021
- Jonathan Manalili - 2025

Mythical Five

- Chris Calaguio - 1998
- Kerby Raymundo - 1998, 1999
- Orlan Tama - 2000
- Harold Santa Cruz - 2001
- Ronjay Enrile - 2003
- Bryan Faundo - 2007
- Dino Daa - 2007
- Kevin Alas - 2011, 2012
- Raymond Almazan - 2011, 2013
- Rhenz Abando - 2021
- Jeo Ambohot - 2021
- King Caralipio - 2022
- Jonathan Manalili - 2025
- Kevin Santos - 2025

=== Knights in the Pros ===
Bold denotes active player. (Note: A player is considered inactive if he has announced his retirement or not played for a full season.)

==== Philippine Basketball Association ====
- Samboy Lim (San Miguel)
- Cayetano Salazar (Ginebra)
- Rino Salazar (Toyota)
- Itoy Esguerra (Crispa)
- Rudy Hines (U-Tex)
- Romeo Valenzuela (St. George Whiskies / Gilbey's Gin)
- Molet Pineda (U-Tex)
- Art Ayson (Purefoods)
- Tim Coloso (Toyota)
- Estelito Espiritu (Shell)
- Jing Ruiz (Shell)
- Freddie Webb (YCO Tanduay)
- Romy Marcelo (Toyota)
- Anton Villoria (Red Bull)
- Paul Guerrero (Purefoods)
- Dong Polistco (San Miguel / Alaska)
- Ed Ducut (Ginebra)
- Romy Ang (Presto / Shell)
- Gilbert Castillo (San Miguel/Purefoods / Red Bull)
- Billy Moody (San Miguel)
- Chris Calaguio (Shell / San Miguel)
- Willie Miller (Alaska / Red Bull / Ginebra / TNT / GlobalPort / Barako Bull)
- Kerby Raymundo (Red Bull / Purefoods / Ginebra)
- Eric Rodriguez (Air21 / Brgy. Ginebra)
- Allan Salangsang (TNT / Ginebra / Coca-Cola / Rain or Shine)
- Aaron Aban (Alaska / Purefoods / Burger King / TNT / GlobalPort)
- Mark Andaya (TNT / Red Bull / Rain or Shine / Air21)
- Christian Balagasay (NorthPort / Terrafirma)
- Bonbon Batiller (Terrafirma)
- Boyet Bautista (Purefoods)
- JP Calvo (Terrafirma)
- Mark Cruz (Purefoods / Blackwater)
- Bryan Faundo (Barako Bull / Meralco / Air21 / Petron / GlobalPort / Brgy. Ginebra / Blackwater / Phoenix / Alaska)
- Rey Guevarra (Petron / Powerade / Meralco / Barako Bull / Phoenix)
- Allen Mina (Terrafirma)
- **Kevin Alas (TNT / NLEX)**
- **Raymond Almazan (Rain or Shine / Meralco)**
- **Jerrick Balanza (Ginebra / NorthPort / Converge / Magnolia)**
- **RJ Jazul (Rain or Shine / Alaska /Phoenix)**
- **Rey Nambatac (Rain or Shine / Blackwater / TNT)**
- **Kevin Racal (Alaska / Converge)**
- **Jeo Ambohot (Converge)**
- **King Caralipio (Converge)**
- **Larry Muyang (Phoenix)**
- **Tommy Olivario (Terrafirma)**
- **Brent Paraiso (Terrafirma)**
- **Rey Publico (Blackwater)**
- **Bong Quinto (Meralco)**
- **Louie Sangalang (Terrafirma)**
- **Ato Ular (Blackwater / NLEX /Phoenix)**
- **Fran Yu (NorthPort)**

==== Maharlika Pilipinas Basketball League ====
- **Felix Apreku (South Cotabato Warriors)**
- **Mark Cruz (South Cotabato Warriors)**
- **Christian Fajarito (South Cotabato Warriors)**
- **Kurt Reyson (Pampanga Giant Lanterns)**
- **Kyle Tolentino (South Cotabato Warriors)**
- Jaypee Belencion (GenSan OKBet Warriors)
- Bryan Faundo (Imus SV Squad)

==== ASEAN Basketball League ====
- Mark Andaya (Philippine Patriots)
- Eric Rodriguez (AirAsia Philippine Patriots)
- Allan Salangsang (AirAsia Philippine Patriots)
- Aaron Aban (San Miguel Alab Pilipinas)
- **Joshua De Villa (Hong Kong Eastern Long Lions)**

==== Korean Basketball League ====
- **Rhenz Abando (Anyang Jung Kwan Jang Red Boosters)**

=== Knights in the national team ===
- Lauro Mumar – 1948 Olympian, 1951 Asian Games gold medalist, 1954 FIBA World Championship bronze medalist, 1954 Asian Games gold medalist
- Felicisimo Fajardo – 1948 Olympian
- Florentino Bautista – 1952 Olympian
- Freddie Webb – 1972 Olympian
- David Regullano – 1973 ABC Championship gold medalist
- Nathaniel Castillo - Philippine team member 1978 FIBA World Championship
- Greg Gozum - Philippine team member 1978 FIBA World Championship
- Samboy Lim – 1985 William Jones Cup gold medalist, 1986 Asian Games Bronze medalist, 1990 Asian Games Silver medalist and Mythical Five selection
- Robert Ruiz – 1988 RP Youth
- Kerby Raymundo – 1999 SEA Games gold medalist, Philippine team member 2007 FIBA Asia Championship and 2009 FIBA Asia Championship
- Willie Miller – Philippine team member 2009 FIBA Asia Championship
- Chris Calaguio - 1996 ABC 22-under Championship, 2001 SEA Games
- Eric Rodriguez – 2007 SEA games gold medalist
- Boyet Bautista – 2007 SEA games gold medalist
- Allan Salangsang – 2007 SEA games gold medalist
- Rey Guevarra – member Smart-Gilas 1.0
- RJ Jazul – member Smart-Gilas 1.0
- Raymond Almazan – 2017 SEABA gold medalist, Philippine team member 2017 FIBA Asia Cup and 2019 FIBA World Cup
- Kevin Alas – 2013 SEA Games gold medalist, 2014 FIBA Asia Cup bronze medalist, 2023 Asian Games gold medalist
- Rey Nambatac – 2012 SEABA Under-18 gold medalist
- Fran Yu – 2016 SEABA Under-18 gold medalist, Philippine team member 2016 FIBA Asia Under-18 Championship
- Rhenz Abando – Philippine team member 2022 FIBA Asia Cup, 2023 FIBA Basketball World Cup qualification (Asia), 2023 FIBA Basketball World Cup
