= Bibiano =

Bibiano is both a given name and a surname. Notable people with the name include:

- Bibiano Fernandes (born 1980), Brazilian mixed martial artist
- Bibiano Fernandes (born 1976), Brazilian footballer
- Bibiano Ouano (1915–1960), Filipino basketball player
- Bibiano Zapirain (1919–2000), Uruguayan footballer
- Lucas Ribamar Lopes dos Santos Bibiano (born 1997), Brazilian footballer
- Pedro de Alcântara João Carlos Leopoldo Salvador Bibiano Francisco Xavier de Paula Leocádio Miguel Gabriel Rafael Gonzaga (1825–1891), full name of Pedro II of Brazil, Brazilian monarch
