= Eugene Quilban =

Filipino basketball player (1966–2024)

Personal information
- Born: March 25, 1966
- Died: August 17, 2024 (aged 58) Quezon City, Philippines
- Listed height: 5 ft 7 in (1.70 m)

Career information
- College: San Sebastian
- PBA draft: 1991: 1st round, 3rd overall pick
- Drafted by: Alaska Milkmen
- Playing career: 1991–2002

Career history
- 1991: Alaska Milkmen
- 1992–1996: 7-Up Uncolas / Pepsi Mega Bottlers / Mobiline Cellulars
- 1997: Pop Cola Bottlers
- 1998: Davao Eagles
- 1999: Sta. Lucia Realtors
- ~2000: Cagayan de Oro
- 2002: Cebu Gems

Eugene Quilban (March 25, 1966 – August 17, 2024) was a Filipino professional basketball player who mostly played for the Pepsi Mega Bottlers in the Philippine Basketball Association (PBA).

== Early life and education ==
Quilban was born on March 25, 1966. He studied at the University of Manila and later the San Sebastian College.

== Career ==
=== Playing career ===
==== San Sebastian Stags ====
Quilban played for the San Sebastian Stags in the basketball tournament of the National Collegiate Athletic Association (NCAA). He helped the stag win back-to-back titles in 1988 and 1989 (Seasons 65 and 66).

=== PBA ===
At the 1991 draft of the Philippine Basketball Association, Quilban was third overall pick and was selected by the Alaska Milkmen. For that season, Alaska would clinch the third conference title with Quilban being named Rookie of the Year.

He would be traded to the 7-Up Uncolas in 1992 leading the team to a finals appearance in the 1992 third conference. Its with 7-Up, which was renamed as the Pepsi Mega Bottlers in 1993, and Mobiline Cellulars in 1996, where he would play for the most in his eight-season-long stint in the PBA. With 7-Up he would make 28 assists in the 123–100 win against Shell Rimula X in the 1992; the PBA record for the most assists by a player which persists as of 2022.

He would also play for Pop Cola Bottlers in 1997. His last PBA team was with Sta. Lucia Realtors in 1999.

=== MBA ===
Quilban would play for the Davao Eagles in the inaugural 1998 Metropolitan Basketball Association (MBA) season. In 2000, he would be with Cagayan de Oro. In 2002 he moved to the Cebu Gems until the MBA's dissolution within the same year, effectively retiring from competitive basketball.

=== Coaching ===
Quilban would be brought in as an assistant coach for the San Sebastian Stags under head coach Egay Macaraya in 2016.

== Illness and death ==
Quilban would be diagnosed with pancreatic cancer in 2023. He died from complications of the disease at the Philippine Heart Center in Quezon City, on August 17, 2024, at the age of 58.
