= NCAA Season 63 basketball tournaments =

1987 NCAA season
- Host school: Colegio de San Juan de Letran
| Men's Finals | G1 | G2 | G3 | Wins |
|---|---|---|---|---|
| Letran Knights | 81 | 93 | 63 | 2 |
| San Sebastian Stags | 91 | 90 | 62 | 1 |
- Duration: October 1–9, 1987
- Arena(s): Rizal Memorial Coliseum
- Winning coach: Eddie Reyes

Juniors' tournament
- Champions: San Beda Red Cubs
- Winning coach: Ato Badolato

The 1987 NCAA basketball tournament was the 63rd season in the Philippine National Collegiate Athletic Association (NCAA). The Letran Knights successfully defended their championship in the Seniors division, while the San Beda Red Cubs clinched their first Juniors championship, returning from a leave of absence.

== Men's tournament ==
=== Elimination round ===
Format:

- Tournament divided into two halves: winners of the two halves dispute the championship in a best-of-3 finals series unless:
  - A team wins both rounds. In that case, the winning team automatically wins the championship.
  - A third team has a better cumulative record than both finalists. In that case, the third team has to win in a playoff against the team that won the second round to face the team that won in the first round in a best-of-3 finals series.

==== First round team standings ====
| Pos | Team | W | L | Pts | Qualification |
|---|---|---|---|---|---|
| 1 | San Sebastian Stags | 4 | 1 | 9 (Note: First round pennant playoff: San Sebastian 80–76 Letran) | Finals |
| 2 | Letran Knights (H) | 4 | 1 | 9 | |
| 3 | JRC Heavy Bombers | 3 | 2 | 8 | |
| 4 | PHCR Altas | 2 | 3 | 7 | |
| 5 | Mapúa Cardinals | 1 | 4 | 6 | |
| 6 | San Beda Red Lions | 1 | 4 | 6 | |

Rules for classification: 1) tournament points; 2) if tied for #1, one-game playoff; 3) head-to-head record; 4) head-to-head point differential; 5) overall point differential
(H) Hosts

==== Second round team standings ====
| Pos | Team | W | L | Pts | Qualification |
|---|---|---|---|---|---|
| 1 | Letran Knights (H) | 5 | 0 | 10 | Finals |
| 2 | San Sebastian Stags | 4 | 1 | 9 | |
| 3 | PHCR Altas | 3 | 2 | 8 | |
| 4 | JRC Heavy Bombers | 2 | 3 | 7 | |
| 5 | Mapúa Cardinals | 1 | 4 | 6 | |
| 6 | San Beda Red Lions | 0 | 5 | 5 | |

Rules for classification: 1) tournament points; 2) if tied for #1, one-game playoff; 3) head-to-head record; 4) head-to-head point differential; 5) overall point differential
(H) Hosts

==== Cumulative standings ====
No other team had a better cumulative record than the two pennant winners, so playoff for the Finals berth was not played.

| Pos | Team | W | L | Pts | Qualification |
|---|---|---|---|---|---|
| 1 | Letran Knights (H) | 9 | 1 | 19 | Finals |
| 2 | San Sebastian Stags | 8 | 2 | 18 | Finals |
| 3 | PHCR Altas | 5 | 5 | 15 | |
| 4 | JRC Heavy Bombers | 5 | 5 | 15 | |
| 5 | Mapúa Cardinals | 2 | 8 | 12 | |
| 6 | San Beda Red Lions | 1 | 9 | 11 | |

Rules for classification: 1) tournament points; 2) head-to-head record; 3) head-to-head point differential; 4) overall point differential
(H) Hosts

San Sebastian clinched the first round pennant via a playoff; they defeated Letran in the said playoff to win the first round flag.

Letran denied San Sebastian the outright championship with a 94–91 overtime victory at the Rizal Memorial Coliseum. With Letran up, Jerry Ruiz fouled San Sebastian's Arnold Adlawan with 0.9 seconds left in regulation. Adlawan scored on a free-throw to tie the game at 82. In the overtime period, Letran never trailed as Fil-Am William Johnson and local Roberto Ruiz prevented San Sebastian's Eugene Quilban and foreign-student Napoleon Hatton from scoring. In the final three seconds of overtime, Letran's Fernando Libed, under medication for hepatitis, secured the win with a three-point play off a foul from Hatton.

=== Finals ===
==== Game 1 ====
October 1

| Letran Knights | 81–91 | San Sebastian Stags |
San Sebastian leads series 1–0

Rizal Memorial Coliseum, Manila

SSC National team player Paul Alvarez played sparingly. The Stags led early, but Letran had a 14–4 run to tie the score 58–all for the first time; Erwin Santos scored for Letran to put them up for the first time, 68–67 with 9:30 left in the game. Saturnino Garrido then scored all of his eight points in the final six minutes to bring the lead back to SSC for good at 75–68 with 6:27 left. Letran's center Alberto David fouled out which the Stags used to their advantage off quick baskets from Garrido and Eugene Quilban for an 81–70 lead. Letran cut the deficit to 79–87 but the Quilban and Napoleon Hatton scored in the final two minutes to prevent the Knights from a come-from-behind victory.

==== Game 2 ====
October 6

| Letran Knights | 93–90 | San Sebastian Stags |
Series tied 1–1

Rizal Memorial Coliseum, Manila

After taking the halftime lead 50–47, Letran and San Sebastian remained close, but Letran pulled away in the fourth quarter off team captain Fernando Libed's eight points to give Letran an 84–79 lead. The Stags rallied to tie the game 90–all after trailing by eight points: Alvarez scored on a fastbreak and two free-throws off a foul from David, Garrido scored on a jump-shot, then Quilban converted on a lay-up to tie the score. Robert Ruiz scored on two free-throws for Letran off Garrido's foul to put Letran up, 92–90. Rookie Erwin Santos, playing for Libed who was suffering from cramps, blocked Garrido's shot with 14 seconds remaining; with three seconds left, he then intercepted Alvarez' pass to Arnold Adlawan. The Stags then resorted to fouling Ruiz, who made one of his two free-throws as time expired to tie the series for a deciding third game.

==== Game 3 ====
October 9

| Letran Knights | 63–62 | San Sebastian Stags |
Letran wins series 2–1

Rizal Memorial Coliseum, Manila

San Sebastian led 31–18 when SSC coach Tolentino placed Hatton or Allan de los Reyes as safety men to prevent Letran's fastbreaks. Hatton scored six more points to extend SSC's lead to 37–25, but William Johnson and Arthur Ayson scored for Letran to cut the lead to eight 29–37 at the half. Letran scored on fastbreaks to seize the lead 45–40 but Alvarez and Hatton scored to bring back the lead to the Stags 58–53 with 5:54 to go. Further scoring from the two gave the Stags a 62–55 edge with 4:52 left. San Sebastian then opted to dribble away at their possessions, including waiving their free-throw attempts, while Letran cut the SSC lead to one point 62–61. At the last SSC possession, Quilban dribbled away at the top of the key, but the ball got stranded at the low post that resulted in a missed shot from Rizaldo Bade. Roberto Ruiz grabbed the rebound for Letran, passed to David at midcourt who passed the ball to Ayson. Ayson passed the ball to Libed, who drove to the basket and converted a jump-shot off the Stags' Melchor Teves, de los Reyes and Hatton with 1.2 seconds left, to secure Letran's defense of the championship. Letran coach Eddie Reyes wore the same shirt he won on the 1986 championship-clinching game also against San Sebastian. The Letran faithful gave their Santo Niño a victory ride after the game's conclusion.

=== Awards ===
NCAA Season 63 men's basketball champions
Letran Knights
11th title, second consecutive title

== Juniors' tournament ==
The San Beda Red Cubs won the juniors' championship, their first after their return from a leave of absence from 1983 to 1985. The Red Cubs won the title by winning both pennants, with its only loss coming from the San Sebastian Staglets.

=== Awards ===
NCAA Season 63 juniors' basketball champions
San Beda Red Cubs
Sixth title

== See also ==
- UAAP Season 50 men's basketball tournament

| Preceded by Season 62 (1986) | NCAA basketball seasons Season 63 (1987) | Succeeded by Season 64 (1988) |
