= NCAA Season 67 basketball tournaments =

1991 Philippine college basketball season

1991 NCAA season
- Host school: San Beda College
Men's Finals	G1	G2	G3	Wins
Mapúa Cardinals	103	94	91	2
San Beda Red Lions	94	100	90	1
- Duration: October 9–16, 1991
- Arena(s): ULTRA
- Finals MVP: Benny Cheng
- Winning coach: Joel Banal
- TV network(s): Islands TV 13
Juniors' Finals	G1	G2	G3	Wins
Mapúa Red Robins	75	89	60	1
San Beda Red Cubs	93	80	79	2
- Duration: October 9–16, 1991
- Arena(s): ULTRA
- Finals MVP: Tyrone Bautista
- Winning coach: Ato Badolato

The 1991 NCAA basketball tournament was the 67th season in the Philippine National Collegiate Athletic Association (NCAA). The season opens on August 3 at the Araneta Coliseum and ended on October 16 with the Mapua Cardinals winning back-to-back championships in the Seniors division and won their 5th NCAA crown.

== Teams ==
Team	School	Men's coach
Letran Knights	Colegio de San Juan de Letran	Rudy Hines
JRC Heavy Bombers	Jose Rizal College	Egay Gomez
Mapúa Cardinals	Mapúa Institute of Technology	Joel Banal
PHCR Altas	Perpetual Help College of Rizal	Angel Ascue
San Beda Red Lions	San Beda College	Orly Castelo
San Sebastian Stags	San Sebastian College - Recoletos	Arturo Valenzona

== Men's tournament ==
=== Elimination round ===
Format:

- Tournament divided into two halves: winners of the two halves dispute the championship in a best-of-3 finals series unless:
  - A team wins both rounds. In that case, the winning team automatically wins the championship.
  - A third team has a better cumulative record than both finalists. In that case, the third team has to win in a playoff against the team that won the second round to face the team that won in the first round in a best-of-3 finals series.

==== First round team standings ====
Pos	Team	W	L	Pts	Qualification
1	San Beda Red Lions (H)	5	0	10	Finals
2	Mapúa Cardinals	3	2	8	
3	JRC Heavy Bombers	3	2	8	
4	Letran Knights	2	3	7	
5	PHCR Altas	1	4	6	
6	San Sebastian Stags	1	4	6	

Rules for classification: 1) tournament points; 2) if tied for #1, one-game playoff; 3) head-to-head record; 4) head-to-head point differential; 5) overall point differential
(H) Hosts

==== Second round team standings ====
Pos	Team	W	L	Pts	Qualification
1	Mapúa Cardinals	5	0	10	Finals
2	San Beda Red Lions (H)	3	2	8	
3	San Sebastian Stags	2	3	7	
4	JRC Heavy Bombers	2	3	7	
5	PHCR Altas	2	3	7	
6	Letran Knights	1	4	6	

Rules for classification: 1) tournament points; 2) if tied for #2, one-game playoff; 3) head-to-head record; 4) head-to-head point differential; 5) overall point differential
(H) Hosts

==== Cumulative standings ====
No other team had a better cumulative record than the two pennant winners, so playoff for the Finals berth was not played.

Pos	Team	W	L	Pts	Qualification
1	Mapúa Cardinals	8	2	18	Finals
2	San Beda Red Lions (H)	8	2	18	Finals
3	JRC Heavy Bombers	5	5	15	
4	San Sebastian Stags	3	7	13	
5	Letran Knights	3	7	13	
6	PHCR Altas	3	7	13	

Rules for classification: 1) tournament points; 2) head-to-head record; 3) head-to-head point differential; 4) overall point differential
(H) Hosts

Mapua Cardinals wins the second round flag and forces a best-of-three title playoffs with first round winner San Beda College by downing the Red Lions on the last day of the eliminations on October 2.

=== Finals ===
October 9

Mapúa Cardinals	103–94	San Beda Red Lions

ULTRA, Pasig

October 14

Mapúa Cardinals	94–100	San Beda Red Lions

ULTRA, Pasig

Islands TV 13

October 16

Mapúa Cardinals	91–90	San Beda Red Lions
Mapua wins series 2–1

ULTRA, Pasig

- Finals Most Outstanding Player: Benny Cheng (Mapúa Cardinals)

In Game 1, Mapua had their biggest lead at 96-81 with 3:20 remaining. But the Red Lions' unlikely trio of Reynaldo Dionisio, Cornelio Manucat and last year's junior MVP Vincent Largo put San Beda to within 90-96 in the last 1:43. A triple by Olegario Topacio which beat the shotclock and two free throws by Reuben dela Rosa got the Cardinals off the hook.

With reserves Cornelio Manucat, Reynaldo Dionisio, Renato Morano and Jose Ramil Espina thrown into the limelight of championship action, the Red Lions broke away at 91-78 in the last 2:25 of Game 2. A 14-4 Mapua counter triggered by Olegario Topacio and Winchester Lemen put the Cardinals to within 92-95 in the last 45 seconds.

Cardinal slotman Benito Cheng beat all rebounders for a follow-up in the final five seconds of Game 3 and an awry pass spoiled the Red Lions' last offensive. There was no San Beda timeout and what ensued was a quick inbound to Cornelio Manucat who dribbled toward the centerline before issuing a breast-pass to a streaking Reynaldo Dionisio. The pass was too strong and a bit high, lipping Dionisio's fingertips before going out of bounds with a stream of Mapua supporters entering the court at the buzzer.

=== Awards ===
NCAA Season 67 men's basketball champions
Mapúa Cardinals
Fifth title, second consecutive title

- Most Valuable Player: Antonio Valeriano (San Beda Red Lions)

== Juniors' tournament ==
=== Finals ===
October 9

Mapúa Red Robins	75–93	San Beda Red Cubs

ULTRA, Pasig

October 14

Mapúa Red Robins	89–80	San Beda Red Cubs

ULTRA, Pasig

October 16

Mapúa Red Robins	60–79	San Beda Red Cubs
San Beda wins series 2–1

ULTRA, Pasig

- Finals Most Outstanding Player: Tyrone Bautista (San Beda Red Cubs)

The San Beda Red Cubs won Game 1 off the heroics of Tyrone Bautista, Emerson Roque and Cesar Tolentino, who combined for 53 points. The Red Robins tied the series on Game 2. On the deciding Game 3, Bautista led the Red Cubs anew, winning back-to-back titles.

=== Awards ===
NCAA Season 67 juniors' basketball champions
San Beda Red Cubs
Eighth title

- Most Valuable Player: Tyrone Bautista (San Beda Red Cubs)

== See also ==
- UAAP Season 54 men's basketball tournament

Preceded by Season 66 (1990)	NCAA basketball seasons Season 67 (1991)	Succeeded by Season 68 (1992)
