= 2026 Letran Knights basketball team =

Basketball team in the Philippines

2026 Letran Knights men's basketball

Record
- Elims rank: #
- Head coach: Allen Ricardo (3rd season)
- Assistant coaches: Kris Reyes (First Assistant); Michael Buendia; John Carl Melegrito; Bong Solian
- Captain: Kevin Santos (5th season)

The 2026 Letran Knights men's basketball team is representing Colegio de San Juan de Letran in the 102nd season of the National Collegiate Athletic Association in the Philippines. The men's basketball tournament for the school year 2026-27 began on September 13, 2026, and the host school for the season is San Beda University.

The group stage format is used again this season. The Knights were placed alongside Arellano, EAC, Perpetual Help, and San Sebastian.

The Knights finished the placing round at first place in Group B with 9 wins and 4 losses. They returned to the Final Four after beating the Mapúa Cardinals in the quarterfinals.

== Roster changes ==
The Knights lost several players from previous season. Veterans Deo Cuajao, Mark Omega, and Jun Roque were drafted in the 2025 PBA rookie draft.

Players from last season's rotation have transferred to other schools. Among them are Peter Rosilio and Luiz Tapenio, who both transferred to Emilio Aguinaldo College.

The Knights will parade eleven rookies from their current roster. Among them is George Diamante, who will finally reunite with former Letran Squires teammate Jonathan Manalili. George Diamante, the 2024 National Basketball Training Center's ninth best high school player, and the back-to-back NCAA Juniors basketball All-Defensive team and Mythical Five member, was a key cog in Letran’s dominance in the juniors scene, having helped the Squires rule Seasons 98 and 99.

Another product of the Letran Squires, Justin Cargo will also suit up for the Knights. During the NCAA Season 101 preliminary round, he averaged 9.23 points, 6.0 rebounds, 2.38 assists, and 1.54 steals per game. In the Finals, he helped the Squires defeat Arellano University and claim the championship. Cargo also bagged the NCAA Juniors Finals MVP. Cargo will be joined by his fellow Season 101 championship teammates Daryl Valdeavilla and Alvin Villanueva.

Among the transferees who will suit up for the Knights is Denzil Walker. The Filipino-American wingman previously played in UAAP Season 87 for the University of the Philippines Fighting Maroons.

=== Departures ===
Pos.	Nat.	Name	Height	High School	Notes
F	(Philippines)	Edry Alejandro	6' 4"	University of the East	Transferred to Mapúa University
G	(Philippines)	Jovel Baliling	5' 11"	Colegio de San Juan de Letran	Transferred to Olivarez College
G	(Philippines)	Deo Cuajao	6' 1"	Holy Child College of Davao	Declared for the PBA season 50 draft; Selected 22nd overall by Rain or Shine Elasto Painters
G	(Philippines)	Alex Gazzingan	6' 2"	Colegio de San Juan de Letran	Transferred to St. Clare College of Caloocan
G	(Philippines)	Edvil Mundas	6' 1"	Holy Child College of Davao	Transferred to Emilio Aguinaldo College
C	(Philippines)	Mark Omega	6' 5"	Colegio de San Juan de Letran	Declared for the PBA season 50 draft; Selected 20th overall by Rain or Shine Elasto Painters
F	(Philippines)	Joss Poli	6' 3"	Lyceum of the Philippines University	Transferred to Philippine Christian University–Dasmariñas
F	(Philippines)	Jun Roque	6' 4"	Colegio de San Juan de Letran	Declared for the PBA season 50 draft; Selected 12th overall by Rain or Shine Elasto Painters
G	(Philippines)	Peter Rosilio	5' 10"	Adamson University	Transferred to Emilio Aguinaldo College
F	(Philippines)	Luiz Tapenio	6' 2"	New Prodon Academy Valenzuela	Transferred to Emilio Aguinaldo College
G	(Philippines)	Elijah Yusi	6' 2"	Arellano University	Transferred to Far Eastern University

=== Acquisitions ===
Pos.	Nat.	Name	Height	High School	Notes
G	(Philippines)	Mark Borrero	5' 11"	De La Salle Santiago Zobel School	Rookie
G	(Philippines)	Justin Cargo	6' 0"	Colegio de San Juan de Letran	Rookie
F	(Philippines)	George Diamante	6' 4"	Colegio de San Juan de Letran	Promoted from Team B
G	(Philippines)	Chris Dy	5' 11"	Arellano University	Rookie
F	(Philippines)	Justine Hugo	6' 2"	Colegio de San Juan de Letran	Promoted from Team B
G	(Philippines)	Ranz Muyuela	5' 11"	La Salle Greenhills	Promoted from Team B
G	(Philippines)	Froilan Reyes	6' 0"	Malayan High School of Science	Rookie
G	(Philippines)	Lance Siena	6' 3"	La Consolacion College Manila	Promoted from Team B
G	(Philippines)	Daryl Valdeavilla	6' 2"	Colegio de San Juan de Letran	Rookie
G	(Philippines)	Alvin Villanueva	5' 11"	Colegio de San Juan de Letran	Rookie
F	(United States)	Denzil Walker	6' 4"	Camden High School (Minneapolis)	Promoted from Team B

== Roster ==
Letran Knights roster
Players
Coaches

Pos.	No.	Nat.	Name	Height	Year	High School
G	12	(Philippines)	Borrero, Mark Ronald	5'11" (1.8m)	1	De La Salle Santiago Zobel School
F	14	(Philippines)	Buensalida, Aaron James	6'5" (1.96m)	2	Nazareth School-NU
G	9	(Philippines)	Cargo, Justin Rafael	6'0" (1.83m)	1	Colegio de San Juan de Letran
F	24	(Philippines)	Diamante, George T.	6'4" (1.93m)	1	Colegio de San Juan de Letran
G	22	(Philippines)	Dy, Chris John	5'11" (1.8m)	1	Arellano University
G	26	(Philippines)	Estrada, John Sherick	6'0" (1.83m)	3	St. Clare College Caloocan
G	3	(Canada)	Gammad, Lorge Reinier B.	6'0" (1.83m)	2	A.R. MacNeill Secondary School
F	27	(Philippines)	Hugo, Justine Shane	6'2" (1.88m)	1	Colegio de San Juan de Letran
PG	13	(Philippines)	Manalili, Jonathan Moses	6'0" (1.83m)	2	Colegio de San Juan de Letran
PG	7	(Philippines)	Montecillo, Nathaniel	5'9" (1.75m)	3	UP Integrated School
G	18	(Philippines)	Muyuela, Ranz Ezekiel	5'11" (1.8m)	1	La Salle Green Hills
G	31	(Philippines)	Reyes, Froilan Jr.	6'0" (1.83m)	1	Mapúa University
C	4	(Philippines)	Santos, Kevin Kyle (C)	6'6" (1.98m)	5	St. Augustine Institute of Pampanga
G	16	(Philippines)	Siena, Lance Daniel L.	6'3" (1.91m)	1	La Consolacion College Manila
G	17	(Philippines)	Valdeavilla, Don Daryl	6'2" (1.88m)	1	Colegio de San Juan de Letran
G	10	(Philippines)	Villanueva, Alvin Rex	5'11" (1.8m)	1	Colegio de San Juan de Letran
G	5	(United States)	Walker, Denzil Dominick S.	6'4" (1.93m)	1	Camden High School Minneapolis

Head coach

- Joseph Allen Ricardo

Assistant coach(es)

- Kristoffer Reyes (First Assistant)
- Michael Gregg Buendia
- John Carl Melegrito
- Bong Solian
- Jinino Manansala Sr.
- Mac Villarba

Strength & conditioning coach(es)

- Brian Cay
- Daryl Diaz (Assistant)

Team Staff

- Mark Anthony Guiao

Team manager

- John Paul Beltrano
- Seth Jarell Diamse (assistant)
- Joshua Railey Motio (assistant)

Legend

- (C) Team captain
- Injured

=== Depth chart ===
Pos.	Starting 5	Bench 1	Bench 2
C	Buensalida	Santos	Hugo
PF	Walker	Diamante	Siena
SF	Cargo	Estrada	Valdeavilla
SG	Gammad	Reyes	Villanueva
PG	Manalili	Montecillo	Muyuela

== NCAA Season 102 games results ==
Elimination games are played in a format inspired by the NBA play-in tournament and the U.S. NCAA Division I men's basketball tournament. All games are livestreamed via the YouTube channel of One Sports and the official livestreaming mobile app of Cignal TV, CignalPlay. Games are also televised live on Cignal's dedicated sports cable channel for the NCAA, NCAA NXT. On free TV, all games scheduled at 5 p.m. are aired live on RPTV, while 3 p.m. games are televised on a delayed basis.

Date	Time	Opponent	Venue	Result	Record
Eliminations
Sep 13	4:00 p.m.	Perpetual Altas	Mall of Asia Arena • Pasay	W 84-77	1-0
Game Highs: Points: Walker – 21; Rebounds: Santos – 8; Assists: Manalili – 8
Sep 18	5:00 p.m.	San Sebastian Stags	Playtime Filoil Centre • San Juan	W 99-62	2-0
Game Highs: Points: Walker – 25; Rebounds: Diamante – 10; Assists: Manalili – 9
Sep 24	5:00 p.m.	EAC Generals	Playtime Filoil Centre • San Juan	W 91-80	3-0
Game Highs: Points: Cargo – 22; Rebounds: Santos – 10; Assists: Manalili – 14
Sep 28	5:00 p.m.	Arellano Chiefs	Playtime Filoil Centre • San Juan	L 81-82	3-1
Game Highs: Points: Gammad – 23; Rebounds: Walker – 11; Assists: Montecillo – 4
Oct 5	5:00 p.m.	San Beda Red Lions	Playtime Filoil Centre • San Juan	L 65-74^{OT}	3-2
Game Highs: Points: Estrada – 17; Rebounds: Estrada, Hugo, Manalili – 5 each; Assists: Manalili – 8
Oct 8	3:00 p.m.	Lyceum Pirates	Playtime Filoil Centre • San Juan	W 96-86	4-2
Game Highs: Points: Estrada – 25; Rebounds: Walker – 6; Assists: Manalili – 12
Oct 12	5:00 p.m.	Mapúa Cardinals	Playtime Filoil Centre • San Juan	L 67-69^{OT}	4-3
Game Highs: Points: Gammad – 18; Rebounds: Santos – 9; Assists: Cargo – 8
Oct 15	5:00 p.m.	JRU Heavy Bombers	Playtime Filoil Centre • San Juan	W 70-66	5-3
Game Highs: Points: Gammad – 21; Rebounds: Hugo – 5; Assists: Montecillo – 4
Oct 20	3:00 p.m.	Benilde Blazers	Playtime Filoil Centre • San Juan	W 83-72	6-3
Game Highs: Points: Walker – 21; Rebounds: Walker – 7; Assists: Estrada – 6
Oct 23	3:00 p.m.	San Sebastian Stags	Playtime Filoil Centre • San Juan	W 91-89	7-3
Game Highs: Points: Gammad – 23; Rebounds: Buensalida, Estrada – 6 each; Assists: Montecillo, Walker – 6 each
Oct 29	5:00 p.m.	Arellano Chiefs	Playtime Filoil Centre • San Juan	W 91-77	8-3
Game Highs: Points: Estrada – 25; Rebounds: Santos – 9; Assists: Santos – 5
Nov 5	3:00 p.m.	EAC Generals	Playtime Filoil Centre • San Juan	L 71-78	8-4
Game Highs: Points: Buensalida, Estrada – 15 each; Rebounds: Walker – 8; Assists: Montecillo – 5
Nov 10	3:00 p.m.	Perpetual Altas	Playtime Filoil Centre • San Juan	W 85-83	9-4
Game Highs: Points: Estrada – 19; Rebounds: Manalili – 6; Assists: Estrada, Manalili, Montecillo – 4 each
1st place in Group B with 9 wins–4 losses
Quarterfinals
Nov 17	3:00 p.m.	Mapúa Cardinals	Playtime Filoil Centre • San Juan	W 86-75	10-4
Game Highs: Points: Cargo – 19; Rebounds: Santos – 6; Assists: Manalili – 8
Letran wins series in one game
Final Four
Nov 23	5:00 p.m.	JRU Heavy Bombers	Mall of Asia Arena • Pasay		
Nov 26	3:00 p.m.	JRU Heavy Bombers	Mall of Asia Arena • Pasay		
–

Times listed above are in UTC+08:00

Source: NCAA PH Livestats
