= NCAA Season 64 basketball tournaments =

1988 NCAA season
- Host school: Jose Rizal College

Men's tournament
- Champions: San Sebastian Stags
- First runner-up: PHCR Altas
- Winning coach: Francis Rodriguez

Juniors' tournament
- Champions: San Beda Red Cubs
- First runner-up: JRC Light Bombers
- Winning coach: Ato Badolato

The 1988 NCAA basketball tournaments were the 64th year of the National Collegiate Athletic Association (Philippines)' basketball tournaments. The San Sebastian Stags won both rounds of elimination, becoming outright champions of the seniors' division; the San Beda Red Cubs also won both rounds in the juniors' division, with the JRC Light Bombers coming in second.

== Men's tournament ==
=== Elimination round ===
Format:

- Tournament divided into two halves: winners of the two halves dispute the championship in a best-of-3 finals series unless:
  - A team wins both rounds. In that case, the winning team automatically wins the championship.
  - A third team has a better cumulative record than both finalists. In that case, the third team has to win in a playoff against the team that won the second round to face the team that won in the first round in a best-of-3 finals series.

==== First round team standings ====
Pos	Team	W	L	Pts	Qualification
1	San Sebastian Stags	5	0	10	Finals
2	PHCR Altas	3	2	8	
3	San Beda Red Lions	3	2	8	
4	Mapúa Cardinals	2	3	7	
5	Letran Knights	1	4	6	
6	JRC Heavy Bombers (H)	1	4	6	

Rules for classification: 1) tournament points; 2) if tied for #1, one-game playoff; 3) head-to-head record; 4) head-to-head point differential; 5) overall point differential
(H) Hosts

==== Second round team standings ====
Pos	Team	W	L	Pts	Qualification
1	San Sebastian Stags	5	0	10	Finals
2	Letran Knights	4	1	9	
3	PHCR Altas	3	2	8	
4	Mapúa Cardinals	2	3	7	
5	San Beda Red Lions	1	4	6	
6	JRC Heavy Bombers (H)	0	5	5	

Rules for classification: 1) tournament points; 2) if tied for #1, one-game playoff; 3) head-to-head record; 4) head-to-head point differential; 5) overall point differential
(H) Hosts

==== Cumulative standings ====
San Sebastian won both pennants, and were named automatic champions without need for the finals.

Pos	Team	W	L	Pts	Qualification
1	San Sebastian Stags (C)	10	0	20	Automatic champions (Note: As San Sebastian won both pennants, they were declared automatic champions.)
2	PHCR Altas	6	4	16	
3	Letran Knights	5	5	15	
4	Mapúa Cardinals	4	6	14	
5	San Beda Red Lions	4	6	14	
6	JRC Heavy Bombers (H)	1	9	11	

Rules for classification: 1) tournament points; 2) head-to-head record; 3) head-to-head point differential; 4) overall point differential
(C) Champions; (H) Hosts
Notes:

In a rematch of the 1987 first round finale, San Sebastian prevailed over Letran 77–73 preventing a comeback from the Knights which cut the 38–58 SSC lead to a 2-point 71–73 deficit. Paul Alvarez tipped on a miss from a fellow Stag, but Letran's Robert Ruiz split his two free-throws to keep pace with SSC, 72–75. Marlon Bolabola put up a free-throw, then Melchor Teves grabbed the rebound, that led to Crizalde Bade converting two free-throws for SSC off a Jerry Ruiz foul.to put San Sebastian up for good 77–73.

In the penultimate second-round game for both teams, San Sebastian defeated Letran 85–84 as Eugene Quilban prevented Jerry Ruiz from catching the ball in a pick-and-roll attempt with 2.7 seconds left. With the Perpetual Altas needing to win to force a three-way tie for first, the Altas succumbed to a 14–4 SSC run with 5:20 to go in the second half to turn a 77–70 SSC lead to a 90–74 rout. The Stags held on to a 108–94 victory, clinching the second round pennant. With San Sebastian winning both halves of the elimination round, San Sebastian were named outright champions, their third league championship.

=== Awards ===
NCAA Season 64 men's basketball champions
San Sebastian Stags
Third title

== Juniors' tournament ==
=== Elimination round ===
Format:

- Tournament divided into two halves: winners of the two halves dispute the championship in a best-of-3 finals series unless:
  - A team wins both rounds. In that case, the winning team automatically wins the championship.
  - A third team has a better cumulative record than both finalists. In that case, the third team has to win in a playoff against the team that won the second round to face the team that won in the first round in a best-of-3 finals series.

==== First round team standings ====
Team	W	L	Pts.
San Beda Red Cubs	5	0	10
**JRC Light Bombers**	4	1	9
Letran Squires	3	2	8
Perpetual Altalettes	2	3	7
San Sebastian Staglets	2	3	7
Mapua Red Robins	0	5	5

Season host is boldfaced.

Qualified to the Finals

==== Second round team standings ====
Team	W	L	Pts.
San Beda Red Cubs	5	0	10
**JRC Light Bombers**	4	1	9
Letran Squires			
Perpetual Altalettes			
San Sebastian Staglets			
Mapua Red Robins			

Season host is boldfaced.

Qualified to the Finals

==== Cumulative standings ====
Team	W	L	Pts.
San Beda Red Cubs	10	0	20
**JRC Light Bombers**	8	2	18
Letran Squires			
Perpetual Altalettes			
San Sebastian Staglets			
Mapua Red Robins			

Season host is boldfaced.

The San Beda Red Cubs won the first round pennant after a ten-point victory over the JRU Light Bombers, after trailing at halftime 33–39. Needing to win to force a playoff for the second round pennant, the Light Bombers fell short to the Red Cubs at the final game of the second round when John Henry Reyes split his free-throw at the final seconds of the game, giving San Beda a 1-point 92–91 victory.

=== Awards ===
NCAA Season 64 juniors' basketball champions
San Beda Red Cubs
Seventh title, second consecutive title

== See also ==
- UAAP Season 51 men's basketball tournament

Preceded by Season 63 (1987)	NCAA basketball seasons Season 64 (1988)	Succeeded by Season 65 (1989)
