= Bibiano Ouano =

Filipino basketball player

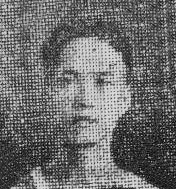

Personal information
- Born: December 2, 1915 Mandaue, Philippine Islands
- Died: November 1960 (aged 44) Tokyo, Japan

Bibiano "Bing" R. Ouano (December 2, 1915 – November 1960) was a Filipino basketball player. He competed in the men's tournament at the 1936 Summer Olympics. He was a native of Cebu.

He is part of the Cebu Sports Hall of Fame.
