= NCAA Season 65 basketball tournaments =

1989 NCAA season
- Host school: Mapua Institute of Technology
Men's Finals	G1 (OT)	G2	G3	Wins
San Sebastian Stags	118	88	102	2
PHCR Altas	115	95	93	1
- Duration: October –19, 1989
- Arena: Rizal Memorial Coliseum
- Winning coach: Francis Rodriguez

The 1989 NCAA basketball tournament was the 65th season in the Philippine National Collegiate Athletic Association (NCAA). The season opens on July 30 at the Araneta Coliseum and it ended with the San Sebastian Stags successfully defending their championship in the Seniors division. The year's host was Mapua Tech.

== Men's tournament ==
=== Elimination round ===
Format:

- Tournament divided into two halves: winners of the two halves dispute the championship in a best-of-3 finals series unless:
  - A team wins both rounds. In that case, the winning team automatically wins the championship.
  - A third team has a better cumulative record than both finalists. In that case, the third team has to win in a playoff against the team that won the second round to face the team that won in the first round in a best-of-3 finals series.

==== First round team standings ====
Pos	Team	W	L	Pts	Qualification
1	PHCR Altas	4	1	9	Finals
2	Letran Knights	3	2	8	
3	San Sebastian Stags	3	2	8	
4	Mapúa Cardinals (H)	2	3	7	
5	JRC Heavy Bombers	2	3	7	
6	San Beda Red Lions	1	4	6	

Rules for classification: 1) tournament points; 2) if tied for #1, one-game playoff; 3) head-to-head record; 4) head-to-head point differential; 5) overall point differential
(H) Hosts

==== Second round team standings ====
Pos	Team	W	L	Pts	Qualification
1	San Sebastian Stags	3	2	8 (Note: Second round pennant playoffs: San Sebastian won.)	Finals
2	Mapúa Cardinals (H)	3	2	8	
3	PHCR Altas	3	2	8	
4	Letran Knights	3	2	8	
5	San Beda Red Lions	2	3	7	
6	JRC Heavy Bombers	1	4	6	

Rules for classification: 1) tournament points; 2) if tied for #1, one-game playoff; 3) head-to-head record; 4) head-to-head point differential; 5) overall point differential
(H) Hosts

==== Cumulative standings ====
No other team had a better cumulative record than the two pennant winners, so playoff for the Finals berth was not played.

Pos	Team	W	L	Pts	Qualification
1	PHCR Altas	7	3	17	Finals
2	San Sebastian Stags	6	4	16	Finals
3	Letran Knights	6	4	16	
4	Mapúa Cardinals (H)	5	5	15	
5	JRC Heavy Bombers	3	7	13	
6	San Beda Red Lions	3	7	13	

Rules for classification: 1) tournament points; 2) head-to-head record; 3) head-to-head point differential; 4) overall point differential
(H) Hosts

The Altas of Perpetual Help College of Rizal took the first round flag with a 4-1 won-loss card following Letran's 97-106 loss to San Sebastian on August 26, in which the defending champion Stags tied the Knights with three wins and two losses.

The second round of the tournament had a four-way tie among Perpetual Help College, San Sebastian, Mapua and Letran. The four teams were paired and the winners clash in a playoff to decide the second round champion. Had the Altas won the knockout series, they will automatically be declared champions. It turn out the San Sebastian Stags emerge victorious and captured the second round pennant, thus forge a best-of-three title showdown with the Altas.

=== Finals ===
October

San Sebastian Stags	118–115 (OT)	PHCR Altas

Rizal Memorial Coliseum, Manila

October

San Sebastian Stags	88–95	PHCR Altas

Rizal Memorial Coliseum, Manila

October 19

San Sebastian Stags	102–93	PHCR Altas
San Sebastian wins series 2–1

Rizal Memorial Coliseum, Manila

=== Awards ===
NCAA Season 65 men's basketball champions
San Sebastian Stags
Fourth title, second consecutive title

== See also ==
- UAAP Season 52 men's basketball tournament

Preceded by Season 65 (1988)	NCAA basketball seasons Season 65 (1989)	Succeeded by Season 66 (1990)
