= NCAA Season 58 basketball tournaments =

1982 NCAA season
- Host school: Trinity College of Quezon City

Men's tournament
- Champions: Letran Knights
- First runner-up: Trinity Stallions
- Winning coach: Larry Albano

The 1982 NCAA basketball tournament was the 58th season in the Philippine National Collegiate Athletic Association (NCAA). The Letran Knights regains the championship in the Seniors division.

== Men's tournament ==
=== Squads ===
| Letran | Trinity | Mapua | San Beda | Jose Rizal College | San Sebastian |
|---|---|---|---|---|---|
| Robert Agner | Peter Aguilar | Bobby Andres | Mukesh Advani | Gervacio Acosta | Jesus Buenavente |
| Romeo Ang | Bonifacio Baluyot | Edmundo Baculi | Enrico Banal | Raymond Cañalita | Enrique Cadarao |
| Monty Aquino | Allan Borromeo | Aser Bass | Leonardo Cruel | Angelito Elviña | Hernani Demigillo |
| Elmer Bolabola | Simeon Borromeo | Arnold Espino | John Lucas | Oscar Espinosa | Joseph Dy |
| Tony Cabatana | Danny Dagle | Alejandro Graven | Roberto Magalong | Rodolfo Lotuaco | Elmer Esguerra |
| Fortunato Cortez | Tony de Guzman | Felix Javier | Francisco Moncada | Benedicto Secades | Francisco Navarro |
| Jojo Cuison | Wilner Garica | Menardo Jubinal | Jonathan Reyes | Benedicto Tolentino | Mario Nicolas |
| Jerry Gonzales | Elmer Masalunga | Jesus Labrador | Ferdinand Robles | | Rolando Roxas |
| Elmer Latonio | George Padre | Antonio Magpantay | Osmundo Rojales | | Ruben Syquiamsiam |
| Avelino Lim | Reinier Portalayan | Timoteo Paez | Raymund Roxas | | Jose Trinidad |
| Antonio Pujante | Demetrio Portoza | Leo Angelo Pujante | Jose Santos | | Alfredo Villamor |
| Cayetano Salazar | Edgardo Remonte | Gerardo Ramos | Danny Sy | | |
| | | Benjamin Rivera | | | |
| | | Larry Sikat | | | |

=== Elimination round ===
Format:

- Tournament divided into two halves: winners of the two halves dispute the championship in a best-of-3 finals series unless:
  - A team wins both rounds. In that case, the winning team automatically wins the championship.
  - A third team has a better cumulative record than both finalists. In that case, the third team has to win in a playoff against the team that won the second round to face the team that won in the first round in a best-of-3 finals series.

==== First round ====
===== Team standings =====
| Pos | Team | W | L | Pts | Qualification |
|---|---|---|---|---|---|
| 1 | Letran Knights | 4 | 1 | 9 | Finals |
| 2 | Trinity Stallions (H) | 3 | 2 | 8 | |
| 3 | Mapúa Cardinals | 3 | 2 | 8 | |
| 4 | San Beda Red Lions | 2 | 3 | 7 | |
| 5 | JRC Heavy Bombers | 2 | 3 | 7 | |
| 6 | San Sebastian Stags | 1 | 4 | 6 | |

Rules for classification: 1) tournament points; 2) if tied for #1, one-game playoff; 3) head-to-head record; 4) head-to-head point differential; 5) overall point differential
(H) Hosts

===== Results =====
| Team | CSJL | JRC | MIT | SBC | SSCR | TCQC |
|---|---|---|---|---|---|---|
| Letran | | 89–81 | 100–90 | 109–86 | 83–91 | 111–90 |
| JRC | | | 79–82 | 78–70 | 82–76 | 66–74 |
| Mapua | | | | 98–81 | 94–82 | 69–77 |
| San Beda | | | | | 85–76 | 67–64 |
| San Sebastian | | | | | | 68–79 |
| Trinity | | | | | | |

Updated to match(es) played on unknown. Source:
Legend: Blue = left column team win; Red = top row team win.

==== Second round ====
===== Team standings =====
| Pos | Team | W | L | Pts | Qualification |
|---|---|---|---|---|---|
| 1 | Letran Knights | 4 | 1 | 9 | Finals |
| 2 | Trinity Stallions (H) | 3 | 2 | 8 | |
| 3 | Mapúa Cardinals | 3 | 2 | 8 | |
| 4 | San Beda Red Lions | 3 | 2 | 8 | |
| 5 | JRC Heavy Bombers | 1 | 4 | 6 | |
| 6 | San Sebastian Stags | 1 | 4 | 6 | |

Rules for classification: 1) tournament points; 2) if tied for #1, one-game playoff; 3) head-to-head record; 4) head-to-head point differential; 5) overall point differential
(H) Hosts

==== Cumulative standings ====
Letram won both pennants, and was named automatic champions without need for the finals.

| Pos | Team | W | L | Pts | Qualification |
|---|---|---|---|---|---|
| 1 | Letran Knights | 8 | 2 | 18 | Automatic champions (Note: As Letran won both pennants, they were named automatic champions.) |
| 2 | Trinity Stallions (H) | 6 | 4 | 16 | |
| 3 | Mapúa Cardinals | 6 | 4 | 16 | |
| 4 | San Beda Red Lions | 5 | 5 | 15 | |
| 5 | JRC Heavy Bombers | 3 | 7 | 13 | |
| 6 | San Sebastian Stags | 2 | 8 | 12 | |

Rules for classification: 1) tournament points; 2) head-to-head record; 3) head-to-head point differential; 4) overall point differential
(H) Hosts
Notes:

The Letran Knights raced to four wins in the second round and captured the NCAA Seniors crown when deposed champion Mapua beat San Beda, 78-77 on September 11, and ended hopes for the Red Lions to figure in a playoff with the Knights for the second round flag. Letran already clinch the championship even before their last game against Trinity on September 15. The Knights lost their final game to the Stallions, 89-102.

=== Awards ===
NCAA Season 58 men's basketball champions
Letran Knights
Seventh title

| Preceded by Season 57 (1981) | NCAA basketball seasons Season 58 (1982) | Succeeded by Season 59 (1983) |
