= NCAA Season 62 basketball tournaments =

1986 NCAA season
| Men's Finals | G1 | G2 | G3 | Wins |
|---|---|---|---|---|
| Letran Knights | 93 | 77 | 88 | 2 |
| San Sebastian Stags | 86 | 80 | 86 | 1 |
- Duration: October 1986
- Arena(s): Rizal Memorial Coliseum
- Winning coach: Eddie Reyes

The 1986 NCAA basketball tournament was the 62nd season in the Philippine National Collegiate Athletic Association (NCAA). For the fourth time in five years, the Letran Knights have crowned themselves basketball champions in the Seniors division. The Staglets of San Sebastian College beat comebacking San Beda Red Cubs, 2–1, in their own title series for the Junior division championship.

== Men's tournament ==
=== Elimination round ===
Format:

- Tournament divided into two halves: winners of the two halves dispute the championship in a best-of-3 finals series unless:
  - A team wins both rounds. In that case, the winning team automatically wins the championship.
  - A third team has a better cumulative record than both finalists. In that case, the third team has to win in a playoff against the team that won the second round to face the team that won in the first round in a best-of-3 finals series.

==== First round team standings ====
| Team | W | L | Pts. |
|---|---|---|---|
| San Sebastian Stags | 4 | 1 | 9 |
| Letran Knights | 3 | 2 | 8 |
| Mapúa Cardinals | 3 | 2 | 8 |
| PHCR Altas | 3 | 2 | 8 |
| JRC Heavy Bombers | 2 | 3 | 7 |
| San Beda Red Lions | 0 | 5 | 5 |

Qualified to the Finals

==== Second round team standings ====
| Team | W | L | Pts. |
|---|---|---|---|
| Letran Knights | 4 | 1 | 9 |
| PHCR Altas | 4 | 1 | 9 |
| San Sebastian Stags | 3 | 2 | 8 |
| Mapúa Cardinals | | | |
| JRC Heavy Bombers | | | |
| San Beda Red Lions | | | |

Qualified to the Finals

Taking the first round pennant was San Sebastian, losing only to Jose Rizal College, 92–93. The Letran Knights dropped two games in the first round to Mapua, 82–84, and San Sebastian, 75–79, and figured in a three-way tie for second place with Mapua Cardinals and Perpetual Help College.

Sophomore quintet Perpetual Help Altas could have sweep the second round if not for the loss to San Sebastian Stags in their last outing. Letran managed to force a tie for first place with the Atlas and a playoff ensued with the Knights winning comfortably, 100–79, to arrange a championship setto with defending champions San Sebastian for the third time in five years.

Letran showed up with only 10 players. Their 11th man Salvador Ramos was disqualified from playing right from the start of the league after it was found out that he had already graduated.

=== Finals ===
October

| Letran Knights | 93–86 | San Sebastian Stags |
Letran leads series 1–0

Rizal Memorial Coliseum, Manila

October

| Letran Knights | 77–80 | San Sebastian Stags |
Series tied 1–1

Rizal Memorial Coliseum, Manila

October

| Letran Knights | 88–86 | San Sebastian Stags |
Letran wins series 2–1

Rizal Memorial Coliseum, Manila

Letran dictated the tempo early, leading by as many as 13 points in one stage, 46–33. The Knights survived the Stags' spirited rally in the last two minutes to win.

=== Awards ===
NCAA Season 62 men's basketball champions
Letran Knights
Tenth title

== See also ==
- UAAP Season 49 men's basketball tournament

| Preceded by Season 61 (1985) | NCAA basketball seasons Season 62 (1986) | Succeeded by Season 63 (1987) |
