= NCAA Season 68 basketball tournaments =

1992 NCAA season
- Host school: San Sebastian College
Men's Finals	G1	G2	Wins
San Sebastian Stags	91	85	0
Letran Knights	98	94	2
- Duration: October 6–10, 1992
- Arena: Rizal Memorial Coliseum
- Finals MVP: Gilbert Castillo
- Winning coach: Rudy Hines
Juniors' Finals	G1	G2	Wins
San Beda Red Cubs	82	85	2
Mapúa Red Robins	80	71	0
- Duration: October 3–8, 1992
- Arena: Rizal Memorial Coliseum
- Finals MVP: Ralph Emerson Rivera
- Winning coach: Ato Badolato

The 1992 NCAA basketball tournament was the 68th season in the Philippine National Collegiate Athletic Association (NCAA). The season opens on August 1 at the Araneta Coliseum and ended on October 10 with the Letran Knights regaining the title in the Seniors' division and won their 11th NCAA crown.

== Teams ==
Team	School	Men's coach
Letran Knights	Colegio de San Juan de Letran	Rudy Hines
JRC Heavy Bombers	Jose Rizal College	Egay Gomez
Mapúa Cardinals	Mapúa Institute of Technology	Joel Banal
PHCR Altas	Perpetual Help College of Rizal	Abet Gutierrez
San Beda Red Lions	San Beda College	Angel Ascue
San Sebastian Stags	San Sebastian College - Recoletos	Arturo Valenzona

== Men's tournament ==
=== Elimination round ===
Format:

- Tournament divided into two halves: winners of the two halves dispute the championship in a best-of-3 finals series unless:
  - A team wins both rounds. In that case, the winning team automatically wins the championship.
  - A third team has a better cumulative record than both finalists. In that case, the third team has to win in a playoff against the team that won the second round to face the team that won in the first round in a best-of-3 finals series.

==== First round team standings ====
Pos	Team	W	L	Pts	Qualification
1	San Sebastian Stags (H)	4	1	9 (Note: First round pennant playoff: San Sebastian 81–74 Mapúa)	Finals
2	Mapúa Cardinals	4	1	9	
3	Letran Knights	3	2	8	
4	San Beda Red Lions	3	2	8	
5	PHCR Altas	1	4	6	
6	JRC Heavy Bombers	0	5	5	

Rules for classification: 1) tournament points; 2) if tied for #1, one-game playoff; 3) head-to-head record; 4) head-to-head point differential; 5) overall point differential
(H) Hosts

==== Second round team standings ====
Pos	Team	W	L	Pts	Qualification
1	Letran Knights	4	1	9 (Note: Second round pennant playoff: Letran 108–93 San Sebastian)	Finals
2	San Sebastian Stags (H)	4	1	9	
3	Mapúa Cardinals	3	2	8	
4	JRC Heavy Bombers	3	2	8	
5	San Beda Red Lions	1	4	6	
6	PHCR Altas	0	5	5	

Rules for classification: 1) tournament points; 2) if tied for #1, one-game playoff; 3) head-to-head record; 4) head-to-head point differential; 5) overall point differential
(H) Hosts

==== Cumulative standings ====
Pos	Team	W	L	Pts	Qualification
1	San Sebastian Stags (H)	8	2	18	Finals
2	Letran Knights	7	3	17	Finals
3	Mapúa Cardinals	7	3	17	
4	San Beda Red Lions	4	6	14	
5	JRC Heavy Bombers	3	7	13	
6	PHCR Altas	1	9	11	

Rules for classification: 1) tournament points; 2) head-to-head record; 3) head-to-head point differential; 4) overall point differential
(H) Hosts

San Sebastian Stags were on their way to a first round sweep, scoring four straight victories and were leading by 20 points in the second half against Letran, 76-56, in their last assignment in the first round when the Knights rallied back and pulled off a 94-89 comeback victory over the Stags.

San Sebastian clinch the first round pennant, defeating Mapua Cardinals, 81-74, in their winner-take-all showdown on August 29 at the Rizal Coliseum.

Letran captured the second round flag, following a 108-93 victory over first round winner San Sebastian Stags in their playoff on September 30. The Knights forge a best-of-three showdown with the Stags for the Senior basketball title.

=== Finals ===
==== Game 1 ====
October 6

San Sebastian Stags	91–98	Letran Knights

Rizal Memorial Coliseum, Manila

October 10

San Sebastian Stags	85–94	Letran Knights
Letran wins series 2–0

Rizal Memorial Coliseum, Manila

- Finals Most Valuable Player: Gilbert Castillo (Letran Knights)

In Game 1, Ronald Peña pumped in five of his 15 points in an 11-2 Letran run midway in the final half and another five at the height of San Sebastian rally late in the contest to put the Knights ahead, 87-77, with 2:25 remaining.

Ronald Peña, chosen the season's Most Valuable Player, topscored for the Knights with 22 points, and Gilbert Castillo added 19. From a 77-all deadlock, the game broke wide open on a 15-5 run by the Knights, engineered by Peña. A power outage hit the area with 42 seconds left. Letran students and supporters pour into the court for an early celebration while waiting for the lights to be restored.

=== Awards ===
NCAA Season 68 men's basketball champions
Letran Knights
12th title

- Most Valuable Player: Ronald Peña (Letran Knights)

== Juniors' tournament ==
=== Elimination round ===
The San Beda Red Cubs won the first round pennant by winning all of the games in the first round. The Mapúa Red Robins matched that in the second round, to set up a Finals meeting between the two teams.

=== Finals ===
October 3

San Beda Red Cubs	85–80	Mapúa Red Robins

Rizal Memorial Coliseum, Manila

October 8

San Beda Red Cubs	82–71	Mapúa Red Robins
San Beda wins series 2–0

Rizal Memorial Coliseum, Manila

- Finals Most Valuable Player: Ralph Emerson Rivera (San Beda Red Lions)

Ralph Emerson Rivera, who had scored 17 points to lead San Beda, intercepted a pass from Henry Ong to Dennis Madrid to deny the Red Robins the comeback in Game 1. Late in Game 2, San Beda's Rensy Bajar collided with Madrid, causing the injuring the latter's hip, making him sit out the last 5 minutes of the game. Rivera scored 20 points to lead all scorers.

=== Awards ===
NCAA Season 68 juniors' basketball champions
San Beda Red Cubs
Ninth title, second consecutive title

== See also ==
- UAAP Season 55 men's basketball tournament

Preceded by Season 67 (1991)	NCAA basketball seasons Season 68 (1992)	Succeeded by Season 69 (1993)
