= NCAA Season 66 basketball tournaments =

1990 NCAA season
- Host school: Perpetual Help College of Rizal
Men's Finals	G1	G2	Wins
Mapúa Cardinals	96	97	2
San Sebastian Stags	87	92	0
- Duration: October 7–10, 1990
- Arena(s): Rizal Memorial Coliseum
- Winning coach: Joel Banal

Juniors' tournament
- Champions: Letran Squires
- First runner-up: San Beda Red Cubs
- Winning coach: Mollet Pineda

The 1990 NCAA basketball tournament was the 66th season in the Philippine National Collegiate Athletic Association (NCAA). The season started on August 5 at the Ninoy Aquino Stadium and ended with the Mapua Cardinals breaking the 16-year cycle and won the seniors crown, dethroning the defending champion San Sebastian Stags.

== Men's tournament ==
=== Elimination round ===
Format:

- Tournament divided into two halves: winners of the two halves dispute the championship in a best-of-3 finals series unless:
  - A team wins both rounds. In that case, the winning team automatically wins the championship.
  - A third team has a better cumulative record than both finalists. In that case, the third team has to win in a playoff against the team that won the second round to face the team that won in the first round in a best-of-3 finals series.

==== First round team standings ====
Team	W	L	Pts.
Mapúa Cardinals	4	1	9
Letran Knights	4	1	9
San Sebastian Stags	4	1	9
PHCR Altas*	1	3	
San Beda Red Lions*	0	3	
JRC Heavy Bombers*	0	4	

Season host is boldfaced.

Qualified to the Finals

==== Second round team standings ====
Team	W	L	Pts.
San Sebastian Stags	5	0	10
Mapúa Cardinals	4	1	9
San Beda Red Lions	2	3	7
Letran Knights	2	3	7
JRC Heavy Bombers	2	3	7
PHCR Altas	0	5	5

Season host is boldfaced.

Qualified to the Finals

^{Notes: Results of the first round match between San Beda and Perpetual Help and the San Beda vs Jose Rizal College are not yet found}

Defending champion San Sebastian, Letran and Mapua ended the first round with identical 4-win, 1-loss card. The Cardinals nip the SSC Stags, 98–97, in the first of the two playoffs to determined the winner of the first round flag. Mapua clinch the first round championship by exacting revenge over Letran, 111–105 on September 4. The Knights gave the Cardinals their only loss in the first round via a 95–72 victory on opening day.

Mapua Cardinals was on a verge of a two-round sweep and an outright title after scoring four straight victories in the second round. They lost to fellow unbeaten San Sebastian Stags, 84–92, in their final outing. The Stags captured the second round championship by completing a five-game sweep, thus arranging a best-of-three title playoffs with the Cardinals.

=== Finals ===
October 7

**Mapúa Cardinals**	**96**–87	San Sebastian Stags

Rizal Memorial Coliseum, Manila

October 10

**Mapúa Cardinals**	**97**–92	San Sebastian Stags
**Mapua wins series, 2-0**

Rizal Memorial Coliseum, Manila

=== Awards ===
NCAA Season 66 men's basketball champions
Mapúa Cardinals
Fourth title

== Juniors' tournament ==
=== Second round team standings ===
Team	W	L	Pts.
Letran Squires	5	0	10
San Beda Red Cubs	4	1	9
JRC Light Bombers	3	2	8
San Sebastian Staglets	1	3	
Mapua Red Robins	1	3	
PHCR Bantams	0	5	5

Letran Squires completed a two-round sweep in winning back the Junior title they last held in 1985. The Squires were first round winner when JRC Light Bombers were stripped of the pennant for fielding an ineligible player.

=== Awards ===
NCAA Season 66 juniors' basketball champions
Letran Squires
11th title

== See also ==
- UAAP Season 53 men's basketball tournament

Preceded by Season 65 (1989)	NCAA basketball seasons Season 66 (1990)	Succeeded by Season 67 (1991)
