= NCAA Season 85 basketball tournaments =

NCAA Season 85
- Winning Drive at 85
- Host school: San Beda College
Men's Finals	G1 (2OT)	G2	Wins
San Beda Red Lions	68	61	0
San Sebastian Stags	72	76	2
- Duration: October 22–24, 2009
- Arena(s): Araneta Coliseum
- Finals MVP: Jimbo Aquino
- Winning coach: Ato Agustin (1st title)
- Semifinalists: JRU Heavy Bombers; Letran Knights
- TV network(s): Studio 23, The Filipino Channel, Balls HD
Juniors' Finals	G1	G2	G3	Wins
San Beda Red Cubs	98	80	86	2
Letran Squires	75	83	75	1
- Duration: October 23–29, 2009
- Arena(s): Araneta Coliseum (Games 1 & 2); Filoil Flying V Arena (Game 3)
- Finals MVP: Baser Amer
- Winning coach: Ato Badolato (16th title)
- Semifinalists: San Sebastian Staglets; JRU Light Bombers
- TV network(s): Studio 23, The Filipino Channel, Balls HD

The basketball tournaments of NCAA Season 85 refers to the basketball events of the Philippine National Collegiate Athletic Association (NCAA)'s 2009–10 season. This is the first season without the PCU Dolphins who have taken an indefinite leave of absence after several of their juniors' division players were found to have used falsified documents to enter the school. Also, three guest teams will take part in the basketball events with all three eligible to win championships.

The games began on June 27 at the Araneta Coliseum with an opening ceremony led by San Beda, with a keynote speech by United States Ambassador to the Philippines Kristie Kenney, culminating with a tripleheader with season host San Beda Red Lions routing the Mapua Cardinals 82–55 in the opening game. The four-time juniors champion San Sebastian Staglets will also begin their title defense, with a majority of the games being held at the Filoil Flying V Arena in San Juan.

In the men's division, the San Sebastian Stags had an all-time league-best 15-game winning streak, ending on their second-round game against the Letran Knights. The Stags ended the elimination round tied with the San Beda Red Lions for first, who beat them in the elimination round finale. The Red Lions defeated the Stags in the playoff for the #1 seed, and they were beaten anew by the third seed JRU Heavy Bombers in the first game of the semifinals. The Stags beat the Heavy Bombers in Game 2 to meet the Red Lions in the Finals who had previously beaten the Knights in their own semifinals. Game 1 of the Finals went into two overtimes, with the Stags eking out a 4-point triumph. The Red Lions, who led for majority of the game, faltered in the fourth quarter of Game 2 to allow the Stags to clinch their first title since 2002. Jimbo Aquino of San Sebastian was named Finals Most Valuable Player (MVP) in his final playing year.

In the juniors' division, the Letran Squires had a 17-game winning streak, only for them to be beaten by the San Beda Red Cubs in the last game of the elimination round. The Red Cubs blew out the Squires in the playoff for #1, but both teams did not need their twice-to-beat advantage to eliminate the JRU Light Bombers and the San Sebastian Staglets respectively in the semifinals. In Game 1 of the Finals, San Beda blew out Letran for the second game in a row, but the Squires outlasted the Red Cubs in Game 2 via a late three-pointer to force Game 3. In the deciding game, San Beda pulled away late in the fourth quarter after Letran cut down the 15-point lead to two points to give retiring coach Ato Badolato his 15th juniors' championship. The Squires suffered their third consecutive Finals defeat; they previously lost twice to the Staglets prior losing to the Red Cubs. Baser Amer was awarded the Finals MVP award.

JRU players John Wilson and Louie Vigil were awarded Most Valuable Player honors for the men's and juniors' divisions respectively. American Sudan Daniel and Baser Amer both from San Beda were named men's and juniors' Rookies of the Year.

== Men's tournament ==
=== Teams ===
Team	College	Coach
AUF Great Danes	Angeles University Foundation (AUF)	(Philippines) Eric Gascon
Arellano Chiefs	Arellano University (AU)	(Philippines) Junjie Ablan
Letran Knights	Colegio de San Juan de Letran (CSJL)	(Philippines) Louie Alas
Benilde Blazers	De La Salle–College of Saint Benilde (CSB)	(Philippines) Richard del Rosario
EAC Generals	Emilio Aguinaldo College (EAC)	(Philippines) Nomar Isla
JRU Heavy Bombers	José Rizal University (JRU)	(Philippines) Ariel Vanguardia
Mapúa Cardinals	Mapúa Institute of Technology (MIT)	(Philippines) Chito Victolero
San Beda Red Lions	San Beda College (SBC)	(Philippines) Frankie Lim
San Sebastian Stags	San Sebastian College – Recoletos (SSC-R)	(Philippines) Ato Agustin
Perpetual Altas	University of Perpetual Help System DALTA (UPHSD)	(Philippines) Boris Aldeguer

==== Changes from last season ====
Guest teams:

- AUF Great Danes
- Arellano Chiefs
- EAC Generals

Departed team:

- PCU Dolphins (took an indefinite leave of absence)

=== Preseason ===
The league announced that the games will be held at the Filoil Flying V Arena for most games and the Araneta Coliseum for bigger games, while the other sports will be held at the Rizal Memorial Sports Complex and the PhilSports Complex via a partnership with the Philippine Sports Commission. The NCAA originally wanted to play in the Rizal Memorial Coliseum "But it's still under repair so maybe next year," management committee chairman Jose Mari Lacson of San Beda College said.

Former UST Growling Tigers head coach Aric del Rosario was appointed as the league commissioner who immediately warning players not to commit dangerous fouls, and the more strict enforcement of the handcheck foul. Another new rule is that there would now be two people on the bench allowed to stand up instead of only one previously; del Rosario said that the head coach and his head assistant are now allowed to stand up. If a third person is caught standing up, a warning will be issued, and on the second violation, a technical foul will be charged on the team.

Furthermore, a new system of filing game protests concerning results, eligibility of players and the like will be used:

- No more complaints will be heard against a team that has already won the championship.
- A team must file a protest within 48 hours to contest the result of a match along with a bond of P5,000 which must be submitted to the management committee of the league.
- On eligibility complaints, a team must submit its written complaint the day after the first round of eliminations. The complaint will require a bond of P10,000.

Coaching changes
Team	Old coach	Reason	New coach
San Sebastian Stags	(Philippines) Jorge Gallent	Resignation	(Philippines) Ato Agustin
Benilde Blazers	(Philippines) Gee Abanilla	On loan to the national team	(Philippines) Richard del Rosario
Mapua Cardinals	(Philippines) Leo Isaac*	Resignation	(Philippines) Chito Victolero
Perpetual Altas	(Philippines) Bai Cristobal	Mutual consent	(Philippines) Boris Aldeguer
Arellano Chiefs	(Philippines) Leo Isaac*	Elevated as athletic director	(Philippines) Junjie Ablan

- Prior to Arellano's admission as a guest team, Isaac was head coach for both Mapua and Arellano since NCAA and NCRAA seasons are held at different times of the year.

=== Elimination round ===
==== Team standings ====
Pos	Team	W	L	PCT	GB	Qualification
1	San Beda Red Lions (H)	16	2	.889 (Note: First-seed playoff: San Beda 71–65 San Sebastian)	—	Twice-to-beat in the semifinals
2	San Sebastian Stags	16	2	.889	—	Twice-to-beat in the semifinals
3	JRU Heavy Bombers	15	3	.833	1	Twice-to-win in the semifinals
4	Letran Knights	12	6	.667	4	Twice-to-win in the semifinals
5	Arellano Chiefs (G)	8	10	.444	8	
6	EAC Generals (G)	6	12	.333 (Note: Head-to-head record: EAC 3–1, Mapúa 2–2, Benilde 1–3)	10	
7	Mapúa Cardinals	6	12	.333	10	
8	Benilde Blazers	6	12	.333	10	
9	Perpetual Altas	3	15	.167	13	
10	AUF Great Danes (G)	2	16	.111	14	

Source: ABS-CBN Sports
Rules for classification: 1) winning percentage; 2) if tied for top 4, one-game playoff; 3) head-to-head record; 4) overall point differential
(G) Guests; (H) Hosts

==== Match-up results ====
	Round 1									Round 2								
Team ╲ Game	1	2	3	4	5	6	7	8	9	10	11	12	13	14	15	16	17	18
AUF	CSB school colors	EAC school colors	Mapua school colors	UPHD school colors	JRU school colors	SSC-R school colors	Letran school colors	San Beda school colors	Arellano school colors	SSC-R school colors	Arellano school colors	San Beda school colors	Letran school colors	EAC school colors	CSB school colors	JRU school colors	Mapua school colors	UPHD school colors
Arellano	EAC school colors	Letran school colors	San Beda school colors	JRU school colors	SSC-R school colors	CSB school colors	UPHD school colors	AUF school colors	Mapua school colors	CSB school colors	AUF school colors	Letran school colors	JRU school colors	San Beda school colors	Mapua school colors	SSC-R school colors	UPHD school colors	EAC school colors
Letran	JRU school colors	Arellano school colors	UPHD school colors	Mapua school colors	CSB school colors	San Beda school colors	AUF school colors	EAC school colors	SSC-R school colors	EAC school colors	Mapua school colors	Arellano school colors	CSB school colors	AUF school colors	JRU school colors	UPHD school colors	SSC-R school colors	San Beda school colors
Benilde	AUF school colors	Mapua school colors	SSC-R school colors	San Beda school colors	Letran school colors	UPHD school colors	EAC school colors	Arellano school colors	JRU school colors	Arellano school colors	JRU school colors	Letran school colors	EAC school colors	SSC-R school colors	AUF school colors	San Beda school colors	UPHD school colors	Mapua school colors
EAC	Arellano school colors	AUF school colors	JRU school colors	SSC-R school colors	Mapua school colors	CSB school colors	San Beda school colors	Letran school colors	UPHD school colors	Letran school colors	San Beda school colors	UPHD school colors	SSC-R school colors	CSB school colors	AUF school colors	Mapua school colors	Arellano school colors	JRU school colors
JRU	Letran school colors	UPHD school colors	EAC school colors	Arellano school colors	AUF school colors	Mapua school colors	SSC-R school colors	CSB school colors	San Beda school colors	UPHD school colors	CSB school colors	Mapua school colors	Arellano school colors	Letran school colors	San Beda school colors	AUF school colors	SSC-R school colors	EAC school colors
Mapúa	San Beda school colors	CSB school colors	AUF school colors	Letran school colors	EAC school colors	JRU school colors	UPHD school colors	SSC-R school colors	Arellano school colors	San Beda school colors	Letran school colors	JRU school colors	SSC-R school colors	UPHD school colors	Arellano school colors	EAC school colors	AUF school colors	CSB school colors
San Beda	Mapua school colors	SSC-R school colors	Arellano school colors	CSB school colors	UPHD school colors	Letran school colors	EAC school colors	AUF school colors	JRU school colors	Mapua school colors	EAC school colors	AUF school colors	UPHD school colors	Arellano school colors	JRU school colors	CSB school colors	Letran school colors	SSC-R school colors
San Sebastian	UPHD school colors	San Beda school colors	CSB school colors	EAC school colors	Arellano school colors	AUF school colors	JRU school colors	Mapua school colors	Letran school colors	AUF school colors	UPHD school colors	EAC school colors	Mapua school colors	CSB school colors	AUF school colors	Letran school colors	JRU school colors	San Beda school colors
Perpetual	SSC-R school colors	JRU school colors	Letran school colors	AUF school colors	San Beda school colors	CSB school colors	Mapua school colors	Arellano school colors	EAC school colors	JRU school colors	SSC-R school colors	EAC school colors	San Beda school colors	Mapua school colors	Letran school colors	Arellano school colors	AUF school colors	CSB school colors

= Win; = OT win; = Loss; = OT loss

==== Scores ====
Team	AUF	AU	CSJL	CSB	EAC	JRU	MIT	SBC	SSC-R	UPHSD
AUF Great Danes		77–96	64–94	76–87	86–74	52–83	63–101	56–89	65–97	84–92
Arellano Chiefs	84–69		81–73	107–117***	80–62	83–88	76–73	74–102	49–80	85–70
Letran Knights	100–83	89–85		86–69	85–84*	66–69	51–73	74–79	74–77	73–68
Benilde Blazers	74–61	72–82	54–69		73–78	63–73	74–70	66–86	62–75	64–63
EAC Generals	87–73	86–81	66–92	83–70		69–83	80–69	71–95	73–87	79–86
JRU Heavy Bombers	85–71	88–70	84–66	95–86	97–61		83–78	81–96	76–91	83–58
Mapúa Cardinals	91–77	74–59	65–70	86–56	87–69	59–72		52–85	74–77	71–72
San Beda Red Lions	113–79	83–72	76–64	66–54	94–63	64–77	84–75		77–83	98–65
San Sebastian Stags	81–69	100–66	63–80	94–61	109–63	84–78	101–65	67–71		76–64
Perpetual Altas	66–73	70–75	60–80	59–67	63–68	68–82	56–62	69–96	70–80	

Legend: Blue = left column team win; Red = top row team win.
Matches with lighter background shading were decided after overtime.

==== First round ====
===== June–July =====
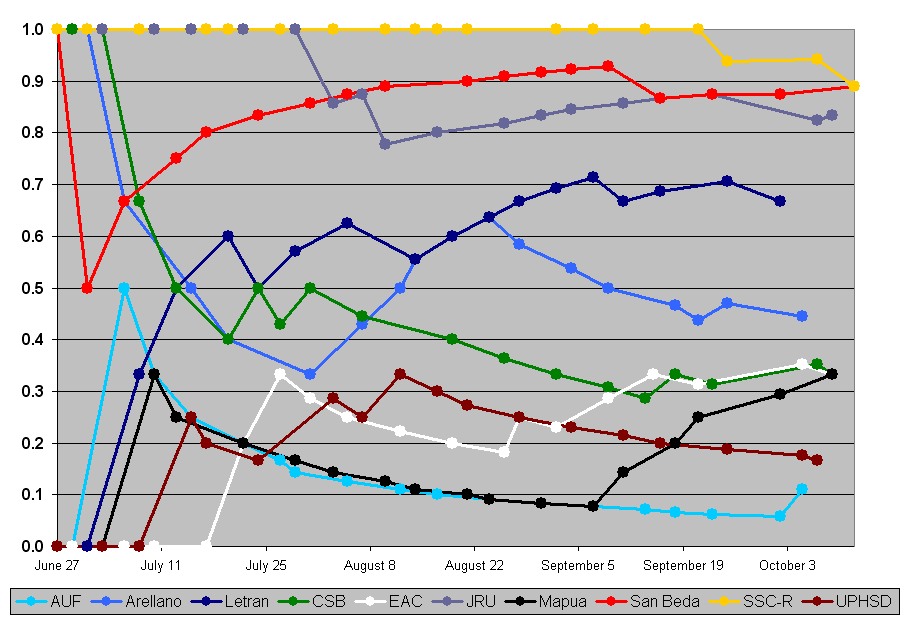
Team standings progression.

With a total of ten teams this season, the traditional quadruple–header at the Araneta Coliseum would not be held but instead the opening Saturday would consist of three games: in the traditional champion vs. host opening game, season host and defending champion San Beda blew out the 2008 hosts Mapua 85–52, JRU overcame a late surge by Letran by winning 69–66, and San Sebastian defeated UPHSD in the nightcap, 76–64.

With the Filoil Flying V Arena in San Juan hosting the rest of the elimination round in the second day, CSB overcame AUF's late surge, and Arellano blew out fellow hosts EAC. In a day of upsets, San Sebastian gave San Beda its worst start in their last four seasons, while guests Arellano defeated Letran anew, placing the Knights at the bottom of the standings. JRU and Benilde remained unbeaten, winning against UPHSD and Mapua respectively to join Arellano and San Sebastian at the top of the standings with a 2–0 slate at the end of the first week of competition.

San Beda dealt Arellano their first loss at the start of week 2, with the Great Danes winning their first game against fellow guest school EAC. In a battle of winless teams, Letran rallied from behind, but this time won against UPHSD, and in the battle of undefeated teams, San Sebastian pulled away at the second half to beat CSB. In Friday's blowout games, Mapua notched their first win against AUF, and JRU kept up with San Sebastian with a trashing of EAC.

In week three, San Beda blew out their opponents: a 20–point drubbing of Benilde, and a 33–point massacre of UPHSD. JRU and San Sebastian continued their unbeaten runs with double–digit wins over guest teams Arellano and EAC respectively. The other guest team, AUF, also suffered a double–digit loss against UPHSD, while Letran won the Battle of Intramuros emphatically with a 22–point blowout against Mapua.

San Sebastian and JRU continued their unbeaten runs; the Stags defeated the Chiefs, and the Heavy Bombers blowing out the Great Danes. The Generals clinched their first win in the league with a victory over Mapua, while the Blazers escaped with a one–point win over the Altas. Prior to the CSB-UPHSD game, San Beda and Letran faced off with the Red Lions winning by five points, but that is before Letran's Kris Alas pushed Sudan Daniel, that started a free-for-all; Letran's Jaypee Belencion confronted fans at the stands, and Kevin's father Louie Alas, Letran's head coach, had to shield his wife from debris being pelted on the court.

In the end, Kris Alas and Belencion were suspended, the former by one game and the latter by three games, while Louie Alas, his brother and assistant coach of Letran Mel, his son Keven, and Daniels were given stern warnings by the Management Committee (MANCOM).

The CSB vs. EAC game would devolve into another physical game with several Blazers figuring in a bench-clearing incident; despite CSB's Jeff Morial having 32 points, the Generals notched another win, marking their first winning streak in the NCAA. Meanwhile, San Sebastian extended their winning streak to six with another blowout win, this time against AUF, but not before AUF's Chuck Gomez threw a punch to the opponent. As a result, the MANCOM suspended CSB's Chuck Dalanon and Jan Tan, and Gomez for one game.

JRU matched San Sebastian with a win against Mapua, while Letran rebounded with a win against AUF. In a game that needed three overtimes to finish, CSB thwarted off Arellano by ten points, after Morial sank in 31 points, and hitting crucial three–pointers. Morial converted two three-pointers in the end of regulation to force the first overtime, then another to extend the game into the third overtime, and the last putting away the Chiefs for good. Despite scoring 29 points, mostly in the first half, AU's Gio Ciriacruz fouled out late in the fourth quarter, which started disqualifications of five other Chiefs. Meanwhile, San Beda held off EAC to keep pace with the Stags and the Heavy Bombers at the top.

===== August =====
In a meeting of the two 6–0 teams, the Stags won emphatically over JRU, although the Bombers rebounded with a win over CSB later in the week. Perpetual Help won against Mapua, but before losing to the Chiefs, while San Beda and Letran held off separate opponents, with the Knights needing an extra period to ward off the Generals.

San Beda and JRU ended their first round with a rematch of last year's Finals series in which the Red Lions won. Although both teams sported 7–1 cards, the Heavy Bombers faltered for the second consecutive big game anew, losing the Red Lions to close out their first round campaign on a losing note. Meanwhile, San Sebastian was taken by Mapua to the limit before losing by three points, to set up an anticipated game against arch rival Letran at the first round finale. The Cardinals themselves ended the first round on a 6-game losing streak, after falling to the Arellano Chiefs who closed out with their own 4-game winning streak; prior to their Mapua win, the Chiefs also won against cellar-dweller AUF. Perpetual Help gave EAC their second 4-game losing streak with an 86–79 win.

In the first round finale, Letran led for majority of the game, even by as much as ten at halftime, before the Stags staged a third quarter rally to lead by double digits. The Knights clawed through, and had a chance to extend the game into overtime, but Kevin Alas' off-balanced three-pointer rattled in and out of the rim as time expired to give San Sebastian their first first round sweep since their 1997 championship run.

==== Second round ====
===== August =====
San Sebastian extended their winning streak to 10 with a rather unexpected 12-point win against AUF; as JRU rebounded with a win against Perpetual Help. Letran and Arellano both won their respective first second-round games against EAC and CSB respectively, while San Beda outlasted Mapua to extend their own winning streak to eight, and lengthen Mapua's losing streak to seven. San Sebastian added to UPHSD's woes as they gave the Altas a 0–2 second round record.

Letran and Arellano remained locked at fourth with wins against Mapua and AUF; Letran's win over Mapua was their first second round win in eight seasons against their Intramuros neighbors. San Beda and JRU also had easy wins against EAC and CSB to remain undefeated in the second round. Emilio Aguinaldo College would notch their first win the second round with a thriller over Perpetual Help, and RJ Jazul saved the Knights from a 0–2 season sweep against Arellano with a clutch three–pointer to break Letran and Arellano's tie at fourth place.

San Beda and JRU still maintained the second and third places in the team standings with easy wins against doormats Angeles University Foundation and Mapua; both losing schools were eliminated from semifinals contention.

===== September =====
The trend of the top four teams beating the bottom six continued with San Sebastian and Letran winning over their opponents, with both teams settling for blowout wins against EAC and CSB respectively, and San Sebastian clinching the first semifinal ticket. San Beda and JRU ended the week how it started, with easy wins against Perpetual Help and Arellano respectively, giving the two teams tickets to the semifinals.

AUF surprisingly hung tough against Letran in the first three quarters but the Knights pulled away at the fourth quarter to cement their hold at fourth-place. Meanwhile, San Sebastian extend their winning streak to thirteen games with another blowout win against Mapua. EAC denied CSB of a win against the guest team, denying the Blazers for the seventh consecutive year a Final Four berth. Meanwhile, San Beda gave Arellano's Final Four hopes in peril with a 9-point win. In the Friday games, Mapua broke their 10-game losing streak with a spirited win against Perpetual Help, and JRU's defense held up against Letran for a blowout win against the Knights to score a 5–0 second round record. Letran's loss meant that they won't be able to clinch the twice-to-beat advantage in the semifinals, leaving San Sebastian, San Beda and JRU the only teams in contention for the coveted advantage.

San Sebastian tied the record set by the San Beda Red Lions in the 2006 season, with 14 consecutive wins with a win against St. Benilde. EAC avenged their first round loss against AUF with a double-digit win, with Letran had another fourth quarter run to pull away against UPHSD in the endgame. The Heavy Bombers finally caught up with the Red Lions, fashioning out a 13-point win thanks to Mark Cagoco's three-point shooting. The win tied the two teams for second place. In the week's last pair of games, Mapua hands Letran the last semifinal berth with a double-digit upset against the Chiefs, while CSB ends their 6-game losing streak with an easy win against AUF.

Mapua continued their end-of-season run, this time outlasting EAC to clinch their third consecutive win, as San Sebastian broke the record for most consecutive wins with a dismantling of the Chiefs, bringing their total wins to 15. JRU and San Beda remained tied for #2 with contrasting wins against AUF and CSB; JRU had to grind it out with AUF which is in a 14-game losing streak, while San Beda had an easier time as a depleted CSB ran out of gas in the fourth quarter. Arellano won to clinch fifth place and the 2009 Philippine Collegiate Championship wildcard entry that goes along with it, against UPHSD.

In the San Sebastian-Letran rivalry game, the Knights employed the full-court press in the opening moments that made the game a low-scoring affair; several technical and unsportsmanlike fouls were called, and the Knights pulled away in the second quarter. The Stags had a rally in the third quarter to bring the lead down to single-digits, but shooting from Smart Gilas mainstays RJ Jazul and Rey Guevarra padded Letran's lead to an insurmountable 15–point lead that gave San Sebastian their first loss in the season.

===== October =====
Tropical Storm Ketsana (local name: Ondoy) struck Metro Manila on September 26 causing massive flooding in Eastern Metro Manila and western Rizal. Due to the flooding, eight men's and juniors' games were rescheduled. With the resumption of games on October 2 a week after the tropical storm hit, games resumed but not after a moment of silence was observed commemorating all victims of the typhoon, including Philippine Basketball Association team Barako Bull Energy Boosters manager and former Letran Squires football player Tony Chua, who died in the height of the storm. San Beda had an easy win against Letran, but not before Letran's Rey Guevarra was injured after he hit San Beda's Sudan Daniel. Guevarra would be ruled out for the rest of the season with an anterior cruciate ligament (ACL) injury. AUF continued with their second round slump, losing to Mapua which has now won four consecutive games.

Perpetual Help continued winless in the second round, this time losing to the Great Danes, which notched their second win after losing 15 consecutive times; EAC beat Arellano to split their elimination round series against each other, with AU ending the elimination round at fifth place. UPHSD ended the second round winless, losing to CSB, which later in the week lost their last game against Mapua. CSB had more wins than their brother school De La Salle Green Archers in the UAAP, although both Lasallian schools were eliminated in their respective leagues. Meanwhile, San Sebastian clinched the twice-to-beat advantage in the semifinals with a win over JRU, which won their last game of the season against EAC with a 36-point rout to end their elimination round campaign with a win; the Generals ended tied for sixth and presumably holds the tiebreakers against Mapua and CSB and can clinch the NCAA's last zonal berth in the 2009 Philippine Collegiate Championship.

In the elimination round finale, San Sebastian was beaten by San Beda in a thrilling finish; with the score tied, a tightly guarded Jimbo Aquino turned over the ball, leading to a wide-open fastbreak lay-up by Bambam Gamalinda to forge a playoff for #1 between the two teams.

=== First seed playoff ===
Studio 23

October 14

San Sebastian Stags	65–71	San Beda Red Lions

Filoil Flying V Arena, San Juan

=== Bracket ===
Semifinals (Top 2 twice-to-beat)
1	San Beda	82
4	Letran	76
2	San Sebastian	65	79
3	JRU	72	64

Finals (Best-of-three playoff)
1	San Beda	68	61
2	San Sebastian	72**	76

*Double overtime

=== Semifinals ===
San Beda and San Sebastian have the twice-to-beat advantage. They only have to win once, while their opponents, twice, to progress.

==== (1) San Beda vs. (4) Letran ====
Studio 23

October 16

San Beda Red Lions	82–76	Letran Knights
San Beda wins series in one game

Filoil Flying V Arena, San Juan

==== (2) San Sebastian vs. (3) JRU ====
Studio 23

October 16

San Sebastian Stags	65–72	JRU Heavy Bombers

Filoil Flying V Arena, San Juan

Studio 23

October 19

San Sebastian Stags	79–64	JRU Heavy Bombers
San Sebastian wins series in two games

Filoil Flying V Arena, San Juan

=== Finals ===
Studio 23

October 22
3:30 p.m.

San Beda Red Lions	68–72 (2OT)	San Sebastian Stags

Araneta Coliseum, Quezon City

Studio 23

October 24
3:30 p.m.

San Beda Red Lions	61–76	San Sebastian Stags
San Sebastian wins series 2–0

Araneta Coliseum, Quezon City

- Finals Most Valuable Player: Jimbo Aquino (San Sebastian Stags)

=== Awards ===
NCAA Season 85 men's basketball champions
San Sebastian Stags
12th title

The winners were:

- Most Valuable Player: John Wilson (JRU Heavy Bombers)
- Rookie of the Year: Sudan Daniel (San Beda Red Lions)
- Mythical Five:
  - RJ Jazul (Letran Knights)
  - John Wilson (JRU Heavy Bombers)
  - Gio Ciriacruz (Arellano Chiefs)
  - Calvin Abueva (San Sebastian Stags)
  - Sudan Daniel (San Beda Red Lions)
- Defensive Player of the Year: Sudan Daniel (San Beda Red Lions)
- Most Improved Player: Jake Pascual (San Beda Red Lions)
- Players of the Week:

Week ending	Name	Team
July 4	(Philippines) Jimbo Aquino	San Sebastian
July 11	(Philippines) John Wilson	JRU Heavy Bombers
July 18	(Philippines) Garvo Lanete	San Beda Red Lions
July 25	(United States) Sudan Daniel	San Beda Red Lions
August 1	(Philippines) Jeff Morial	Benilde Blazers
August 7	(Philippines) Jimbo Aquino	San Sebastian Stags
August 14	(United States) Sudan Daniel	San Beda Red Lions
August 14	(Philippines) Leonard Anquillo	Arellano Chiefs
August 21	(Philippines) Gio Ciriacruz	Arellano Chiefs
August 28	(Philippines) John Wilson	JRU Heavy Bombers
September 4	(Philippines) John Wilson	JRU Heavy Bombers
September 11	(Philippines) John Lopez	JRU Heavy Bombers
September 18	(Philippines) Mark Cagoco	JRU Heavy Bombers
September 25	(Philippines) Rey Guevarra (Philippines) RJ Jazul	Letran Knights; Letran Knights
October 9	(Philippines) Jimbo Aquino	San Sebastian Stags
October 14	(Philippines) Borgie Hermida	San Beda Red Lions

=== Controversies ===
==== Non-coverage controversy ====
Previously, only the Wednesday and Friday pre-Final Four games, including the opening ceremonies were aired on Studio 23. But beginning this season, all NCAA games are seen live on Monday, Wednesday and Friday, with an HD simulcast on Balls. However, on July 27, 2009, ABS-CBN, through UHF channel Studio 23 did not air the scheduled NCAA games to give way for the State of the Nation Address of President Gloria Macapagal Arroyo. Likewise, on August 5, 2009, the scheduled NCAA games were not aired live to give way to former President Corazon Aquino's funeral. The snub disappointed the NCAA fans and even the school representatives. This was in stark contrast to Studio 23's coverage of the UAAP games, where all of its games are aired. As a result, they are now in the process of exploring different options in considering a new broadcast partner.

== Juniors' tournament ==
Games will begin on June 28 at the San Juan Gym, while all remaining elimination round games will be held at the Filoil Flying V Arena in San Juan, with two rescheduled games held at the Ynares Sports Arena in Pasig.

=== Elimination round ===
JRU Light Bomber Joshua Saret broke the record established for fellow Light Bomber Keith Agovida last year by scoring 89 points in a 171–43 rout of the AUF Baby Danes.

==== Team standings ====
Pos	Team	W	L	PCT	GB	Qualification
1	San Beda Red Cubs (H)	17	1	.944 (Note: First-seed playoff: San Beda 91–77 Letran)	—	Twice-to-beat in the semifinals
2	Letran Squires	17	1	.944	—	Twice-to-beat in the semifinals
3	San Sebastian Staglets	13	5	.722	4	Twice-to-win in the semifinals
4	JRU Light Bombers	11	7	.611 (Note: Fourth-seed playoff: JRU 83–77 Perpetual)	6	Twice-to-win in the semifinals
5	Perpetual Junior Altas	11	7	.611	6	
6	La Salle Green Hills Greenies	8	10	.444	9	
7	Mapúa Red Robins	5	13	.278 (Note: Head-to-head point record: Malayan 1–1 Arellano (Malayan +3))	12	
8	Arellano Braves (G)	5	13	.278	12	
9	EAC–ICA Brigadiers (G)	3	15	.167	14	
10	AUF Baby Danes (G)	0	18	.000	17	

Source: ABS-CBN Sports
Rules for classification: 1) winning percentage; 2) if tied for top 4, one-game playoff; 3) head-to-head record; 5) overall point differential
(G) Guests; (H) Hosts

==== Schedule ====
	Round 1									Round 2								
Team ╲ Game	1	2	3	4	5	6	7	8	9	10	11	12	13	14	15	16	17	18
AUF	CSB school colors	EAC school colors	Mapua school colors	UPHD school colors	JRU school colors	SSC-R school colors	Letran school colors	San Beda school colors	Arellano school colors	SSC-R school colors	Arellano school colors	San Beda school colors	Letran school colors	EAC school colors	CSB school colors	JRU school colors	Mapua school colors	UPHD school colors
Arellano	EAC school colors	Letran school colors	San Beda school colors	JRU school colors	SSC-R school colors	CSB school colors	UPHD school colors	AUF school colors	Mapua school colors	CSB school colors	AUF school colors	Letran school colors	JRU school colors	San Beda school colors	Mapua school colors	SSC-R school colors	UPHD school colors	EAC school colors
Letran	JRU school colors	Arellano school colors	UPHD school colors	Mapua school colors	CSB school colors	San Beda school colors	AUF school colors	EAC school colors	SSC-R school colors	EAC school colors	Mapua school colors	Arellano school colors	CSB school colors	AUF school colors	JRU school colors	UPHD school colors	SSC-R school colors	San Beda school colors
EAC–ICA	Arellano school colors	AUF school colors	JRU school colors	SSC-R school colors	Mapua school colors	CSB school colors	San Beda school colors	Letran school colors	UPHD school colors	Letran school colors	San Beda school colors	UPHD school colors	SSC-R school colors	CSB school colors	AUF school colors	Mapua school colors	Arellano school colors	JRU school colors
JRU	Letran school colors	UPHD school colors	EAC school colors	Arellano school colors	AUF school colors	Mapua school colors	SSC-R school colors	CSB school colors	San Beda school colors	UPHD school colors	CSB school colors	Mapua school colors	Arellano school colors	Letran school colors	San Beda school colors	AUF school colors	SSC-R school colors	EAC school colors
LSGH	AUF school colors	Mapua school colors	SSC-R school colors	San Beda school colors	Letran school colors	UPHD school colors	EAC school colors	Arellano school colors	JRU school colors	Arellano school colors	JRU school colors	Letran school colors	EAC school colors	SSC-R school colors	AUF school colors	San Beda school colors	UPHD school colors	Mapua school colors
Malayan	San Beda school colors	CSB school colors	AUF school colors	Letran school colors	EAC school colors	JRU school colors	UPHD school colors	SSC-R school colors	Arellano school colors	San Beda school colors	Letran school colors	JRU school colors	SSC-R school colors	UPHD school colors	Arellano school colors	EAC school colors	AUF school colors	CSB school colors
San Beda	Mapua school colors	SSC-R school colors	Arellano school colors	CSB school colors	UPHD school colors	Letran school colors	EAC school colors	AUF school colors	JRU school colors	Mapua school colors	EAC school colors	AUF school colors	UPHD school colors	Arellano school colors	JRU school colors	CSB school colors	Letran school colors	SSC-R school colors
San Sebastian	UPHD school colors	San Beda school colors	CSB school colors	EAC school colors	Arellano school colors	AUF school colors	JRU school colors	Mapua school colors	Letran school colors	AUF school colors	UPHD school colors	EAC school colors	Mapua school colors	CSB school colors	AUF school colors	Letran school colors	JRU school colors	San Beda school colors
Perpetual	SSC-R school colors	JRU school colors	Letran school colors	AUF school colors	San Beda school colors	CSB school colors	Mapua school colors	Arellano school colors	EAC school colors	JRU school colors	SSC-R school colors	EAC school colors	San Beda school colors	Mapua school colors	Letran school colors	Arellano school colors	AUF school colors	CSB school colors

= Win; = OT win; = Loss; = OT loss

==== Results ====
Team	AUF	AU	CSJL	EAC	JRU	LSGH	MHSS	SBC	SSC-R	UPHSD
AUF Great Danes		44–82	47–121	62–78	43–171	57–106	41–117	39–172	23–113	47–135
Arellano Braves	73–40		76–105	83–61	80–89	65–88	102–86	51–105	63–78	65–101
Letran Squires	153–32	105–74		133–77	95–77	85–75	135–58	99–84	89–79	96–91
EAC–ICA Brigadiers	74–53	59–70	61–125		58–135	67–85	98–93**	52–154	59–117	63–116
JRU Light Bombers	119–31	88–70	93–114	94–45		98–96	114–63	103–111	93–87	101–95
LSGH Greenies	97–26	81–37	63–86	84–52	85–86		99–65	55–108	53–71	94–96*
Malayan Red Robins	87–46	73–54	78–105	93–59	90–79	94–91*		42–122	62–96	89–97
San Beda Red Cubs	168–24	106–48	92–91	121–42	85–63	96–57	100–70		78–53	98–85
San Sebastian Staglets	114–34	91–34	73–81	99–56	66–63	71–66	89–61	80–101		62–60
Perpetual Junior Altas	115–33	99–52	81–88	101–69	109–92	88–64	93–75	69–95	78–91	

Legend: Blue = left column team win; Red = top row team win.
Matches with lighter background shading were decided after overtime.

=== Fourth seed playoff ===
October 14

Perpetual Junior Altas	77–83	JRU Light Bombers

Filoil Flying V Arena, San Juan

=== First seed playoff ===
Studio 23

October 14

Letran Squires	77–91	San Beda Red Cubs

Filoil Flying V Arena, San Juan

=== Bracket ===
Semifinals (Top 2 twice-to-beat)
1	San Beda	90
4	JRU	76
2	Letran	89
3	San Sebastian	84

Finals (Best-of-three playoff)
1	San Beda	98	80	86
2	Letran	75	83	75

=== Semifinals ===
==== (1) San Beda vs. (4) JRU ====
October 16

San Beda Red Cubs	90–76	JRU Light Bombers
San Beda wins series in one game

Filoil Flying V Arena, San Juan

==== (2) Letran vs. (3) San Sebastian ====
October 16

Letran Squires	89–84	San Sebastian Staglets
Letran wins series in one game

Filoil Flying V Arena, San Juan

=== Finals ===
Studio 23

October 23

San Beda Red Cubs	98–75	Letran Squires

Araneta Coliseum, Quezon City

Studio 23

October 26

San Beda Red Cubs	80–83	Letran Squires

Araneta Coliseum, Quezon City

Studio 23

October 29

San Beda Red Cubs	86–75	Letran Squires
San Beda wins series 2–1

Filoil Flying V Arena, San Juan

- Finals Most Valuable Player: Baser Amer (San Beda Red Cubs)

=== Awards ===
NCAA Season 85 juniors' basketball champions
San Beda Red Cubs
16th title

The winners were:

- Most Valuable Player: Louie Vigil (JRU Light Bombers)
- Rookie of the Year: Baser Amer (San Beda Red Cubs)
- Mythical Five:
  - Joshua Saret (JRU Light Bombers)
  - Jarelan Tampus (Letran Squires)
  - Baser Amer (San Beda Red Cubs)
  - Louie Vigil (JRU Light Bombers)
  - Glenn Khobuntin (Letran Squires)
- Defensive Player of the Year: Louie Vigil (JRU Light Bombers)
- Most Improved Player: Chris Javier (San Beda Red Cubs)

== Broadcast notes ==
Studio 23 carried all games live. SkyCable Channel 166 (Balls HD) aired the finals series on high definition live, with Balls SD airing the replays. The Filipino Channel broadcast the games outside the Philippines.

Game	Play-by-play	Analyst	Courtside reporters
San Beda–Letran semifinal	Anton Roxas	Tonichi Yturri	Meg Punzalan and Ej Gamboa
San Sebastian–JRU semifinals game 1	Drei Felix	Butch Maniego	Triska Echiverri and Carla Rivera
San Sebastian–JRU semifinals game 2	Bill Velasco	Butch Maniego	Triska Echiverri and Ef Maronilla
Juniors' Finals game 1	Anton Roxas	Butch Maniego	Fairylene Sy and Rizza Diaz
Men's Finals game 1	Bill Velasco	Allan Gregorio	Chris Soler, Mike Abasolo, Triska Echiverri, Ej Gamboa
Juniors' Finals game 2	Toff Rada	Jude Roque	Fairylene Sy and Rizza Diaz
Men's Finals game 2	Drei Felix	Butch Maniego	Triska Echiverri and Ej Gamboa
Juniors' Finals game 3	Anton Roxas	Butch Maniego	Fairylene Sy and Rizza Diaz

== See also ==
- UAAP Season 72 basketball tournaments

Preceded by Season 84 (2008)	NCAA basketball seasons Season 85 (2009)	Succeeded by Season 86 (2010)
