= Garvo Lanete =

Filipino basketball player (born 1989)

Personal information
- Born: February 13, 1989 (age 37) Ormoc, Leyte, Philippines
- Listed height: 6 ft 2 in (1.88 m)
- Listed weight: 183 lb (83 kg)

Career information
- High school: San Beda (Manila)
- College: San Beda (2007–2011)
- PBA draft: 2015: 1st round, 6th overall pick
- Drafted by: NLEX Road Warriors
- Playing career: 2015–2021
- Position: Shooting guard
- Number: 13

Career history
- 2015–2017: NLEX Road Warriors
- 2017–2019: Meralco Bolts
- 2019–2021: NorthPort Batang Pier

Career highlights
- 4× NCAA Philippines champion (2007, 2008, 2010, 2011); 2× NCAA Philippines Mythical Five (2010, 2011)

Garvo A. Lanete (born February 13, 1989) is a Filipino former professional basketball player. He previously played in the Philippine Basketball Association (PBA) for three teams. He also won four championships in the NCAA, multiple PBA D-League titles, and played for the Philippines' men's national basketball team.

== College career ==
Lanete studied and played with San Beda Red Lions from 2007 to 2011. He came over from San Beda's junior team along with Anjo Caram, Alvin Padilla, and Dave Marcelo.

Lanete broke out in Season 85 as he put up double-digit scoring performances. He got his first Player of the Week award when he led San Beda to 2nd place early in the tournament standings. They went on to extend that record to 7–1 with a win over the AUF Great Danes in which he scored 20 points. In a win over the Arellano Chiefs, he scored 17 points and got San Beda into the Final Four. In the Final Four, they defeated the Letran Knights with him scoring 17 points and seven assists. However, they would lose in the Finals to the San Sebastian Stags.

In Season 86, San Beda started the season with four straight wins, including a win over the Knights in which Lanete had 22 points and made five rebounds, two assists and two steals. For that performance, he got his first Player of the Week award of the season. He then got his second Player of the Week award when he scored a season-high 30 points (with 13 scored in the fourth quarter) in a win over the Mapúa Cardinals. In a win over the Stags, he scored 23 points, and led San Beda to its first elimination round sweep in the program's history. For that accomplishment, he was given his third Player of the Week award for the season. The Red Lions went on to sweep its way through the playoffs and earn its 15th championship. For his performance that season, he was awarded the NCAA's Pivotal Player Award during the Collegiate Basketball Awards.

Lanete started Season 87 with two straight wins, including one over the Lyceum Pirates in which he had 19 points on four triples. In a win over the Benilde Blazers, he had only 12 points as he shot 5-of-21 from the field, but still contributed nine rebounds and four assists. He then got his career-high when he scored 32 points in a win over the EAC Generals, earning himself a Player of the Week award. He followed that up with 21 points and six rebounds in a win over Letran. In a rematch against EAC, he scored 23 points as they beat EAC by a 54-point margin. The Red Lions qualified for the Final Four once again with a win over the Cardinals in which he scored 23 points. He received another Player of the Week award when he scored 28 points in a win over Letran, but this time shared it with teammate Anthony Semerad. The Red Lions finished the elimination rounds as the top seed thanks to a win over the Stags in which he made the game-winning three pointer. He then led them to the Finals once again past the JRU Heavy Bombers. He played his last game with the Red Lions in their 57–55 Game 2 win over the Stags as they won the championship once again. He was awarded a spot on the NCAA's Mythical Team and also made the Mythical Team of the Collegiate Basketball Awards. In his five years at San Beda, the Red Lions won four out of five championships.

== Amateur career ==
Lanete played for the San Beda-Maynilad Water Dragons in the inaugural conference of the PBA D-League. When Maynilad was disbanded, he joined the NLEX Road Warriors and led the team to multiple titles until 2014. He also won the MVP with them during the 2013–14 Aspirants' Cup.

Lanete then played for the Hapee Fresh Fighters, joining them before the start of the 2014–15 Aspirants' Cup. They got to the Finals where in Game 2, he scored 22 points but went down with cramps in the fourth quarter. His teammates then stepped up in his absence and Hapee won its first D-League championship. However, he missed the succeeding conference due to a MCL injury. He ended his amateur career with six PBA D-League championships, and applied for the PBA draft.

== Professional career ==
Lanete was set to apply for the 2014 PBA draft. However, he decided to forgo the draft as he intended to train more and improve some of his weaknesses. After spending another year as a Gilas Cadet and with Hapee in the D-League, he applied for the PBA draft.

=== NLEX Road Warriors (2015–2017) ===
Lanete was drafted sixth overall by the NLEX Road Warriors in the 2015 PBA draft where he got to play under his former college coach in Boyet Fernandez. He signed a three-year maximum rookie contract with the team. In a 2016 Commissioner's Cup win over the Star Hotshots, he scored 21 points. He then scored 14 points in a win over the Meralco Bolts. In a loss to the TNT KaTropa, he scored 20 points. That conference, NLEX failed to qualify for the playoffs. He was then picked to participate in the Three-Point Shootout during the 2016 All-Star Weekend. In a 2016 Governors' Cup win over the Rain or Shine Elasto Painters, he scored 21 points on 6-of-9 shooting from downtown, together with eight rebounds, two assists, and two clutch triples. He then scored 25 points on five triples in 18 minutes off the bench in a win over the Globalport Batang Pier. He missed NLEX's last game of the elimination round due to fever and tonsilitis. In their playoff match against the San Miguel Beermen, he returned with 13 points off the bench, but San Miguel won over them.

In the offseason, Lanete gained a new head coach in Yeng Guiao. In a 2016–17 Philippine Cup loss to Meralco, he scored 14 points. In a Commissioner's Cup game against TNT, they led by as much as 29 points, but TNT came back and tied the game. He then committed a crucial turnover and TNT won the game.

=== Meralco Bolts (2017–2019) ===
On May 6, 2017, Lanete was traded from NLEX to the Meralco Bolts in a three-team trade. He didn't get to play right away as he had a strained calf. He made his debut as a starter in a Governors' Cup win over the Blackwater Elite, immediately making an impact with 15 points on 5-of-8 shooting from three, three rebounds, one assist, one block, and zero turnovers in nearly 24 minutes. In a matchup against his older brother Chico and the Phoenix Fuel Masters, he led Meralco to the win with a PBA career-high 27 points, four rebounds, two assists, and two steals. In the quarterfinals, he contributed 17 points to send Meralco to the semis. Meralco then got all the way to the Finals, where they went down 3–2 against Barangay Ginebra. He then started Game 6 and contributed 15 points to force a Game 7. Meralco however, lost in Game 7.

In a 2017–18 Philippine Cup win over Phoenix, Lanete led the team with 24 points on four three-pointers. He then scored 19 points, two rebounds and three steals in a win over Ginebra. For those performances, he was selected as the PBA's Player of the Week. In the Commissioner's Cup, he missed significant time due to spraining his shooting hand.

=== NorthPort Batang Pier (2019–2021) ===
On January 15, 2019, Lanete shipped him out to the NorthPort Batang Pier for a second-round pick. In a 2019 Commissioner's Cup win over San Miguel, he contributed 16 points. He scored 16 points again in a win over the Elasto Painters in which only seven Batang Pier played due to various injuries. In their playoff game against the Beermen, he led the team with 22 points and made five three-pointers, but the Beermen stopped them from reaching the semis. In a Governors' Cup loss to the Columbian Dyip, he contributed 19 points. They then lost again this time to TNT despite him leading with 23 points, going down 1–4. Despite their poor start, NorthPort rallied to get into the playoffs with the arrival of Christian Standhardinger via trade and a new import in Michael Qualls. As an 8th seed, they upset the 1st seed, which was NLEX, to get into the semis. In Game 1 of the semis against Ginebra, he led the team with 24 points on six-of-nine shooting from three. NorthPort would then go on to lose the series to Ginebra in four games.

In a 2020 Philippine Cup loss to Blackwater, Lanete contributed 14 points. They got their only win of the conference against the Dyip. In another loss to Ginebra, he scored 19 points.

In a 2021 Philippine Cup win over the Dyip, Lanete led the team with 18 points on four triples. He averaged just 4.9 points for that conference, before sitting out the Governors' Cup. On December 29, 2021, he retired from basketball to migrate to the United States with his family.

== PBA career statistics ==
Legend
GP	Games played	MPG	Minutes per game
FG%	Field-goal percentage	3P%	3-point field-goal percentage	FT%	Free-throw percentage
RPG	Rebounds per game	APG	Assists per game	SPG	Steals per game
BPG	Blocks per game	PPG	Points per game	**Bold**	Career high

=== Season-by-season averages ===
Year	Team	GP	MPG	FG%	3P%	FT%	RPG	APG	SPG	BPG	PPG
2015–16	NLEX	33	16.1	.391	.388	**.971**	1.4	.5	.4	.1	7.4
2016–17	NLEX	**40**	21.4	.330	.298	.881	1.9	**1.3**	.5	**.4**	6.6
2016–17	Meralco	**40**	21.4	.330	.298	.881	1.9	**1.3**	.5	**.4**	6.6
2017–18	Meralco	31	12.1	.396	.346	.833	1.1	.5	.2	.1	4.8
2019	NorthPort	**40**	17.1	.411	.389	.759	1.3	.6	.4	.2	7.2
2020	NorthPort	9	**25.7**	**.447**	**.444**	.810	**2.2**	1.2	**.6**	.1	**12.1**
2021	NorthPort	10	11.9	.375	.267	.917	1.1	.3	.1	.0	4.9
Career		163	17.4	.392	.356	.862	1.5	.7	.4	.2	7.2

== National team career ==
Lanete was first called up to the Philippines' men's national basketball team in 2011 for the SEA Games. In that tournament, he suffered a shoulder injury during the semifinals. Still, they won the gold medal over Thailand.

In 2012, Lanete was called up once again for the SEABA Cup. In wins over Indonesia and Malaysia, he contributed 14 points. Gilas then went on to beat Thailand once again and claim a spot in that year's FIBA Asia Cup. He was then included in the roster for that year's Jones Cup. In a win over Chinese Taipei's Team B, he led the team in scoring with 20 points. In that tournament, Gilas won the Jones Cup for the first time in 14 years by winning seven of their eight matches.

Lanete then participated in Gilas's campaigns in regional tournaments held in Dubai and Hong Kong. He was part of the 24-man pool for the 2013 FIBA Asia Championship. He was also called up to the Gilas roster for the 2013 SEA Games. In that tournament, Gilas swept its way to a gold medal.

In 2014, Lanete was called up for the 2014 FIBA Asia Cup. They won bronze in that tournament. In 2015, he was part of the 16-man pool for that year's SEA Games and SEABA Championship. He continued training with Gilas until he applied for the PBA Draft in 2015.

== Personal life ==
He has two brothers who are also basketball players, Von Harry (Bon Bon) and fellow former PBA player Chico. His father was also a former professional basketball player.

In June 2020, Lanete married Shelby Pearl, an American who did volunteer work in the Philippines. They live together in Atlanta, Georgia, where he coaches AAU basketball and is also the head varsity coach, assistant athletic director and weight trainer of Horizon Christian School.
