= NCAA Season 98 volleyball tournaments =

Volleyball tournament

NCAA Season 98
- Achieve greatness every day
- Host school: San Sebastian College–Recoletos
Men's Finals	G1	G2	G3	Wins
Perpetual Altas	3	2	3	2
San Beda Red Spikers	0	3	1	1
- Duration: April 11–16, 2023
- Arena(s): Filoil EcoOil Centre
- Finals MVP: Louie Ramirez
- Winning coach: Sammy Acaylar
- Semifinalists: Arellano Chiefs; EAC Generals
- TV network(s): GTV
Women's Finals	G1	G2	Wins
Benilde Lady Blazers	3	3	2
Lyceum Lady Pirates	0	0	0
- Duration: April 11–14, 2023
- Arena(s): Filoil EcoOil Centre
- Finals MVP: Jade Gentapa
- Winning coach: Jerry Yee
- Semifinalists: Perpetual Lady Altas; Mapúa Lady Cardinals
- TV network(s): GTV

The NCAA Season 98 volleyball tournaments are the volleyball tournaments of the National Collegiate Athletic Association (Philippines) for its 2022–23 season. Emilio Aguinaldo College is hosting the tournament for the first time.

The seniors' tournament began on February 18, 2023.

== Teams ==
All ten schools are participating.

Collegiate division
University	Men		Women	
University	Team	Coach	Team	Coach
Arellano University (AU)	Arellano Chiefs	Sherwin Meneses	Arellano Lady Chiefs	Roberto Javier
Colegio de San Juan de Letran (CSJL)	Letran Knights	Brian Esquibel	Letran Lady Knights	Michael Inoferio
De La Salle–College of Saint Benilde (CSB)	Benilde Blazers	Arnold Laniog	Benilde Lady Blazers	Jerry Yee
Emilio Aguinaldo College (EAC)	EAC Generals	Rodrigo Palmero	EAC Lady Generals	Rodrigo Palmero
José Rizal University (JRU)	JRU Heavy Bombers	Larry Sioco Jr.	JRU Lady Bombers	Mia Tioseco
Lyceum of the Philippines University (LPU)	Lyceum Pirates	Cromwel Garcia	Lyceum Lady Pirates	Cromwel Garcia
Mapúa University (MU)	Mapúa Cardinals	John Michael Millado	Mapúa Lady Cardinals	Clarence Esteban
San Beda University (SBU)	San Beda Red Spikers	Ariel Dela Cruz	San Beda Lady Red Spikers	Ariel Dela Cruz
San Sebastian College – Recoletos (SSC-R)	San Sebastian Stags	Clint Malazo	San Sebastian Lady Stags	Roger Gorayeb
University of Perpetual Help System DALTA (UPHSD)	Perpetual Altas	Sammy Acaylar	Perpetual Lady Altas	Sandy Rieta

== Men's tournament ==
=== Team line-up ===
Arellano Chiefs
No.	Name	Position
2	Arman Clarence Guinto	OH
4	Anfernee Curamen	MB
5	Carl Justin Berdal	OH
6	Adrian Villados	S
7	Demy Freedom Lapuz	OP
8	Jethro Jasper Cabilan	MB
10	James Paul Delos Santos	OP
11	Joshua Datu	L
13	Kim Vincent Tan	OH
14	Ralph Domingo	MB
15	Christian Dela Paz	OH
16	Exequel Orpilla	MB
17	Dan Mapy Aure	L
18	Melchor Bustillo	S
		HC

Letran Knights
No.	Name	Position
1		
2		
3		
4		
5		
6		
7		
8		
9		
10		
11		
12		
13		
14		
		HC

Benilde Blazers
No.	Name	Position
1		
2		
3		
4		
5		
6		
7		
8		
9		
10		
11		
12		
13		
14		
		HC

EAC Generals
No.	Name	Position
1		
2		
3		
4		
5		
6		
7		
8		
9		
10		
11		
12		
13		
14		
		HC

JRU Heavy Bombers
No.	Name	Position
1		
2		
3		
4		
5		
6		
7		
8		
9		
10		
11		
12		
13		
14		
		HC

Lyceum Pirates
No.	Name	Position
1		
2		
3		
4		
5		
6		
7		
8		
9		
10		
11		
12		
13		
14		
		HC

Mapúa Cardinals
No.	Name	Position
1		
2		
3		
4		
5		
6		
7		
8		
9		
10		
11		
12		
13		
14		
		HC

San Beda Red Spikers
No.	Name	Position
1		
2		
3		
4		
5		
6		
7		
8		
9		
10		
11		
12		
13		
14		
		HC

San Sebastian Stags
No.	Name	Position
1		
2		
3		
4		
5		
6		
7		
8		
9		
10		
11		
12		
13		
14		
		HC

Perpetual Altas
No.	Name	Position
1	MARAPOC, JED	
4	ZARENO, Joshua	OP
5	MEDALLA, Michael	
6	ANDRADE, Kc	
7	COLANGO, Emman	
8	BAGGAYAN, Jay Rick	
9	CODENIERA, Sean Archer Noel	
10	RAMIREZ, Leo	
13	GELOGO, Kylle Andre	
14	RAMIREZ, Louie	OH
15	SIMANGAN, Eddee Bryle	
16	ROSOS, Kirth Patrick	
18	PEPITO, John Phillip	
19	AUSTRIA, Hero	
	Sammy Acaylar	HC

=== Team standings ===
Pos	Team	Pld	W	L	Pts	SW	SL	SR	SPW	SPL	SPR	Qualification
1	Perpetual Altas	9	9	0	26	27	4	6.750	301	222	1.356	Advance to the Finals (Note: As Perpetual won all of their elimination round games, the stepladder format will be used instead of the regular Final Four format.)
2	Arellano Chiefs	9	8	1	22	24	11	2.182	447	417	1.072	Proceed to stepladder round 2
3	San Beda Red Spikers	9	6	3	20	23	12	1.917	407	394	1.033	Proceed to stepladder round 1
4	EAC Generals	9	6	3	18	22	14	1.571	420	414	1.014	Proceed to stepladder round 1
5	Mapúa Cardinals	9	5	4	15	21	16	1.313	369	324	1.139	
6	JRU Heavy Bombers	9	4	5	12	17	20	0.850	330	349	0.946	
7	Letran Knights	9	4	5	12	15	19	0.789	368	365	1.008	
8	Benilde Blazers	9	2	7	7	11	21	0.524	344	363	0.948	
9	San Sebastian Stags (H)	9	1	8	3	8	24	0.333	277	300	0.923	
10	Lyceum Pirates	9	0	9	0	0	27	0.000	371	375	0.989	

Rules for classification: 1) Number of wins; 2) match points; 3) sets ratio; 4) points ratio; 5) head-to-head record
(H) Host
Notes:

Point system:

3 points = win match in 3 or 4 sets
2 points = win match in 5 sets
1 point = lose match in 5 sets
0 point = lose match in 3 or 4 sets

==== Match-up results ====
Team ╲ Game	1	2	3	4	5	6	7	8	9
Arellano	JRU school colors	San Beda school colors	UPHD school colors	Lyceum school colors	Mapua school colors	SSC-R school colors	CSB school colors	Letran school colors	EAC school colors
Letran	San Beda school colors	Mapua school colors	EAC school colors	SSC-R school colors	JRU school colors	CSB school colors	UPHD school colors	Lyceum school colors	Arellano school colors
Benilde	SSC-R school colors	EAC school colors	San Beda school colors	UPHD school colors	Lyceum school colors	Mapua school colors	Letran school colors	Arellano school colors	JRU school colors
EAC	UPHD school colors	CSB school colors	Letran school colors	San Beda school colors	Lyceum school colors	Mapua school colors	SSC-R school colors	JRU school colors	Arellano school colors
JRU	Arellano school colors	UPHD school colors	Lyceum school colors	Mapua school colors	San Beda school colors	Letran school colors	SSC-R school colors	EAC school colors	CSB school colors
Lyceum	Mapua school colors	SSC-R school colors	JRU school colors	Arellano school colors	CSB school colors	EAC school colors	San Beda school colors	Letran school colors	UPHD school colors
Mapúa	Lyceum school colors	Letran school colors	SSC-R school colors	JRU school colors	Arellano school colors	CSB school colors	EAC school colors	San Beda school colors	UPHD school colors
San Beda	Letran school colors	Arellano school colors	CSB school colors	EAC school colors	JRU school colors	UPHD school colors	Lyceum school colors	Mapua school colors	SSC-R school colors
San Sebastian	CSB school colors	Lyceum school colors	Mapua school colors	Letran school colors	UPHD school colors	Arellano school colors	JRU school colors	EAC school colors	San Beda school colors
Perpetual	EAC school colors	JRU school colors	Arellano school colors	CSB school colors	SSC-R school colors	San Beda school colors	Letran school colors	Lyceum school colors	Mapua school colors

= Win; = Loss

==== Scores ====
Teams	AU	CSJL	CSB	EAC	JRU	LPU	MU	SBU	SSC-R	UPHSD
Arellano Chiefs		3–0	3–1	3–2	3–1	3–0	3–1	3–2	3–1	0–3
Letran Knights			3–1	0–3	2–3	3–0	3–2	1–3	3–1	0–3
Benilde Blazers				0–3	2–3	3–0	0–3	1–3	3–0	0–3
EAC Generals					3–2	3–0	2–3	3–2	3–1	0–3
JRU Heavy Bombers						3–0	2–3	0–3	3–1	0–3
Lyceum Pirates							0–3	0–3	0–3	0–3
Mapúa Cardinals								1–3	3–0	2–3
San Beda Red Spikers									3–0	1–3
San Sebastian Stags										1–3
Perpetual Altas										

Legend: Blue = left column team win; Red = top row team win.

=== Bracket ===
First round (Single elimination)
3	San Beda	3
4	EAC	1

Second round (Single elimination)
2	Arellano	1
3	San Beda	3

Finals (Best-of-three playoff)
1	Perpetual	3	2	3
3	San Beda	0	3	1

=== Stepladder semifinals ===
As Perpetual won all elimination round games, the stepladder format shall be used. The first two rounds are straight knockout games.

==== First round ====
March 26, 2023; 12:00 p.m.	San Beda Red Spikers	3–1	EAC Generals	Filoil EcoOil Centre, San Juan; Attendance: 650; Referees: Ronaldo Lumagbas (NR) and Spinks Cabusa (NR)
March 26, 2023; 12:00 p.m.	(25–22, 25–27, 25–16, 26–24)			Filoil EcoOil Centre, San Juan; Attendance: 650; Referees: Ronaldo Lumagbas (NR) and Spinks Cabusa (NR)

==== Second round ====
March 29, 2023; 12:00 p.m.	Arellano Chiefs	1–3	San Beda Red Spikers	Filoil EcoOil Centre, San Juan; Attendance: 600; Referees: Rene Gonzales (NR) and Spinks Cabusa (NR)
March 29, 2023; 12:00 p.m.	(25–27, 25–12, 17–25, 18–25)			Filoil EcoOil Centre, San Juan; Attendance: 600; Referees: Rene Gonzales (NR) and Spinks Cabusa (NR)

=== Finals ===
The finals is a best-of-three playoff.

Defending champions (from 2018) Perpetual qualified to the Finals by winning all of its elimination round games.

April 11, 2023; 12:00 p.m.	Perpetual Altas	3–0	San Beda Red Spikers	Filoil EcoOil Centre, San Juan; Attendance: 1,500; Referees: Antonio Espartero (NR) and Erwin Lou Cordero (NR)
April 11, 2023; 12:00 p.m.	(25–20, 25–16, 25–22)			Filoil EcoOil Centre, San Juan; Attendance: 1,500; Referees: Antonio Espartero (NR) and Erwin Lou Cordero (NR)

April 14, 2023; 12:00 p.m.	Perpetual Altas	2–3	San Beda Red Spikers	Filoil EcoOil Centre, San Juan; Attendance: 1,500; Referees: Antonio Espartero (NR) and Erwin Lou Cordero (NR)
April 14, 2023; 12:00 p.m.	(25–17, 27–25, 22–25, 23–25, 11–15)			Filoil EcoOil Centre, San Juan; Attendance: 1,500; Referees: Antonio Espartero (NR) and Erwin Lou Cordero (NR)

April 16, 2023; 2:00 p.m.	Perpetual Altas	3–1	San Beda Red Spikers	Filoil EcoOil Centre, San Juan; Attendance: 431; Referees: Antonio Espartero (NR) and Emmanuel Yadao (NR)
April 16, 2023; 2:00 p.m.	(25–21, 25–20, 20–25, 25–22)			Filoil EcoOil Centre, San Juan; Attendance: 431; Referees: Antonio Espartero (NR) and Emmanuel Yadao (NR)

- Most Valuable Player: Louie Ramirez (Perpetual Altas)
- Coach of the Year: Sammy Acaylar (Perpetual Altas)

=== Awards ===
NCAA Season 98 men's volleyball champions

- Most Valuable Player: Louie Ramirez (Perpetual Altas)
- Rookie of the Year: Vince Himzon (Letran Knights)
- Best outside spiker: Barbie San Andres (Mapúa Cardinals)
  - 2nd best outside spiker: Joshua Ramilo (EAC Generals)
- Best middle blocker: Vince Himzon (Letran Knights)
  - 2nd best middle blocker: Jethro Cabillan (Arellano Chiefs)
- Best opposite spiker: Joshua Zareno (Perpetual Altas)
- Best setter: Adrian Villados (Arellano Chiefs)
- Best libero: Bhim Diones (EAC Generals)

== Women's tournament ==
=== Teams line-up ===
Arellano Lady Chiefs
No.	Name	Position
1	ADANTE, Kristine Claire	S
2	DIÑO, Charmina	OH
4	MANUNTAG, Janice	OH
5	CUENCA, Cherry Mae	L
6	PADILLON, MarianneLei Angelique	OH
7	TUDLASAN, Laika	OH
9	Sasuman, Nicole Victoria	OP
10	PARALEJAS, Donnalyn Mae	S
11	BATINDAAN, Dodee Risa Joy	MB
13	ABAY, Trina Marice (c)	MB
14	DE GUZMAN, Pauline	OP
15	QUITALEG, Ma. Sophia	L
17	PECAÑA, Lorraine	MB
19	MATAWARAN, Robbie Mae	MB
	CEBALLOS, Harem (r)	
	ALBINO, Mhegan (r)	
	Roberto Javier	HC

Letran Lady Knights
No.	Name	Position
1	NITURA, Judiel	
2	CASTRO, Julienne	OH
	DELA CRUZ, Kathleen	
6	LEDESMA, Angelique	
7	CUNADA, Chamberlaine	
8	MUSNGI, Edma Anne	S
9	URMENETA, Shereena (c)	OP
10	ESTRELLER, Natalie	S
	SANTOS, Alyssa Jeremay	
	RELUCIO, Andre	
16	ISAR, Lastlie Jade	MB
17	TAPANG, Lea Rizel	OH
18	MELENDRES, Daisy	MB
19	SILVA, Lara Mae	L
	ALMIRANTE, Keira r	
	DEQUILLA, Trisha (r)	
	Michael Inoferio	HC

Benilde Lady Blazers
No.	Name	Position
1	BASARTE, Chenae	S
3	GAMIT, Michelle	MB
4	ESTENZO, Kim Alison	L
5	GETIGAN, Fiona Naomi	L
6	MONDEJAR, Angelika	
7	GENTAPA, Jade	OH
8	MONDOÑEDO, Cloanne Sophia (c)	S
9	PASCUAL, Jhasmin Gayle	OP
11	AVILA, Ma. Camill	MB
12	APOSTOL, Corrine Alysson	OH
14	ESTOQUE, Wielyn	OH
17	DOROG, Jessa	OH
18	ONDANGAN, Cristy	MB
21	NOLASCO, Zamantha	MB
	Jerry Yee	HC

EAC Lady Generals
No.	Name	Position
1	MANLAPAZ, Ma. Kristina Ro-Ann	OP
2	OMAPAS, Jennifer	OH
3	MAGALONA, Rhea	
4	BAÑARES, Monna Sherina	L
5	VILLENA, Jamaica	MB
6	NAPAL, Marjorie	
7	REYES, Krizzia	
	SALVALOZA, Alex Cyra	L
10	PORTO, Jeanne Kirstine	MB\
12	FORMENTO, Anne Jelyn	S
13	ALMAZAN, Cathrine (c)	OH
16	LUT, Georgeena	
17	QUIJANO, Alyanna Bea Marie	MB
	RAZONABLE, Alessandra Julienne	
	GAMBOA, Maria Philomena (r)	
	GALLARDEZ, Dhariane Andreane (r)	
	Rodrigo Palmero	HC

JRU Lady Bombers
No.	Name	Position
7	NIEGOS, Sydney Mae (c)	MB
5	ALONA, Marianne	L
	AMANTE, Mailey	
16	BATARA, Khreiszantha Gayle	MB
	DELA CUESTA, Ericka Mhey	
4	EGERA, Jonazel Lyka	OH
3	JAZARENO, Karyla Rafaela	OH
10	LAURENTE, Jerry Lyn	S
	ORTIZ, Reizabelle	
	ROSARIO, Syzelle Luoise	
8	ROSE, Riza	OP
9	RUIZ, Mary May	OH
1	SILVERIO, Genelyn	MB
	VILLANUEVA, Danica	
	MARANAN, Carmela Daphne (r)	
	Mia Tioseco	HC

Lyceum Lady Pirates
No.	Name	Position
3	TULANG, Janeth	MB
4	STA. MARIA, Lois	
5	LOPEZ, Ma. Light Jericha	L
6	MALIGMAT, MM Jewel Therese	OP
7	RIVAS, Marcela Angela	
	TOCA, Francheska Veron	
	TOPACIO, Lean Isabelle	
10	PUZON, Venice (c)	S
	GALEDO, Katrina Paula	
12	DOGUNA, Joan	OH
13	PEREZ, Ritanhelle	
	DAYA, Micah Niña	
	ZACARLAS, Shereen Atasha	
16	DAHAB, Zonxie	MB
15	DOLORITO, Johna Denise	OH
	MACANAP, Maricar (r)	
	Cromwel Garcia	HC

Mapúa Lady Cardinals
No.	Name	Position
7	BARBIERA, Princess Jolina	MB
20	BASBAS, Vanessa	L
4	BATAC, Chenie	OH
1	CABADIN, Gregchelle Grace	
	DALIDA, Sunshine	
18	DE GUZMAN, Hannah	18
9	DELA CRUZ, Roxie	OH
10	ESPIRITU, Ayena Gwen (c)	S
8	GOJOL, Trixie Mae	S
	MACATANGAY, Frances Isabel	
3	MANALO, Therese Angeli	OH
11	ONG, Alyanna Nicole	MB
5	SY, Janina Dimples	L
	VERGINO, Raina Airyl	
	ESTEBAN, Francheska Clarisse (r)	
	Clarence Esteban	HC

San Beda Lady Red Spikers
No.	Name	Position
1	GREGORIO, Jan Miles	L
2	ABRAHAM, Kleiner Ross	OP
	ANI, Hermione Mikaela	
	VIRAY, Maria Isabella	
5	CASTILLO, Chinna Alyson	OH
	HADLOCON, Rea Mae	
	SALANGSANG, Francesca Louise	
8	CENZON, Patricia Ysabel	S
	CASUGOD, Jaschryl	
13	PARAS, Trisha Mae (c)	MB
	TAYAG, Maxinne Joyce	
15	TAYAG, Marianne Louise	MB
17	MOLINA, Katleya Jewel	OH
18	BINONDO, Aryanna	
	GEMINEZ, Denise Jel (r)	
	GALBADORES, Kouline (r)	
	Ariel Dela Cruz	HC

San Sebastian Lady Stags
No.	Name	Position
3	BERMILLO, Jewelle	L
	BORJA, Clarence Claire	
	CARREON, Jamille Veronica	
2	DIONISIO, Kristine Joy	OH
12	LUMIBAO, Jassy Lei	MB
4	MARASIGAN, Christina	OP
	REQUIERME, Shane	
1	SANTOS, Katherine	OH
9	SISON, Alexia Vea (c)	S
	STA. MARIA, Hayvenae	
10	TAN, Kamille Josephine Amaka	MB
	Roger Gorayeb	HC

Perpetual Lady Altas
No.	Name	Position
1	DAPOL, Mary Rhose	OH
2	BONOL, Kristine Claire	
3	BEDAÑA, Winnie	MB
4	OMIPON, Shaila Allaine	OH
6	PADUA, Janine	OP
	REYES, Kaila Edilsam	
	OCADO, Charmaine Mae	
	CORDERO, Krisha	
	ARCELLANA, Kathrina	
12	ANDAL, Marian Tracy	L
	ENRICO, Charisse Mae	
15	ALDEA, Razel Paula	MB
16	SAPIN, Jhasmine	S
	LOZANO, Denise Joanna	
	SANTIAGO, Karla Jane (r)	
	REYES, Pauline Mae (r)	
	Sandy Rieta	HC

=== Elimination round ===
==== Team standings ====
Pos	Team	Pld	W	L	Pts	SW	SL	SR	SPW	SPL	SPR	Qualification
1	Benilde Lady Blazers	9	9	0	25	27	5	5.400	609	474	1.285	Advance to the Finals (Note: As Benilde won all of their elimination round games, the stepladder format will be used instead of the regular Final Four format.)
2	Perpetual Lady Altas	9	8	1	24	24	9	2.667	330	300	1.100	Proceed to stepladder round 2
3	Lyceum Lady Pirates	9	6	3	19	22	11	2.000	418	413	1.012	Proceed to stepladder round 1
4	Mapúa Lady Cardinals	9	6	3	19	24	17	1.412	411	407	1.010	Proceed to stepladder round 1
5	Letran Lady Knights	9	5	4	17	21	18	1.167	527	517	1.019	
6	Arellano Lady Chiefs	9	5	4	16	20	14	1.429	606	525	1.154	
7	San Sebastian Lady Stags	9	3	6	10	15	18	0.833	231	282	0.819	
8	JRU Lady Bombers	9	1	8	5	11	24	0.458	584	632	0.924	
9	San Beda Lady Red Spikers	9	1	8	4	11	24	0.458	274	360	0.761	
10	EAC Lady Generals (H)	9	1	8	2	8	26	0.308	438	523	0.837	

Rules for classification: 1) Number of wins; 2) match points; 3) sets ratio; 4) points ratio; 5) head-to-head record
(H) Host
Notes:

Point system:

3 points = win match in 3 or 4 sets
2 points = win match in 5 sets
1 point = lose match in 5 sets
0 point = lose match in 3 or 4 sets

==== Match-up results ====
Team ╲ Game	1	2	3	4	5	6	7	8	9
Arellano	JRU school colors	San Beda school colors	UPHD school colors	Lyceum school colors	Mapua school colors	SSC-R school colors	CSB school colors	Letran school colors	EAC school colors
Letran	San Beda school colors	Mapua school colors	EAC school colors	SSC-R school colors	JRU school colors	CSB school colors	UPHD school colors	Lyceum school colors	Arellano school colors
Benilde	SSC-R school colors	EAC school colors	San Beda school colors	UPHD school colors	Lyceum school colors	Mapua school colors	Letran school colors	Arellano school colors	JRU school colors
EAC	UPHD school colors	CSB school colors	Letran school colors	San Beda school colors	Lyceum school colors	Mapua school colors	SSC-R school colors	JRU school colors	Arellano school colors
JRU	Arellano school colors	UPHD school colors	Lyceum school colors	Mapua school colors	San Beda school colors	Letran school colors	SSC-R school colors	EAC school colors	CSB school colors
Lyceum	Mapua school colors	SSC-R school colors	JRU school colors	Arellano school colors	CSB school colors	EAC school colors	San Beda school colors	Letran school colors	UPHD school colors
Mapúa	Lyceum school colors	Letran school colors	SSC-R school colors	JRU school colors	Arellano school colors	CSB school colors	EAC school colors	San Beda school colors	UPHD school colors
San Beda	Letran school colors	Arellano school colors	CSB school colors	EAC school colors	JRU school colors	UPHD school colors	Lyceum school colors	Mapua school colors	SSC-R school colors
San Sebastian	CSB school colors	Lyceum school colors	Mapua school colors	Letran school colors	UPHD school colors	Arellano school colors	JRU school colors	EAC school colors	San Beda school colors
Perpetual	EAC school colors	JRU school colors	Arellano school colors	CSB school colors	SSC-R school colors	San Beda school colors	Letran school colors	Lyceum school colors	Mapua school colors

= Win; = Loss; = Match cancelled

==== Scores ====
Teams	AU	CSJL	CSB	EAC	JRU	LPU	MU	SBU	SSC-R	UPHSD
Arellano Lady Chiefs		2–3	0–3	3–0	3–0	3–0	2–3	3–1	3–1	1–3
Letran Lady Knights			0–3	3–1	3–2	0–3	2–3	3–0	3–1	1–3
Benilde Lady Blazers				3–0	3–0	3–2	3–2	3–0	3–1	3–0
EAC Lady Generals					2–3	1–3	1–3	3–2	0–3	0–3
JRU Lady Bombers						1–3	1–3	0–3	2–3	1–3
Lyceum Lady Pirates							2–3	3–0	3–0	0–3
Mapúa Lady Cardinals								3–0	3–2	0–3
San Beda Lady Red Spikers									0–3	0–3
San Sebastian Lady Stags										0–3
Perpetual Lady Altas										

Legend: Blue = left column team win; Red = top row team win.

=== Bracket ===
First round (Single elimination)
3	Lyceum	3
4	Mapúa	1

Second round (Single elimination)
2	Perpetual	1
3	Lyceum	3

Finals (Best-of-three playoff)
1	Benilde	3	3
3	Lyceum	0	0

=== Stepladder semifinals ===
As Benilde won all elimination round games, the stepladder format shall be used. The first two rounds are straight knockout games.

==== First round ====
March 26, 2023; 2:00 p.m.	Lyceum Lady Pirates	3–1	Mapúa Lady Cardinals	Filoil EcoOil Centre, San Juan; Attendance: 650; Referees: Melandro Castro (NR) and Jayson Magat (NR)
March 26, 2023; 2:00 p.m.	(25–18, 25–23, 29–31, 27–25)			Filoil EcoOil Centre, San Juan; Attendance: 650; Referees: Melandro Castro (NR) and Jayson Magat (NR)

==== Second round ====
March 29, 2023; 2:00 p.m.	Perpetual Lady Altas	1–3	Lyceum Lady Pirates	Filoil EcoOil Centre, San Juan; Attendance: 1,503; Referees: Glenn Flores (NR) and Melandro Castro (NR)
March 29, 2023; 2:00 p.m.	(25–18, 20–25, 25–17, 26–24)			Filoil EcoOil Centre, San Juan; Attendance: 1,503; Referees: Glenn Flores (NR) and Melandro Castro (NR)

=== Finals ===
The finals is a best-of-three playoff.

Benilde qualified to its second consecutive Finals by winning all of its elimination round games.

April 11, 2023; 2:00 p.m.	Benilde Lady Blazers	3–0	Lyceum Lady Pirates	Filoil EcoOil Centre, San Juan; Attendance: 1,000; Referees: Melandro Castro (NR) and Jayson Magat (NR) ,
April 11, 2023; 2:00 p.m.	(25–17, 25–19, 25–19)			Filoil EcoOil Centre, San Juan; Attendance: 1,000; Referees: Melandro Castro (NR) and Jayson Magat (NR) ,

April 14, 2023; 2:00 p.m.	Benilde Lady Blazers	3–0	Lyceum Lady Pirates	Filoil EcoOil Centre, San Juan; Attendance: 1,050; Referees: Spinks Cabusa (NR) and Melandro Castro (NR)
April 14, 2023; 2:00 p.m.	(25–19, 25–11, 25–20)			Filoil EcoOil Centre, San Juan; Attendance: 1,050; Referees: Spinks Cabusa (NR) and Melandro Castro (NR)

- Finals MVP : Jade Gentapa (Benilde Lady Blazers)
- Coach of the Year : Jerry Yee (Benilde Lady Blazers)

=== Awards ===
NCAA Season 98 women's volleyball champions

- Most valuable player: Mary Rhose Dapol (Perpetual Lady Altas)
- Rookie of the Year: Shaila Allaine Omipon (Perpetual Lady Altas)
- 1st best outside spiker: Mary Rhose Dapol (Perpetual Lady Altas)
  - 2nd best outside spiker: Jade Gentapa (Benilde Lady Blazers)
- 1st best middle blocker: Trina Marice Abay (Arellano Lady Chiefs)
  - 2nd best middle blocker: Janeth Tulang (Lyceum Lady Pirates)
- Best opposite spiker: Jhasmine Gayle Pascual (Benilde Lady Blazers)
- Best setter: Venice Puzon (Lyceum Lady Pirates)
- Best libero: Marian Tracy Andal (Perpetual Lady Altas)

==== Players of the Week ====
The Collegiate Press Corps awards a "player of the week" on Mondays for performances on the preceding week.

Week	Player	Team
Week 1	Mary Rhose Dapol	Perpetual Lady Altas
Week 2	Gayle Pascual	Benilde Lady Blazers
Week 3	Joan Doguna	Lyceum Lady Pirates
Week 4	Shaila Omipon	Perpetual Lady Altas

== See also ==
- UAAP Season 85 volleyball tournaments

Preceded by Season 97 (2022)	NCAA volleyball tournaments Season 98 (2023)	Succeeded by Season 99 (2024)
