= NCAA Season 86 =

- Host school: San Sebastian College–Recoletos
- Tagline: "Youth Speaks @ 86!"

General
- Seniors: San Beda Red Lions
- Juniors: San Sebastian Staglets

Seniors' champions
Sport		Men	Women
Basketball		San Beda	N/A
Volleyball		Perpetual	San Sebastian
Chess		Benilde	
Taekwondo		San Beda	San Beda
Table Tennis		San Beda	Benilde
Lawn Tennis		Letran	
Swimming		San Beda	Benilde (DS)
Beach Volleyball		Arellano	Perpetual
Track and field		JRU	N/A
Football		San Beda	N/A
Badminton		Benilde (DS)	Benilde (DS)
Soft Tennis		N/A	Perpetual (DS)
- Cheerdance: Perpetual (EX) (Ex - Coed)

Juniors' champions
Sport		Boys	Girls
Basketball		San Beda	N/A
Volleyball		Perpetual	
Chess		LSGH	
Taekwondo		LSGH	
Table Tennis		San Beda	
Lawn Tennis		San Beda	
Swimming		LSGH	
Beach Volleyball		Perpetual	
Track and field		San Sebastian	
Football		LSGH	
Badminton		LSGH (DS)	
- (NT) = No tournament; (DS) = Demonstration Sport; (Ex) = Exhibition;

NCAA Season 86 was the 2010–11 season of the National Collegiate Athletic Association (NCAA) of the Philippines. The host for this year was San Sebastian College–Recoletos (SSC–R).

The official theme and slogan of the season was Youth Speaks @ 86!

== Probationary member schools ==
After being guest schools in the 2009-10 season, Arellano University and Emilio Aguinaldo College were accepted as probationary members for this season. Angeles University Foundation backed out on being a probationary member.

== Basketball ==
The centerpiece event, the seniors' basketball tournament will begin on June 26 at the Araneta Coliseum in Quezon City. Instead of the traditional opening day where all teams will play, only four teams will do, although the tradition of the champion team playing the host school in the second game will still be done, with host school and defending champions San Sebastian Stags going up against last season's hosts and dethroned champions San Beda Red Lions. The first Sunday games in league history were played the next day at the Filoil Flying V Arena in San Juan. This was made in deference to June 30, the day of the inauguration of President Benigno Aquino III. After that, games will be played on Monday, Wednesday and Friday, with the juniors games tipping off at 10:00 a.m. and the seniors at 2:00 p.m.

=== Seniors' tournament ===
==== Elimination round ====
Pos	Team	W	L	PCT	GB	Qualification
1	San Beda Red Lions	16	0	1.000	—	Thrice-to-beat in the Finals (Note: As San Beda won all of their elimination round games, the stepladder format will be used instead of the regular Final Four format.)
2	San Sebastian Stags (H)	13	3	.813	3	Proceed to stepladder round 2
3	JRU Heavy Bombers	12	4	.750	4	Proceed to stepladder round 1
4	Mapúa Cardinals	9	7	.563	7	Proceed to stepladder round 1
5	Letran Knights	7	9	.438	9	
6	Arellano Chiefs (X)	6	10	.375	10	
7	Benilde Blazers	5	11	.313	11	
8	Perpetual Altas	2	14	.125 (Note: Head-to-head record: Perpetual 1–1 EAC (Perpetual +5))	14	
9	EAC Generals (X)	2	14	.125	14	

Source: ABS-CBN Sports
Rules for classification: 1) winning percentage; 2) if tied for top 4, one-game playoff; 3) head-to-head record; 4) overall point differential
(H) Hosts; (X) Under probation

=== Bracket ===
Stepladder round 1 (Single-elimination)
3	JRU	60
4	Mapúa	54

Stepladder round 2 (Single-elimination)
2	San Sebastian	61
3	JRU	52

Finals (#1 has thrice-to-beat advantage)
1	San Beda	93	85
2	San Sebastian	73	70

=== Juniors' tournament ===
==== Elimination round ====
Pos	Team	W	L	PCT	GB	Qualification
1	San Beda Red Cubs (Note: San Beda forfeited their win against Letran when one of their players wore the wrong uniform.)	14	2	.875	—	Twice-to-beat in the semifinals
2	San Sebastian Staglets (H)	12	4	.750	2	Twice-to-beat in the semifinals
3	Perpetual Junior Altas	10	6	.625	4	Twice-to-win in the semifinals
4	Letran Squires	9	7	.563 (Note: Head-to-head record: LSGH 2–2, Letran 2–2, JRU 2–2 (LSGH +8, Letran +7, JRU −15); fourth-seed playoffs: Letran 87–73 JRU, Letran 91–85 LSGH)	5	Twice-to-win in the semifinals
5	La Salle Green Hills Greenies	9	7	.563	5	
6	JRU Light Bombers	9	7	.563	5	
7	Mapúa Red Robins	6	10	.375	8	
8	EAC–ICA Brigadiers (X)	3	13	.188	11	
9	Arellano Braves (X)	0	16	.000	14	

Source: ABS-CBN Sports
Rules for classification: 1) winning percentage; 2) if tied for top 4, one-game playoff; 3) head-to-head record; 4) head-to-head point differential; 5) overall point differential
(H) Hosts; (X) Under probation

==== Bracket ====
Semifinals (Nos. 1 & 2 have twice-to-beat advantage)
1	San Beda	92
4	Letran	80
2	San Sebastian	87
3	Perpetual	76

Finals (Best-of-three series)
1	San Beda	89	95
2	San Sebastian	64	84

== Volleyball ==
=== Women's tournament ===
The semifinals in the women's division was restarted after the league forfeited all the games that April Ann Sartin and Ronnery dela Cruz of Perpetual Help and Arianne Yap and Janel Lim of St. Benilde played for eligibility violations. CSB's and Perpetual's games during the elimination round were also forfeited.

==== Elimination round ====
Team	W	L	PCT	Tie*
San Sebastian Lady Stags	8	0	1.000	
**Letran Lady Knights**	7	1	.875	
EAC Lady Generals	6	2	.750	
San Beda Red Lionesses	4	4	.500	1.39
JRU Lady Bombers	4	4	.500	1.25
Arellano Lady Chiefs	4	4	.500	1.19
Mapúa Lady Cardinals	2	6	.250	
Perpetual Lady Altas	0	8	DQ	
Benilde Lady Blazers	0	8	DQ	

Season host is boldfaced
- Sets won ratio

Qualified to the semifinals
Qualification loss through forfeiture

Teams
Teams	1	2	3	4	5	6	7	8
AU	EAC school colors	SSC-R school colors	Letran school colors	JRU school colors	San Beda school colors	CSB school colors	Mapua school colors	UPHD school colors
CSJL	JRU school colors	Mapua school colors	UPHD school colors	CSB school colors	Arellano school colors	SSC-R school colors	EAC school colors	San Beda school colors
Benilde	EAC school colors	JRU school colors	UPHD school colors	Letran school colors	SSC-R school colors	Arellano school colors	San Beda school colors	Mapua school colors
EAC	CSB school colors	Arellano school colors	San Beda school colors	Mapua school colors	Letran school colors	UPHD school colors	SSC-R school colors	JRU school colors
JRU	Letran school colors	CSB school colors	San Beda school colors	SSC-R school colors	Mapua school colors	Arellano school colors	UPHD school colors	EAC school colors
Mapúa	San Beda school colors	Letran school colors	EAC school colors	JRU school colors	UPHD school colors	SSC-R school colors	Arellano school colors	CSB school colors
San Beda	Mapua school colors	EAC school colors	JRU school colors	UPHD school colors	SSC-R school colors	Arellano school colors	Letran school colors	CSB school colors
San Sebastian	UPHD school colors	Arellano school colors	JRU school colors	San Beda school colors	CSB school colors	Letran school colors	Mapua school colors	EAC school colors
Perpetual	SSC-R school colors	Letran school colors	CSB school colors	San Beda school colors	Mapua school colors	JRU school colors	EAC school colors	Arellano school colors

Win
Win via forfeit
Loss
Loss via forfeit

==== Semifinals ====
Team	Forfeited			Restart		
Team	W	L	PCT	W	L	PCT
Benilde Lady Blazers	~~1~~	~~0~~	~~1.000~~	N/A		
Perpetual Lady Altas	~~1~~	~~0~~	~~1.000~~	N/A		
Letran Lady Knights	~~0~~	~~1~~	~~.000~~	3	0	1.000
San Sebastian Lady Stags	~~0~~	~~1~~	~~.000~~	2	1	0.500
EAC Lady Generals	N/A			1	2	0.000
San Beda Red Lionesses	N/A			0	3	0.000

Qualified to the finals
Qualification loss through forfeiture

Teams
Teams	1	2	3
Letran	EAC school colors	San Beda school colors	SSC-R school colors
EAC	Letran school colors	SSC-R school colors	San Beda school colors
San Beda	SSC-R school colors	Letran school colors	EAC school colors
San Sebastian	San Beda school colors	EAC school colors	Letran school colors

==== Finals ====
Date		Score		Set 1	Set 2	Set 3	Set 4	Set 5	Total
Jan 20	**San Sebastian Lady Stags**	**3–1**	Letran Lady Knights	25 –14	21 –25	25 –21	25 –18	–	**96–78**
Jan 26	**San Sebastian Lady Stags**	**3–2**	Letran Lady Knights	22–25	22–25	25–12	25–15	15–11	**107–88**
**San Sebastian wins series 2–0**

=== Men's tournament ===
==== Elimination round ====
Team	W	L	PCT
Arellano Chiefs	8	0	1.000
Perpetual Altas	7	1	.875
**Letran Knights**	6	2	.750
San Beda Red Lions	5	3	.625
Benilde Blazers	3	4	.428
EAC Generals	3	5	.375
JRU Heavy Bombers	2	6	.250
San Sebastian Stags	1	7	.125
Mapúa Cardinals	0	7	.000

Season host is boldfaced.

Qualified to the semifinals

Teams
Teams	1	2	3	4	5	6	7	8
AU	EAC school colors	SSC-R school colors	Letran school colors	JRU school colors	San Beda school colors	CSB school colors	Mapua school colors	UPHD school colors
CSJL	JRU school colors	Mapua school colors	UPHD school colors	CSB school colors	Arellano school colors	SSC-R school colors	EAC school colors	San Beda school colors
Benilde	EAC school colors	JRU school colors	UPHD school colors	Letran school colors	SSC-R school colors	Arellano school colors	San Beda school colors	Mapua school colors
EAC	CSB school colors	Arellano school colors	San Beda school colors	Mapua school colors	Letran school colors	UPHD school colors	SSC-R school colors	JRU school colors
JRU	Letran school colors	CSB school colors	San Beda school colors	SSC-R school colors	Mapua school colors	Arellano school colors	UPHD school colors	EAC school colors
Mapúa	San Beda school colors	Letran school colors	EAC school colors	JRU school colors	UPHD school colors	SSC-R school colors	Arellano school colors	CSB school colors
San Beda	Mapua school colors	EAC school colors	JRU school colors	UPHD school colors	SSC-R school colors	Arellano school colors	Letran school colors	CSB school colors
San Sebastian	UPHD school colors	Arellano school colors	JRU school colors	San Beda school colors	CSB school colors	Letran school colors	Mapua school colors	EAC school colors
Perpetual	SSC-R school colors	Letran school colors	CSB school colors	San Beda school colors	Mapua school colors	JRU school colors	EAC school colors	Arellano school colors

Win
Loss

==== Semifinals ====
Team	W	L	PCT
Perpetual Altas	3	0	1.000
Arellano Chiefs	2	1	0.667
San Beda Red Lions	1	2	.333
Letran Knights	0	3	.000

Qualified for the finals

Teams
Teams	1	2	3
Arellano	San Beda school colors	Letran school colors	UPHD school colors
Letran	UPHD school colors	Arellano school colors	San Beda school colors
San Beda	Arellano school colors	UPHD school colors	Letran school colors
Perpetual	Letran school colors	San Beda school colors	Arellano school colors

==== Finals ====
Date		Score		Set 1	Set 2	Set 3	Set 4	Set 5	Total
Jan 20	**Perpetual Altas**	**3–1**	Arellano Chiefs	25–15	25–21	20–25	25–17	–	**95–78**
Jan 24	**Perpetual Altas**	**3–1**	Arellano Chiefs	22–25	25–10	25–17	25–18	–	**97–70**
**UPHSD wins series 2–0**

=== Juniors' tournament ===
==== Elimination round ====
Team	W	L	PCT
Perpetual Junior Altas	7	0	1.000
San Sebastian Staglets	6	1	.857
EAC–ICA Brigadiers	5	2	.714
Arellano Braves	4	3	.571
**Letran Squires**	3	4	.429
San Beda Red Cubs	2	5	.286
La Salle Green Hills Greenies	1	6	.143
Mapúa Red Robins	0	7	.000

Season host is boldfaced.

Qualified to the semifinals

Teams
Teams	1	2	3	4	5	6	7
AU	EAC school colors	SSC-R school colors	Letran school colors	San Beda school colors	CSB school colors	Mapua school colors	UPHD school colors
CSJL	Mapua school colors	UPHD school colors	CSB school colors	Arellano school colors	SSC-R school colors	EAC school colors	San Beda school colors
EAC	CSB school colors	Arellano school colors	San Beda school colors	Mapua school colors	Letran school colors	UPHD school colors	SSC-R school colors
LSGH	EAC school colors	UPHD school colors	Letran school colors	SSC-R school colors	Arellano school colors	San Beda school colors	Mapua school colors
MHSS	San Beda school colors	Letran school colors	EAC school colors	UPHD school colors	SSC-R school colors	Arellano school colors	CSB school colors
San Beda	Mapua school colors	EAC school colors	UPHD school colors	SSC-R school colors	Arellano school colors	Letran school colors	CSB school colors
San Sebastian	UPHD school colors	Arellano school colors	San Beda school colors	CSB school colors	Letran school colors	Mapua school colors	EAC school colors
Perpetual	SSC-R school colors	Letran school colors	CSB school colors	San Beda school colors	Mapua school colors	EAC school colors	Arellano school colors

Win
Loss

==== Semifinals ====
Team	W	L	PCT
Perpetual Junior Altas	3	0	1.000
San Sebastian Staglets	2	0	0.667
EAC–ICA Brigadiers	1	2	.333
Arellano Braves	0	3	.000

Qualified to the finals

Teams
Teams	1	2	3
Arellano	SSC-R school colors	UPHD school colors	EAC school colors
EAC	UPHD school colors	SSC-R school colors	Arellano school colors
San Sebastian	EAC school colors	Arellano school colors	UPHD school colors
Perpetual	Arellano school colors	EAC school colors	SSC-R school colors

==== Finals ====
Date		Score		Set 1	Set 2	Set 3	Set 4	Set 5	Total
Jan 20	**Perpetual Junior Altas**	**3 –1**	San Sebastian Staglets	25–19	25–17	23–25	25–15	–	**98–76**
Jan 27	**Perpetual Junior Altas**	**3 –0**	San Sebastian Staglets	–	–	–	–	–	–
**UPHSD wins series 2–0**

== Football ==
=== Men's tournament ===
==== First round ====
Team	W	D	L	GF	GA	GD	Pts.
San Beda Red Lions	5	0	0	31	1	+30	15
Benilde Blazers	4	0	1	25	4	+21	12
Arellano Chiefs	2	1	2	24	8	+16	7
EAC Generals	1	1	3	3	6	−3	4
Mapúa Cardinals	1	0	3	2	25	−23	3
Perpetual Altas	1	0	4	4	45	−41	3

Qualified to the finals

==== Second round ====
Team	W	D	L	GF	GA	GD	Pts.
San Beda Red Lions	3	0	0	9	0	+9	9
Benilde Blazers	2	0	0	21	1	+20	6
Arellano Chiefs	1	0	1	9	4	+5	3
EAC Generals	1	0	1	4	4	0	3
Perpetual Altas	0	0	2	0	17	−17	0
Mapúa Cardinals	0	0	2	0	18	−18	0

Qualified to the finals

=== Schedule ===
Teams	Round 1					Round 2				
Teams	1	2	3	4	5	6	7	8	9	10
AU	CSB school colors	EAC school colors	San Beda school colors	UPHD school colors	Mapua school colors	Mapua school colors	EAC school colors	CSB school colors	San Beda school colors	UPHD school colors
Benilde	Mapua school colors	Arellano school colors	UPHD school colors	EAC school colors	San Beda school colors	Mapua school colors	UPHD school colors	Arellano school colors	EAC school colors	San Beda school colors
EAC	UPHD school colors	San Beda school colors	Arellano school colors	CSB school colors	Mapua school colors	San Beda school colors	Arellano school colors	UPHD school colors	CSB school colors	Mapua school colors
MIT	CSB school colors	UPHD school colors	San Beda school colors	EAC school colors	Arellano school colors	CSB school colors	San Beda school colors	Arellano school colors	UPHD school colors	EAC school colors
SBC	EAC school colors	Mapua school colors	Arellano school colors	CSB school colors	UPHD school colors	UPHD school colors	Mapua school colors	EAC school colors	Arellano school colors	CSB school colors
Perpetual	EAC school colors	Mapua school colors	CSB school colors	Arellano school colors	San Beda school colors	San Beda school colors	CSB school colors	EAC school colors	Mapua school colors	Arellano school colors

Win
Draw
Loss

=== Juniors' tournament ===
==== Elimination round ====
Team	W	D	L	Pts.
La Salle Green Hills Greenies	5	1	0	16
San Beda Red Cubs	5	1	0	16
Arellano Braves	4	0	2	12
EAC–ICA Brigadiers	3	0	3	9
Perpetual Junior Altas	2	0	4	6
Mapúa Red Robins	1	0	5	3
**Letran Squires**	0	0	6	0

Season host is boldfaced.

Qualified to the semifinals

Teams
Teams	1	2	3	4	5	6
AU	CSB school colors	EAC school colors	San Beda school colors	UPHD school colors	Letran school colors	Mapua school colors
CSJL	San Beda school colors	EAC school colors	Mapua school colors	UPHD school colors	CSB school colors	Arellano school colors
EAC	UPHD school colors	San Beda school colors	Letran school colors	Arellano school colors	CSB school colors	Mapua school colors
LSGH	Mapua school colors	Arellano school colors	UPHD school colors	EAC school colors	Letran school colors	San Beda school colors
MHSS	CSB school colors	UPHD school colors	Letran school colors	San Beda school colors	EAC school colors	Arellano school colors
SBC	Letran school colors	EAC school colors	Mapua school colors	Arellano school colors	CSB school colors	UPHD school colors
Perpetual	EAC school colors	Mapua school colors	CSB school colors	Letran school colors	Arellano school colors	San Beda school colors

Win
Draw
Loss

==== Semifinals ====
Team	W	D	L	Pts.
Arellano Braves	2	0	2	**6**
San Beda Red Cubs	1	0	1	**3**
La Salle Green Hills Greenies	1	0	1	**3**
EAC–ICA Brigadiers	2	0	2	**0**

Season host is boldfaced.

Qualified to the finals

Teams
Teams	1	2	3
**Arellano**	CSB school colors	San Beda school colors	EAC school colors
**LSGH**	Arellano school colors	EAC school colors	San Beda school colors
**EAC**	San Beda school colors	CSB school colors	Arellano school colors
**San Beda**	EAC school colors	Arellano school colors	CSB school colors

Win
Draw
Loss

== Beach Volleyball ==
=== Men's tournament ===
Team	W	L	PCT
Arellano Chiefs	8	0	1.000
Letran Knights	7	1	.875
Perpetual Altas	6	2	.750
Benilde Blazers	5	3	.625
San Beda Red Lions	4	4	.500
JRU Heavy Bombers	3	5	.375
EAC Generals	2	6	.250
**Mapúa Cardinals**	1	7	.125
San Sebastian Stags	0	8	.000

Season host is boldfaced.

Qualified to the semifinals

==== Bracket ====
Semifinals
1	**Arellano**	**2**
4	Benilde	0
2	**Perpetual**	**2**
3	Letran	1

Finals
1	**Arellano**	**2**
2	Perpetual	0

==== Finals ====
September 5 – La Salle Green Hills sand court, Mandaluyong
Team	1	2	Sets
Perpetual	12	17	**0**
**Arellano**	21	21	**2**

=== Juniors' tournament ===
Team	W	L	PCT
Perpetual Junior Altas	7	0	1.000
San Sebastian Staglets	6	1	.857
EAC–ICA Brigadiers	4	3	.571
San Beda Red Cubs	4	3	.571
La Salle Green Hills Greenies	3	4	.429
Arellano Braves	3	4	.429
Letran Squires	1	6	.143
JRU Light Bombers	0	7	.000

Season host is boldfaced.

Qualified to the semifinals

==== Bracket ====
Semifinals
1	**Perpetual**	**2**
4	San Beda	0
2	**San Sebastian**	**2**
3	EAC	0

Finals
1	**Perpetual**	**2**
2	San Sebastian	0

==== Finals ====
September 5 – La Salle Green Hills sand court, Mandaluyong
Team	1	2	Sets
**Perpetual**	23	21	**2**
San Sebastian	21	10	**0**

=== Women's tournament ===
Team	W	L	PCT
Perpetual Lady Altas	8	0	1.000
Benilde Lady Blazers	7	1	.875
Letran Lady Knights	6	2	.750
EAC Lady Generals	4	4	.500
Arellano Lady Chiefs	4	4	.500
JRU Lady Bombers	3	5	.375
San Beda Red Lionesses	3	5	.375
San Sebastian Lady Stags	1	7	.125
**Mapúa Lady Cardinals**	0	8	.000

Season host is boldfaced.
EAC advanced by virtue of a 2–0 win over Arellano during the elimination round.

Qualified to the semifinals

==== Bracket ====
Semifinals
1	**Perpetual**	**2**
4	EAC	0
2	Benilde	1
3	**Letran**	**2**

Finals
1	**Perpetual**	**2**
3	Letran	0

==== Finals ====
September 5 – La Salle Green Hills sand court, Mandaluyong
Team	1	2	Sets
**Perpetual**	21	21	**2**
Letran	19	18	**0**

== Chess ==
=== Seniors Division ===
Team	W	D	L	Pts.
Benilde Blazers	16	0	0	55.5
Letran Knights	12	1	3	51
San Sebastian Stags	12	0	3	49.5
Mapúa Cardinals	6	2	8	26
EAC Generals	3	4	9	25
**San Beda Red Lions**	6	3	7	24.5
Perpetual Altas	4	2	10	22.5
Arellano Chiefs	2	2	12	19
JRU Heavy Bombers	3	0	13	15.5

Season host is boldfaced.

CSB won all of their games to become automatic champions.

==== Awardees ====
- MVP: Joel Pimentel, Jr. (CSB)

=== Juniors' Division ===
Team	W	D	L	Pts.
Letran Squires	13	2	1	50.5
La Salle Green Hills Greenies	12	4	0	50
San Sebastian Staglets	10	3	3	48
Arellano Braves	9	5	2	47
EAC–ICA Brigadiers	7	3	6	33
Perpetual Junior Altas	6	1	9	28.5
**San Beda Red Cubs**	2	1	13	13.5
JRU Light Bombers	2	1	13	12
Mapúa Red Robins	0	2	14	5.5

Season host is boldfaced.

Qualified to the finals

==== Finals ====
Team	1	2	3	4	Total
Letran	0	0	1	½	**1½**
LSGH	1	1	0	½	**2½**

==== Awardees ====
- MVP: Giovanni Mejia (LSGH)

== Swimming ==
=== Seniors Division ===
Team	Prelims	Finals	Total
San Beda Red Lions	641.5	607	1248.5
Benilde Blazers	270.25	99.5	369.75
Mapúa Cardinals	235.5	85	320.5
EAC Generals	143.5	53.5	197
San Sebastian Stags	138.25	23	161.25
Arellano Chiefs	78.75	6	84.75
Perpetual Altas	44.75	22	66.75

=== Juniors Division ===
Team	Prelims	Finals	Total
La Salle Green Hills Greenies	578.5	479	1057.5
San Sebastian Staglets	329.5	154	483.5
EAC–ICA Brigadiers	153.5	122	275.5
Perpetual Junior Altas	189.5	74	263.5
San Beda Red Cubs	147	16	163
Mapúa Red Robins	65.5	49	114.5
Arellano Braves	80	6	86

=== Women's Division (Demonstration Sport) ===
Team	Prelims	Finals	Total
Benilde Lady Blazers	183.5	149	332.5
EAC Lady Generals	115	65	180
San Sebastian Lady Stags	102	67	169
Arellano Lady Chiefs	70	16	86
JRU Lady Bombers	45	3	48

== Table Tennis ==
=== Seniors Division ===
Team	MP	W	L
San Beda Red Lions	22	11	0
Benilde Blazers	20	9	2
Letran Knights	18	7	4
San Sebastian Stags	16	5	6
Perpetual Altas	12	4	4
Mapúa Cardinals	10	2	6
EAC Generals	10	2	6
Arellano Chiefs	10	2	6
**JRU Heavy Bombers**	8	0	8

Season host is boldfaced.

Qualified to the finals

=== Women's Division ===
Team	MP	W	L
Benilde Lady Blazers	18	9	0
San Beda Red Lionesses	15	6	3
Letran Lady Knights	15	6	3
EAC Lady Generals	9	3	3
Arellano Lady Chiefs	8	2	4
San Sebastian Lady Stags	7	1	5
**JRU Lady Bombers**	6	0	6

Season host is boldfaced.

Qualified to the finals

=== Juniors Division ===
Team	MP	W	L
San Beda Red Cubs	22	11	0
Arellano Braves	20	9	2
Letran Squires	18	7	4
San Sebastian Staglets	16	5	6
EAC–ICA Brigadiers	12	4	4
**JRU Light Bombers**	11	3	5
La Salle Green Hills Greenies	10	2	6
Perpetual Junior Altas	9	1	7
Mapúa Red Robins	8	0	8

Season host is boldfaced.

== Taekwondo ==
The NCAA Taekwondo Championships was held on January 25, 2010 at Filoil Flying V Arena in San Juan.

=== Men's tournament ===
Team	Medals				Points
Team	1st place, gold medalist(s)	2nd place, silver medalist(s)	3rd place, bronze medalist(s)	Total	Points
San Beda					421.5
Benilde					287.33
San Sebastian					249.08

=== Women's tournament ===
Team	Medals				Points
Team	1st place, gold medalist(s)	2nd place, silver medalist(s)	3rd place, bronze medalist(s)	Total	Points
San Beda					313.37
Benilde					262.5
Letran					234.8

=== Juniors' tournament ===
Team	Medals				Points
Team	1st place, gold medalist(s)	2nd place, silver medalist(s)	3rd place, bronze medalist(s)	Total	Points
Benilde					
San Beda					
Letran					

== Lawn Tennis ==
=== Men's tournament ===
Team	W	L
Letran Knights	5	0
Benilde Blazers	5	0
Perpetual Altas	4	1
San Beda Red Lions	2	3
San Sebastian Stags	3	2
Arellano Chiefs	3	3
JRU Heavy Bombers	2	4
Mapúa Cardinals	0	5
EAC Generals	0	6

Teams
Teams	1	2	3	4	5	6	7	8
AU	San Beda school colors	UPHD school colors	CSB school colors					
CSJL	San Beda school colors	EAC school colors						CSB school colors
Benilde	icon school colors	Arellano school colors						Letran school colors
EAC	icon school colors	SSC-R school colors	Letran school colors					
JRU	UPHD school colors	Mapua school colors	SSC-R school colors					
MIT	SSC-R school colors	JRU school colors	San Beda school colors					
SBC	Arellano school colors	Letran school colors	Mapua school colors					
San Sebastian	Mapua school colors	EAC school colors	JRU school colors					
Perpetual	JRU school colors	Arellano school colors						

Win
Loss

=== Juniors tournament ===
Team	W	L
San Beda Red Cubs	7	0
San Sebastian Staglets	5	1
Letran Squires	5	1
La Salle Green Hills Greenies	3	3
Arellano Braves	2	4
Perpetual Junior Altas	2	4
EAC–ICA Brigadiers	0	5
Mapúa Red Robins	0	5

Teams
Teams	1	2	3	4	5	6	7
AU	UPHD school colors	San Beda school colors	Mapua school colors				
CSJL	EAC school colors	UPHD school colors	San Beda school colors				
EAC	Letran school colors	CSB school colors	SSC-R school colors				
Benilde	Mapua school colors	EAC school colors	SSC-R school colors				
MIT	CSB school colors	SSC-R school colors	Arellano school colors				
SBC	SSC-R school colors	Arellano school colors	Letran school colors				
San Sebastian	San Beda school colors	Mapua school colors	CSB school colors	EAC school colors			
Perpetual	Arellano school colors	Letran school colors					

Win
Loss

== Cheerleading ==
The NCAA Cheerleading Competition was held on October 1, 2010 at the Filoil Flying V Arena. The affair was covered live by Studio 23 and was hosted by Gretchen Fullido and the various NCAA courtside reporters.

Order	Squad	Score
9th	UPHSD PerpSquad	300.0
5th	Mapua Cheerping Cardinals	290.5
8th	JRU Pep Squad	289.5
6th	Golden Stags Cheerleading Squad	275.0
7th	EAC Pep Squad	268.0
2nd	Letran Cheerleading Team	267.0
3rd	Arellano Pep Squad	246.5
4th	CSB Pep Squad	239.5
1st	San Beda Red Corps	166.5

=== Awards ===
NCAA Season 86 cheerleading champions

== General Tally ==
Pts.	Position
40	Champion
35	2nd
30	3rd
25	4th
20	5th
10	6th
9	7th
8	8th
4	9th
N/A	Did not join

=== Seniors' Division ===
Rank	School	Basketball	Men's Volleyball	Women's volleyball	Chess	Swimming	Football	Men's table tennis	Women's table tennis	Lawn tennis	Men's beach volleyball	Women's beach volleyball	Men's Taekwondo	Women's Taekwondo	Track and field	Pts.
1	SBC	40	30	20	10	30	25	40	25	25	20	9	25	25	8	330
2	CSJL	20	25	35	25	N/A	N/A	30	20	40	35	35	8	10	35	328
3	Benilde	8	20	5	40	35	20	35	30	35	25	30	20	20	10	322
4	San Sebastian	35	6	40	30	8	N/A	25	6	20	4	6	10	4	30	224
5	Perpetual	5	40	5	8	4	--	20	N/A	30	30	40	N/A	N/A	10	192
6	AU	10	35	20	6	6	--	6	8	10	40	20	6	8	6	181
7	EAC	5	10	30	20	10	--	8	10	4	8	25	4	6	4	144
8	MIT	25	4	8	25	20	--	10	N/A	6	6	4	N/A	N/A	20	128
9	JRU	30	8	10	4	N/A	N/A	4	4	8	10	9	N/A	N/A	40	127

=== Juniors' Division ===
#	High School	Basketball	Volleyball	Chess	Swimming	Football	Table tennis	Lawn tennis	Men's beach volleyball	Taekwondo	Track and field	Points
1	San Sebastian	35	30	30	30	N/A	25	25	30	25	40	270.00
2	LSGH	18.3	4	40	35	30	8	20	9	30	30	224.30
3	San Beda	40	8	8	10	25	40	35	20	8	8	202.00
4	EAC	6	25	20	25	--	20	4	25	10	35	180.00
5	Perpetual	30	25	10	20	8	6	8	35	N/A	20	172.00
6	Letran	18.3	10	35	N/A	4	30	20	6	20	10	163.30
7	Arellano	4	20	25	6	--	35	10	9	4	25	163.00
8	MHSS	8	6	4	8	6	4	6	N/A	6	6	54.00
9	JRU	18.3	N/A	6	4	N/A	10	N/A	4	N/A	4	46.30

== General Championship race ==
Season host is boldfaced.

Note: This is as of February 22, 2011.

=== Juniors' Division ===
Rank	Team	Total
1	**San Sebastian Staglets**	230.00
2	San Beda Red Cubs	169.00
3	La Salle Green Hills Greenies	164.30
4	Letran Squires	149.30
5	Perpetual Junior Altas	144.00
6	EAC–ICA Brigadiers	135.00
7	Arellano Braves	113.00
8	JRU Light Bombers	42.30
9	Mapúa Red Robins	42.00

=== Seniors' Division ===
Rank	Team	Total
1	San Beda Red Lions	337
2	Letran Knights	328
3	Benilde Blazers	323
4	**San Sebastian Stags**	224
5	Perpetual Altas	206
6	Arellano Chiefs	191
7	EAC Generals	152
8	Mapúa Cardinals	139
9	JRU Heavy Bombers	127

== See also ==
- UAAP Season 73
