= Arellano Chiefs, Lady Chiefs and Braves =

Athletic team of Arellano University

Arellano Chiefs and Lady Chiefs
- School: Arellano University
- League: NCAA
- Joined: NAASCU: 2001-02; NCRAA: 2005-09; NCAA: 2009-present
- Location: Manila, Philippines
- Team colors: Blue, Red and Silver
- Women's team: Lady Chiefs
- Juniors' team: Braves

Seniors' general championships
- NCAA: none

Juniors' general championships
- NCAA: none

The Arellano University Chiefs and Lady Chiefs are the athletic teams of Arellano University's varsity program. The university is a member of the National Collegiate Athletic Association (NCAA) and the National Capital Region Athletic Association (NCRAA). Its program includes several intercollegiate varsity sports teams for women and men.

== History ==
Originally known as the Arellano Flaming Arrows, the team won the National Student's Championship (NSC) in the 1970s. Years later, the Chiefs entered the best-of-three finals in the men's basketball division of the NCRAA in 2006 when they were defeated by the Saint Francis of Assisi College Doves. In a repeat finals appearance in 2007, head coach Leo Isaac finally led the Chiefs to the championship with a 67–64 game three win against the EAC Generals. The Chiefs relied on their defense to stop EAC's Ronjay Buenafe, while supporters of the rival teams had to be restrained inside the Rizal Memorial Coliseum. The then Baby Chiefs also defeated the Olivarez College juniors team in their own title series to ensure both NCRAA basketball titles would go to their Juan Sumulong Campus.

In 2008, the Chiefs reigned anew against 2006 tormentor St. Francis in two games., while the Baby Chiefs also swept the Dovelets in juniors' competition to keep both basketball trophies. The Chiefs' NCRAA championship caused their qualification to the 2008 Philippine Collegiate Championship for basketball. In the PCC, they defeated UCN Golden Dragons in the first round, but they were eliminated in the quarterfinals by three-peat NCAA champions San Beda Red Lions.

The Chiefs were able to qualify anew for the 2009 NCRAA finals, but they were defeated by upstarts Universal College Golden Dragons in overtime to deny the Chiefs of a third consecutive championship, while the Baby Chiefs were luckier as they defeated the Rizal Technological University Baby Thunders to clinch their third consecutive championship.

The Chiefs are also the reigning three-time Fr. Martin Cup champions, their last championship coming in 2009 against Philippine Merchant Marine School.

With the departure of Philippine Christian University (PCU) Dolphins after exposure of several juniors' players enrolling with forged documents, the NCAA originally opened its doors for new members, and Arellano was one of the schools that lodged their application. Arellano was named as one of the frontrunners, but the NCAA Policy Board fail to garner enough number of votes to admit a new member which closed the doors for new members for their 2009–10 season.

However, the NCAA invited "guest teams" instead, and Arellano, along with the AUF Great Danes and fellow NCRAA member EAC Generals were accepted as guest teams for the 2009–10 season, where they are also eligible to win championships.

The Chiefs finished their 2009 campaigned fifth, the best among the guest teams, with an 8–10 record. At the end of the tournament, Giorgio Ciriacruz was named as part of the Mythical Five (all-NCAA team), the only player from a guest team to be named in the five-member roster.

On the NCAA Season 86, Arellano has upgraded from its guest to probationary status. While on the Season 87 of NCAA, Isiah Ciriacruz won't play for the season due to a sustained injury and Adrian Celada was named as team captain. The school became a regular member of the league during the 89th Season, on April 2, 2013.

== Basketball ==
CHIEFS NCAA Season 102

Arellano Chiefs roster
Players
Coaches

Pos.	No.	Nat.	Name	Height	Year	High School
G	0	(Philippines)	Manansala,, Aaron Dywane	6'0" (1.83m)	–	–
PG	1	(Philippines)	Ongotan, T-Mc	5'9" (1.75m)	–	–
PG	3	(Philippines)	Geronimo, Ernest	5'11" (1.8m)	–	–
C	4	(Philippines)	Libang, Charles	6'5" (1.96m)	–	–
F	5	(Philippines)	Valencia,, Sebastian	6'4" (1.93m)	–	San Beda University
PG	7	(Philippines)	Langit, Matthew	6'0" (1.83m)	–	–
PG	9	(Philippines)	Camay, Yuan Jerico	5'10" (1.78m)	–	–
C	10	(Philippines)	Buenaventura, Leyton	6'5" (1.96m)	–	–
G	12	(Philippines)	Abiera, Renzo	6'4" (1.93m)	–	NUNS
G	13	(Philippines)	Cabotaje, Anjord	5'11" (1.8m)	–	–
F	14	(Philippines)	Vinoya, King (C)	6'4" (1.93m)	–	–
PG	16	(Philippines)	De Leon, Joaquim	5'11" (1.8m)	–	–
F	17	(Philippines)	Flores, Karl	6'4" (1.93m)	–	–
G	19	(Philippines)	Anama, Kyle Matthew	6'2" (1.88m)	–	–
G	20	(Philippines)	Barraca, Prince	6'1" (1.85m)	–	–
G	25	(Philippines)	Borromeo, Anthony	6'0" (1.83m)	–	–
G	41	(Philippines)	Ladica, John Ray	6'1" (1.85m)	–	–
F	42	(Philippines)	Hernal, Joseph	6'2" (1.88m)	–	–

Head coach

- (Philippines) Chico Manabat

Assistant coach(es)

- (Philippines) John Necessito
- (Philippines) Kenyon Chee
- (Philippines) Jesse Mapanao
- (Philippines) Anthony Urbano

Legend

- (C) Team captain
- Injured

BRAVES NCAA Season 102

Arellano Juniors roster
Players
Coaches

Pos.	No.	Nat.	Name	Height	Year	High School
PG	1	(Philippines)	Castro, Hance	5'10" (1.78m)	–	–
G	2	(Philippines)	Acain, Mathew	–	–	–
PG	3	(Philippines)	Barinque, Kin	5'7" (1.7m)	–	–
G	5	(Philippines)	Garing, Kyle	5'7" (1.7m)	–	–
PG	6	(Philippines)	Trinos, Kyle	–	–	–
F	8	(Philippines)	Ferriols, Hugo	6'2" (1.88m)	–	–
G	9	(Philippines)	Mabbayad, Mathaniel	–	–	–
G	10	(Philippines)	Langit, Derrek	–	–	–
G	11	(Philippines)	Cabantac, Angelo	–	–	–
F	13	(Philippines)	Lugo, Angelo	6'3" (1.91m)	–	–
F	15	(Philippines)	Tan, Prince	–	–	–
G	16	(Philippines)	Pillas, Laurence (C)	5'11" (1.8m)	–	–
G	19	(Philippines)	Sapo, Jermaine	6'0" (1.83m)	–	–
C	22	(Philippines)	Teoc, Tristan	–	–	–
F	28	(Philippines)	Dalaten, Zaqueo	6'1" (1.85m)	–	–
G	31	(Philippines)	Angeles, Thadeus	5'4" (1.63m)	–	–
PG	33	(Philippines)	Garan, Ronie	–	–	–
C	47	(Philippines)	Asay, Ian	6'4" (1.93m)	–	–

Head coach

Anthony Urbano

Legend

- (C) Team captain
- Injured

=== Notable players ===
- Keith Agovida
- Leonard "Bimbot" Anquilo
- Justin Arana (Won Defensive Player of the Year, Rookie of the Year, All-Defensive Team and Mythical Five selection)
- Lee Boliver
- Andrian Celada (The first Arellano player to win an award in their NCAA stint earning two Mythical Five selections in seasons 85 and 86.)
- Gio Ciriacruz
- Isiah Ciriacruz
- Tylon Darjuan
- Orlando Daroya
- Gerald Espinosa
- Cade Flores (Won Defensive Player of the Year, Rookie of the Year, All-Defensive Team and Mythical Five selection all in his only playing year)
- James Forrester (Skipped final three years of eligibility to play professionally)
- Dioncee Holts
- Jio Jalalon (Skipped final two years of eligibility to play professionally; Led the Chiefs to two finals appearances in 2014 and 2016.)
- Alfie Martinez
- Jordan Melaño
- John Pinto
- Jade Talampas
- Allen Virtudazo

== Volleyball ==
The volleyball team of the team are already a powerhouse once it joined it 2009. Currently, the women's volleyball has 2 straight finals appearances (Season 89, and 90) which, in the 90th season, they became the champion. And 1 finals appearance in the men's tournament (Season 86). They are now listed as one of the greatest teams in Philippine Collegiate Volleyball.

=== Women's volleyball roster ===
NCAA Season 95

Arellano Lady Chiefs
No.	Name	Position
1	Adante, Kristine Claire	S
2	Diño, Charmina	
3	Bello, Princess	
4	Manuntag, Janice	
5	Cuenca, Cherry Mae	L
7	Daisog, Alliah Grace	L
8	San Gregorio, Alyana Marie	
9	Sasuman, Nicole Victoria	
10	Paralejas, Donnalyn Mae	S
11	Batindaan, Dodee Risa Joy	
13	Abay, Trina Marice	
14	De Guzman, Pauline	
15	Donato, Carla Amaina (c)	MB
19	Matawaran, Robbie Mae	
	Padillon, Marianne Lei Angelique (r)	
	Pecaña, Lorraine (r)	
	Roberto Javier	HC

Arellano Lady Chiefs roster
No.	Name	Position
2	DINO, Charmina	Outside Spiker
3	ORTIZ, Joyce Marie	Outside Spiker
4	JUANICH, Mikaela O.	Middle Blocker
6	VERUTIAO, Sarah Princess (c)	Setter
7	FLORES, Faye Anne Marie	Libero
8	SAN GREGORIO, Allyna Marie	Outside Spiker
9	BUEMIA, Cherry Anne	Libero
10	PARALEJAS, Donnalyn Mae	Outside Spiker
11	ABAY, Tricia Marice	Middle Blocker
12	EBUEN, Necole	Opposite Spiker
13	AROCHA, Regine Anne	Outside Spiker
14	SASUMAN, Nicole Victoria	Outside Spiker
15	DONATO, Carla Amiana	Middle Blocker
17	DAISOG, Alliah Grace	Setter

- Head coach: Roberto "Obet" Javier
- Assistant coach: Richard Estacio

NCAA Season 91

Jersey No.	Name	Position
2	Rialen Sante	Outside Spiker
4	Angelica Macabalitao	Middle blocker
5	Rhea Marist Ramirez	Setter
6	Andrea Marzan	Outside Spiker
7	Maria Erica Calixto	Opposite Spiker
8	Jenicalynne Tan	Setter
9	Jan Eunice Shayne Galang	Libero
10	Maria Angela Sanchez	Libero
11	Angelica Sawali	Outside Spiker
13	Regine Anne Arocha	Outside Spiker
14	Danna Henson	Outside Spiker
16	Shirley Salamagos	Middle Blocker
17	Christine Joy Rosario	Middle Blocker
18	Jovielyn Grace Pardo	Outside Spiker

- Head coach: Roberto "Obet" Javier

=== Men's volleyball roster ===
NCAA Season 93

Arellano Chiefs roster
No.	Name	Position
2	LIBERATO, Kevin C.	Middle Blocker
3	LAPUZ, Demy Freedom M.	
4	DOMINGO, Roi C.	
5	MENESES, Edmark F.	Setter
7	ARELLANO, Tonnel L.	
8	CABILLAN, John Joseph R.	
9	SEGOVIA, Christian Joshua A.	Middle Blocker
10	ESGUERRA, Joshua C.	Libero
11	ARELLANO, Keanu L.	
12	BLANCO, John Christian T.	Libero
14	CACCAM, Junnel P.	
15	DELA PAZ, Christian B.	
16	SORIANO, Christopher Vhal (c)	
17	LIBERATO, Jesrael C.	
18	MANALANSAN, Timoti Jhon E.	Reserve
19	SANTO, Daryl P.	Reserve

- Head coach: Sherwin Meneses
- Assistant coach: Bryan Vitug

NCAA Season 91 men's line-up

#	Name	Position
2.)	Kevin Liberato	Middle blocker
3.)	Benrasid Latip	
4.)	Rishnan Jed Digal	
6.)	Tonell Arellano	Libero
7.)	Sanny Sarino	
8.)	John Joseph Cabillan	
9.)	Christian Joshua Segovia	
10.)	Kenneth Aliyacyac	Outside Spiker
11.)	Keanu Arellano	
12.)	Lawrence del Esperito	
13.)	Daryl Santo	
16.)	Christopher Vital Soriano	
17.)	Dan Carlo dela Cruz	Libero
18.)	Edmark Meneses	

- Head coach: Sherwin Meneses

=== Juniors' basketball roster ===
NCAA Season 102 juniors' line-up

#	Name
1.)	Castro, Hance
2.)	Acain, Mathew
3.)	Barinque, Kin
5.)	Garing, Kyle
6.)	Trinos, Kyle
8.)	Ferriols, Hugo
9.)	Mabbayad, Mathaniel
10.)	Langit, Derrek
11.)	Cabantac, Angelo
13.)	Lugo, Angelo
15.)	Tan, Prince
16.)	Pillas, Laurence
19.)	Sapo, Jermaine
22.)	Teoc, Tristan
28.)	Dalaten, Zaqueo
31.)	Angeles, Thadeus
33.)	Garan, Ronie
47.)	Asay, Ian

- Head coach: Sherwin Meneses

=== Beach volleyball ===
NCAA Season 93

Women's

- Princess O. Bello
- Sarah Princess T. Verutiao
- Glydel Anne Liu

Men's

- Christian B. Dela Paz
- Demy Freedom M. Lapuz
- Joshua C. Esguerra

Juniors

- Jesus Valdez
- Adrian Villados
- Zachary Dablo (reserve)

=== Notable players ===
Women's Division

- NCAA Season 93 champions
Jovielyn Prado, Mary Anne Esguerra (c), Princess Bello, Meredith Balanova, Rhea Ramirez, Sarah Verutiao, Faye Flores, Glydel Liu, Cherry Buemia, Necole Ebuen, Regine Arocha, Andrea Marzan, Carla Donato, Eunika Torres, head coach: Roberto "Obet" Javier
- NCAA Season 92 champions
Jovielyn Prado (c), Mary Anne Esguerra, Princess Bello, Meredith Balanova, Rhea Ramirez, Sarah Verutiao, Faye Flores, Glydel Liu, Cherry Buemia, Regine Arocha, Andrea Marzan, Carla Donato, Eunika Torres, head coach: Roberto "Obet" Javier
- NCAA Season 90 champions
- Jovielyn Grace Prado

- NCAA Season 92 2nd Best Outside Spiker and Finals' MVP
- NCAA Season 93 1st Best Outside Spiker

- Rhea Marist Ramirez

- NCAA Season 91 Best Setter
- 2017 PVL Collegiate Conference Best Setter

- Regine Anne Arocha

- NCAA Season 93 Best Opposite Spiker and Finals' MVP
- 2017 PVL Collegiate Conference 2nd Best Outside Spiker

- Necole Ebuen

- NCAA Season 93 Rookie of the Year

- Christine Joy Rosario

- NCAA Season 91 Best Spiker

- Diane Ticar
- Angelica Legacion
- Elaine Sagun
- Danna Henson
- Shirley Salamagos
- Menchie Tubiera

Men's Division

- John Joseph Cabillan

- NCAA Season 92 2nd Best Outside Spiker

- Kevin Liberato

- NCAA Season 92 1st Best Middle Blocker
- NCAA Season 93 1st Best Middle Blocker

- Christian Dela Paz

- NCAA Season 93 2nd Best Outside Spiker

- Carlo Lozada

Juniors' Division

- NCAA Season 93 beach volleyball champions

- Adrian Villados Jesus Valdez Zachary Dablo

- Adrian Villados

- NCAA Season 93 beach volleyball MVP

- Gideon James Guadalupe

- NCAA Season 93 2nd Best Middle Blocker

== Chess ==
The chess team of Arellano University has bagged two straight championships, being one of the top contenders in the area of this sport.

SENIORS ROSTER	JUNIORS ROSTER
Joshua Arias	Carl Jaedrianne Ancheta
Carlo Caranyagan	Don Laurence Cerujano
Alcon Paul Datu	James Michael Erese
Don Tyrone Delos Santos	Juwon Mikaelo Grande
Kyz Llantada	Kyle Jazz Ibañez
Jeremy Lorenz Parado	Paula Mae Lim
Miguel Niguel Peñero	Jasmine Zyrelle Navarez
Tucker Howard Viernes	John Roman Mapalad

Head Coach: Rudy Ibañez

== Taekwondo ==
SENIORS
Alvarez, Joey
Asmala, Hatim
Banaag, Edward
Dima, Abu-jandal
Gamay, Marco
Garcia, Louie
Indanan, Mosmer
Makedon, Philip
Manalata, Raimer
Mina, James
Muñoz, Justine
Muñoz, Lester
Ocampo, Ervin
Polentisima, Ezra
Rasad, Wasber
Santos, Ivanne

Head Coach: Carlos Padilla
