= AUF Great Danes =

- School: Angeles University Foundation
- League: UCLAA
- Joined: NCAA: Guest team for 2009–10
- Location: Angeles City, Philippines
- Team colors: Blue and white
- Women's team: Lady Danes
- Juniors' team: Baby Danes

Seniors' general championships
- NCAA: 0

Juniors' general championships
- NCAA: 0

The Angeles University Foundation (AUF) Great Danes are the varsity teams of Angeles University Foundation of Angeles City, Philippines.

They played as a guest team in the 2009–10 season of the National Collegiate Athletic Association (Philippines). Their men's basketball team won the 2007 National Inter-Collegiate Basketball Championship held in Ibajay, Aklan. Their victory qualified them to the 6th Asian University Basketball Championship at Daet, Camarines Norte.

The Great Danes are now playing at the United Central Luzon Athletic Association.

== NCAA ==
With the expulsion of Philippine Christian University (PCU) Dolphins from the NCAA due to an anomaly of enrolling several high school student-athletes with forged documents, a vacant membership slot existed. AUF was one of the schools that filed their application for membership to fill up the vacant slot. However, the NCAA Policy Board voted to delay the decision to accept a new member so 2009–10 season was held minus one school.

However, the NCAA invited "guest teams" instead, and AUF along with Arellano University and the Emilio Aguinaldo College, were accepted as guest teams for the 2009–10 season. Thou they were only guest teams; they were also eligible to win championships.

Enrico Gascon was head coach of the Angeles University Foundation (AUF) Great Danes basketball varsity team that played in NCAA 2009–10 season. He placed emphasis on speed and outside shooting as the weapon of the AUF team. Prior to the announcement of their participation as guest teams, the Great Danes also participated in the Fr. Martin's Cup.

The men's basketball team finished last in the 2009–10 NCAA season, with a 2–16 record, winning against fellow guest school EAC in their second game, and against the UPHSD Altas in their last game. The junior's basketball team, on the other hand, finished winless in 18 games. AUF fared better in volleyball, qualifying in the semifinals for the men's tournament where they finished third, and in the juniors' division where they also finished third; they finished sixth in the women's tournament.
