= NCAA Season 85 =

- Host school: San Beda College
- Tagline: "Winning Drive at 85"

General
- Seniors: Letran Knights
- Juniors: San Sebastian Staglets

Seniors' champions
Sport		Men	Women
Basketball		San Sebastian	N/A
Volleyball		Letran	San Sebastian
Chess		Letran	
Taekwondo		San Beda	Letran (DS)
Table Tennis		San Beda	Benilde
Lawn Tennis		Letran	
Swimming		San Beda	Benilde (DS)
Beach Volleyball		Letran	Perpetual
Track and field		San Sebastian	N/A
Football		Benilde	N/A
Badminton		EAC (DS)	Benilde (DS)
Soft Tennis		N/A	San Beda (DS)
- Cheerdance: Perpetual (EX) (Ex - Coed)

Juniors' champions
Sport		Boys	Girls
Basketball		San Beda	N/A
Volleyball		Perpetual	
Chess		San Sebastian	
Taekwondo		LSGH	
Table Tennis		San Beda	
Lawn Tennis		San Beda	
Swimming		LSGH	
Beach Volleyball		Perpetual	
Track and field		San Sebastian	
Football		LSGH	
Badminton		LSGH (DS)	
- (NT) = No tournament; (DS) = Demonstration Sport; (Ex) = Exhibition;

NCAA Season 85 was the 2009–10 season of the National Collegiate Athletic Association (NCAA) of the Philippines. The host for this year was San Beda College (SBC).

The season began on June 27 at the Araneta Coliseum with United States Ambassador to the Philippines Kristie Kenney delivered the keynote speech, followed by a tripleheader of seniors' basketball games. The juniors' basketball tournament tipped off at the San Juan Gym with the remaining first round of eliminations games in basketball held at the Filoil Flying V Arena. Other sporting events were held at Philippine Sports Commission venues such as the Rizal Memorial Sports Complex.

== New member ==
With the Philippine Christian University (PCU) taking an indefinite leave of absence after the revelation of identity switching on their juniors' basketball team, the league began accepting candidates to take over PCU's spot. Emilio Aguinaldo College (EAC), Centro Escolar University (CEU), Angeles University Foundation (AUF), Arellano University and Lyceum of the Philippines University were the top candidates to join the league; other schools that were considered are Technological University of the Philippines and Don Bosco Technical College (a member of the NCAA South). Seeking to name a replacement before the year ends, the new school must have a high school varsity program, participate in all NCAA sports, undergo a three-year probationary period, and pay a PHP5 million membership fee.

Aside from assuring itself an 8-team roster for 2009, the league also envisions on having a 10-team league by 2010. PCU may still apply for membership but they will have to go through the same process as the other new applicants. League chairman for 2008-09 Ding Lozano of the Mapua Institute of Technology mentioned that Lyceum and EAC were the top contenders to be accepted in 2008.

On January 2, 2009, it was revealed that the choices were pared down to Lyceum, EAC and Arellano. However, after a month of delay, the policy board failed to garner a minimum number of votes to admit a new member; thus for this season, there will only be seven schools participating, while the schools that were considered will still be in contention for next season.

Prior to the Holy Week break, NCAA president Fr. Mat de Jesus, OSB announced that three schools were invited to compete as "guest teams" for the 2009–10 season, although he didn't mention the identities of the invited schools. Those that will accept invitations will still apply for full membership for the 2010–11 season. On April 21, newspapers announced that the three schools invited were Angeles University Foundation, Arellano University and Emilio Aguinaldo College. Lyceum's chances were said to be hurt with an absence of a high school varsity program. All three teams signified their intentions to participate as guest teams, paying the league 1.5 million pesos, plus a 500,000 peso-bond.

The Management Committee also decided that guest teams are eligible to win championships in the events they will participate at, and that their performance will be a part of their acceptance as full members.

== Demonstration sports ==
Olympic sports amateur boxing, archery and fencing will be contested as demonstration sports in the 2009–10 season. Boxing will be implemented with the help of the Amateur Boxing Association of the Philippines, with its secretary-general Patrick Gregorio saying that it is a welcome development.

== Basketball ==
=== Seniors' tournament ===
==== Elimination round ====
Pos	Team	W	L	PCT	GB	Qualification
1	San Beda Red Lions (H)	16	2	.889 (Note: First-seed playoff: San Beda 71–65 San Sebastian)	—	Twice-to-beat in the semifinals
2	San Sebastian Stags	16	2	.889	—	Twice-to-beat in the semifinals
3	JRU Heavy Bombers	15	3	.833	1	Twice-to-win in the semifinals
4	Letran Knights	12	6	.667	4	Twice-to-win in the semifinals
5	Arellano Chiefs (G)	8	10	.444	8	
6	EAC Generals (G)	6	12	.333 (Note: Head-to-head record: EAC 3–1, Mapúa 2–2, Benilde 1–3)	10	
7	Mapúa Cardinals	6	12	.333	10	
8	Benilde Blazers	6	12	.333	10	
9	Perpetual Altas	3	15	.167	13	
10	AUF Great Danes (G)	2	16	.111	14	

Source: ABS-CBN Sports
Rules for classification: 1) winning percentage; 2) if tied for top 4, one-game playoff; 3) head-to-head record; 4) overall point differential
(G) Guests; (H) Hosts

==== Bracket ====
Semifinals (Nos. 1 & 2 have twice-to-beat advantage)
1	San Beda	82
4	Letran	76
2	San Sebastian	61	79
3	JRU	68	64

Finals (Best-of-three series)
1	San Beda	68	61
2	San Sebastian	72**	76

**Double overtime

==== Awardees ====
- Most Valuable Player: John Wilson (JRU)
- Rookie of the Year: Sudan Daniel (San Beda)

=== Juniors' tournament ===
==== Elimination round ====
Pos	Team	W	L	PCT	GB	Qualification
1	San Beda Red Cubs (H)	17	1	.944 (Note: First-seed playoff: San Beda 91–77 Letran)	—	Twice-to-beat in the semifinals
2	Letran Squires	17	1	.944	—	Twice-to-beat in the semifinals
3	San Sebastian Staglets	13	5	.722	4	Twice-to-win in the semifinals
4	JRU Light Bombers	11	7	.611 (Note: Fourth-seed playoff: JRU 83–77 Perpetual)	6	Twice-to-win in the semifinals
5	Perpetual Junior Altas	11	7	.611	6	
6	La Salle Green Hills Greenies	8	10	.444	9	
7	Mapúa Red Robins	5	13	.278 (Note: Head-to-head point record: Malayan 1–1 Arellano (Malayan +3))	12	
8	Arellano Braves (G)	5	13	.278	12	
9	EAC–ICA Brigadiers (G)	3	15	.167	14	
10	AUF Baby Danes (G)	0	18	.000	17	

Source: ABS-CBN Sports
Rules for classification: 1) winning percentage; 2) if tied for top 4, one-game playoff; 3) head-to-head record; 5) overall point differential
(G) Guests; (H) Hosts

==== Bracket ====
Semifinals (Nos. 1 & 2 have twice-to-beat advantage)
1	San Beda	90
4	JRU	76
2	Letran	89
3	San Sebastian	84

Finals (Best-of-three series)
1	San Beda	98	80	86
2	Letran	75	83	75

==== Awardees ====
- Most Valuable Player: Louie Vigil (JRU)
- Rookie of the Year: Baser Amer (San Beda)

== Volleyball ==
Qualified to the Finals
Qualified to the semifinals

The volleyball tournaments commence on August 16, 2009, at the Ninoy Aquino Stadium. Subsequent games will then be held at the Emilio Aguinaldo College gym.

The old split-season format (winners of the first and second half of the season faced off in the best-of-3 finals) would not be used. Instead, the tournament will be a single round robin, with the top four advancing to another round robin semifinals, with best two teams going to the best-of-3 finals.

=== Men's tournament ===
==== Elimination round ====
Team	W	L	PCT	GB	Sets Ratio
Perpetual Altas	7	1	.875	--	3.286
**San Beda Red Lions**	7	1	.875	--	2.091
AUF Great Danes	5	3	.625	2	1.727
Letran Knights	4	4	.500	3	1.000
Benilde Blazers	4	4	.500	3	0.950
Arellano Chiefs	4	4	.500	3	0.722
San Sebastian Stags	4	4	.429	3	0.722
EAC Generals	2	6	.250	5	0.647
JRU Heavy Bombers	0	8	.000	7	0.143

Season host is boldfaced. Guest teams are italicized.

==== Semifinals ====
Team	W	L	PCT	GB	Sets			Points		
Team	W	L	PCT	GB	Won	Lost	Ratio	Won	Lost	Ratio
**San Beda Red Lions**	3	0	1.000	--	9	2	4.000	269	234	1.150
Letran Knights	2	1	.667	1	8	6	1.333	322	296	1.088
AUF Great Danes	1	2	.333	2	4	8	0.500	260	288	0.903
Perpetual Altas	0	3	.000	3	4	9	0.444	268	301	0.890

==== Finals ====
Date		Score		Set 1	Set 2	Set 3	Set 4	Set 5	Total
11 Oct	San Beda Red Lions	**2–3**	**Letran Knights**	23–25	25–17	25–11	23–25	17–19	**113–97**
15 Oct	**San Beda Red Lions**	**3–1**	Letran Knights	22–25	25–16	26–24	25–22		**98–87**
18 Oct	San Beda Red Lions	**2–3**	**Letran Knights**	27–29	25–22	21–25	28–26	11–15	**112–117**
Letran wins series 2–1

=== Women's tournament ===
==== Elimination round ====
Team	W	L	PCT	GB
Perpetual Lady Altas	8	1	.889	--
Letran Lady Knights	8	1	.889	--
San Sebastian Lady Stags	7	2	.778	1
Benilde Lady Blazers	7	2	.778	1
Arellano Lady Chiefs	5	4	.556	3
AUF Lady Danes	4	5	.444	4
**San Beda Red Lionesses**	3	6	.333	5
EAC Lady Generals	2	7	.222	6
Mapúa Lady Cardinals	1	8	.111	7
JRU Lady Bombers	0	9	.000	8

Season host is boldfaced. Guest teams are italicized.

==== Semifinals ====
Team	W	L	PCT	GB	Sets			Points		
Team	W	L	PCT	GB	Won	Lost	Ratio	Won	Lost	Ratio
San Sebastian Lady Stags	2	1	.667	--	7	3	2.333	227	197	1.152
Benilde Lady Blazers	2	1	.667	--	7	4	1.750	258	231	1.117
Perpetual Lady Altas	2	1	.667	--	6	4	1.500	227	208	1.091
Letran Lady Knights	0	3	.000	2	0	9	0.000	149	225	0.662

==== Finals ====
Date		Score		Set 1	Set 2	Set 3	Set 4	Set 5	Total
11 Oct	**San Sebastian Lady Stags**	**3–2**	Benilde Lady Blazers	20–25	25–21	22–25	25–19	16–14	**85–86**
15 Oct	San Sebastian Lady Stags	**1–3**	**Benilde Lady Blazers**	24–26	25–22	17–25	24–26		**90–99**
18 Oct	**San Sebastian Lady Stags**	**3–0**	Benilde Lady Blazers	25–23	26–24	25–15			**76–62**
San Sebastian wins series 2–1

=== Juniors' tournament ===
==== Elimination round ====
Team	W	L	PCT	GB	Sets Ratio
San Sebastian Staglets	7	0	1.000	--	10.500
Perpetual Junior Altas	6	1	.857	1	4.500
AUF Baby Danes	5	2	.714	2	2.429
La Salle Green Hills Greenies	3	4	.429	4	0.857
EAC–ICA Brigadiers	3	4	.429	4	0.833
Letran Squires	3	4	.429	4	0.533
**San Beda Red Cubs**	1	6	.143	6	0.250
Arellano Braves	0	7	.000	7	0.048

Season host is boldfaced. Guest teams are italicized.

==== Semifinals ====
Team	W	L	PCT	GB	Sets			Points		
Team	W	L	PCT	GB	Won	Lost	Ratio	Won	Lost	Ratio
Perpetual Junior Altas	3	0	1.000	--	9	3	3.000	280	199	1.407
San Sebastian Staglets	2	1	.667	1	7	4	1.750	239	239	1.000
AUF Baby Danes	1	2	.333	2	5	6	0.833	242	247	0.980
La Salle Green Hills Greenies	0	3	.000	3	1	9	0.111	172	248	0.694

==== Finals ====
Date		Score		Set 1	Set 2	Set 3	Set 4	Set 5	Total
11 Oct	**Perpetual Junior Altas**	**3–1**	San Sebastian Staglets	25–19	21–25	25–21	25–20		**96–85**
15 Oct	**Perpetual Junior Altas**	**3–1**	San Sebastian Staglets	23–25	25–12	25–23	25–17		**98–77**
UPHSD wins series 2–0

== Chess ==
Qualified to the semifinals with the twice-to-beat advantage
Qualified to the semifinals

The chess tournaments are held at SM City Manila starting on July 25, 2008.

=== Seniors' tournament ===
==== Elimination round ====
Team	W	D	L	Pts.	MP
Benilde Blazers	9	2	1	52½	20
Letran Knights	8	1	3	45	17
San Sebastian Stags	7	3	3	44	17
Mapúa Cardinals	6	3	3	39	15
EAC Generals	5	3	5	33½	13
**San Beda Red Lions**	4	3	6	29½	11
Perpetual Altas	6	1	5	28	13
JRU Heavy Bombers	3	0	9	15½	6
Arellano Chiefs	0	0	13	0	0

Season host is boldfaced. Guest teams are italicized.

==== Bracket ====
Games with asterisks (*) to be played if necessary.

Semifinals (Nos. 1 & 2 have twice-to-beat advantage)
1	**Benilde**	**2½**
4	Mapúa	1½
2	**Letran**	1	**3**
3	San Sebastian	**3**	1

Final (One-game playoff)
1	Benilde	2	2nd
2	**Letran**	**2**	**1st**

==== Awards ====
- Most Valuable Player: Chester Brian Guerrero (Letran)
- Coach of the Year: Roland Perez (Letran)

=== Juniors' tournament ===
==== Elimination round ====
Team	W	D	L	Pts.	MP
San Sebastian Staglets	10	3	0	44½	23
Letran Squires	10	2	0	40	22
La Salle Green Hills Greenies	8	3	1	36½	19
Perpetual Junior Altas	7	2	3	28½	16
**San Beda Red Cubs**	6	2	5	27	14
EAC–ICA Brigadiers	3	2	8	19½	8
Mapúa Red Robins	1	2	9	13½	4
JRU Light Bombers	1	2	9	10	4
Arellano Braves	1	0	12	4	2

Season host is boldfaced. Guest teams are italicized.

==== Bracket ====
Games with asterisks (*) to be played if necessary.

Semifinals (Nos. 1 & 2 have twice-to-beat advantage)
1	**San Sebastian**	**3**
4	Perpetual	1
2	**Letran**	**3½**
3	LSGH	½

Final (One-game playoff)
1	San Sebastian	**3**	**1st**
2	Letran	1	2nd

==== Awards ====
- Most Valuable Player: Aldous Roy Coronel (San Sebastian)
- Coach of the Year: Homer Cunanan (San Sebastian)

== Swimming ==
The swimming championships were held at Trace Aquatics Center Los Baños, Laguna starting from August 18. A women's tournament, a demonstration event, was also held. The results are:

=== Men's tournament ===
Team	Day 1	Day 2	Day 3	Total
San Beda Red Lions	459	524	436	1,419
Benilde Blazers	221	223	160.25	604.25
Mapúa Cardinals	101.5	138.5	82.5	322.5
San Sebastian Stags	88	51.82	66	205.82
AUF Great Danes	26	31.5	20.5	78
EAC Generals	24	19.5	19.25	62.75
Arellano Chiefs	12	24	13.5	49.5

- Most Valuable Swimmer: Theody Gavino (San Beda)
- Coach of the Year: Gavino Roxas (San Beda)

=== Juniors' tournament ===
Team	Day 1	Day 2	Day 3	Total
La Salle Green Hills Greenies	468	418.5	389	1,275.5
San Sebastian Staglets	204.5	160.5	160	525
Perpetual Junior Altas	158.5	215.5	91	465
San Beda Red Cubs	75.75	74.5	48	198.25
AUF Baby Danes	58.75	51.5	75	185.25
Mapúa Red Robins	50	95.5	20	165.5
EAC–ICA Brigadiers	29.5	17	0	46.5
Arellano Braves	18	11.5	9	38.5
JRU Light Bombers	1	0	0	1

- Most Valuable Swimmer: Luis Angelo Enriquez (LSGH)
- Coach of the Year: Gregory Colmenares (LSGH)

=== Women's tournament ===
Women's swimming is a demonstration sport and is not counted on the General Championship.

Team	Total
Benilde Lady Blazers	339
JRU Lady Bombers	164
EAC Lady Generals	156.5

== Football ==
The football tournaments are divided into three stages: A round robin elimination where the top four teams advance to the a round robin semifinals, and the finals where the top seed has the twice to beat advantage.

=== Seniors' tournament ===
==== Elimination round ====
Team	Pld	W	D	L	GF	GA	GD	Pts.
San Beda Red Lions	6	5	1	0	49	3	+46	16
Benilde Blazers	6	5	1	0	37	3	+34	16
Arellano Chiefs	6	4	0	2	27	8	+19	12
Mapúa Cardinals	6	2	1	3	24	8	+16	7
EAC Generals	6	2	1	3	14	10	+4	7
AUF Great Danes	6	1	0	5	3	66	−63	3
Perpetual Altas	6	0	0	6	1	57	−56	1

==== Semifinals ====
Team	Pld	W	D	L	GF	GA	GD	Pts.
Benilde Blazers	3	2	0	1	7	4	+3	6
San Beda Red Lions	3	2	0	1	6	4	+2	6
Mapúa Cardinals	3	2	0	1	6	5	+1	6
Arellano Chiefs	3	0	0	3	1	7	−6	0

==== Finals ====
February 17

Benilde Blazers	1–0	San Beda Red Lions

PhilSports Football Stadium, Pasig

=== Juniors' tournament ===
==== Elimination round ====
Team	Pld	W	D	L	GF	GA	GD	Pts.
La Salle Green Hills Greenies	7	7	0	0	93	1	+92	21
Perpetual Junior Altas	7	5	1	1	69	7	+62	16
San Beda Red Cubs	7	5	1	1	37	10	+27	16
Mapúa Red Robins	7	2	2	3	14	23	−9	8
EAC–ICA Brigadiers	7	2	1	4	18	27	−9	7
Arellano Braves	7	2	3	3	12	32	−20	7
Letran Squires	7	0	2	5	4	71	−71	2
AUF Baby Danes	7	0	1	6	2	74	−74	1

==== Semifinals ====
Team	Pld	W	D	L	GF	GA	GD	Pts.
La Salle Green Hills Greenies	3	3	0	0	15	4	+11	9
San Beda Red Cubs	3	2	0	1	6	4	+2	6
Perpetual Junior Altas	3	1	0	2	6	5	+1	3
Mapúa Red Robins	3	0	0	3	0	14	−14	0

==== Finals ====
February 17

La Salle Green Hills Greenies	3–0	San Beda Red Cubs

PhilSports Football Stadium, Pasig

== Cheerleading ==
The NCAA Cheerdance Competition was held on October 21, 2009, at the Filoil Flying V Arena. The affair was covered live by Studio 23 and was hosted by Drei Felix and the various NCAA courtside reporters.

Squad	Score
UPHSD PerpSquad	335.5
JRU Pep Squad	311
EAC Pep Squad	244
San Sebastian Pep Squad	243
Mapua Cheerping Cardinals	236.5
AUF Pep Squad	214
CSB Pep Squad	194.5
Arellano Pep Squad	169
Letran Cheering Squad	168.5
San Beda Cheerleading Association	148

=== Awards ===
NCAA Season 85 cheerleading champions
Perpetual Altas
Fourth title

== General Championship race ==
Season host is boldfaced.

=== Juniors' Division ===
Rank	Team	Total
1	San Sebastian Staglets	295
2	La Salle Green Hills Greenies	280
3	Perpetual Junior Altas	233
4	**San Beda Red Cubs**	223
5	Letran Squires	197
6	EAC–ICA Brigadiers	93
7	Mapúa Red Robins	78
8	JRU Light Bombers	64
9	Arellano Braves	60
10	AUF Baby Danes	57

=== Seniors' Division ===
Rank	Team	Total
1	Letran Knights	325
2	Benilde Blazers	321.60
3	San Sebastian Stags	306
4	**San Beda Red Lions**	289
5	Perpetual Altas	213
6	Arellano Chiefs	156
7	Mapúa Cardinals	153.60
8	JRU Heavy Bombers	129
9	EAC Generals	90.60
10	AUF Great Danes	82

== See also ==
- UAAP Season 72
