= NCAA basketball championships (Philippines) =

Philippines college basketball tournaments

- Sport: Basketball
- Founded: 1924
- No. of teams: 10
- Country: Philippines
- Most recent champions: San Beda Red Lions (Men); Letran Squires (Juniors)
- Most titles: San Beda (46, overall); San Beda Red Lions (23, men); San Beda Red Cubs (23, juniors)
- Broadcaster: Cignal TV

The NCAA basketball championships are the basketball championships of the National Collegiate Athletic Association (Philippines) (NCAA). There are two tournaments, usually held concurrently, the seniors' tournament for male collegiate students, and the juniors' tournament for male senior high school students. If a school wins both championships in one season, it said that they have won the "double championship."

The championship is continually contested since the NCAA's foundation in 1924, except during World War II, during the mid-1960s when scandals rocked the association, in 1980 when the tournament was aborted by the Basketball Association of the Philippines, and from 2020 to 2021 during the COVID-19 pandemic.

Prior to NCAA Season 98 (2022), the juniors' tournament was held concurrently with the men's tournament, in the first semester or from June to November. Due to the effects of the COVID-19 pandemic, NCAA Season 97 meant to be played in 2021 was postponed to early 2022, and the juniors' tournament was cancelled. The men's tournament of NCAA Season 98 was then played from September to December, then the juniors' tournament from January to March. The NCAA then kept this schedule for all succeeding seasons until NCAA Season 101 (2025), where they reverted back to both men's and juniors' tournament being held concurrently.

The athletic nicknames of the different teams variously came from the school's founders, or from a distinct quality that separated a school from the others.

== Tournament formats ==
Every tournament host school proposes its own tournament format every season. From the end of World War II until 1997, and since 1997, the tournament format has been stable, save for things such as one game playoffs when there are tied teams; in same cases, elimination round results determined the tiebreaker, but on other tournaments playoffs were used.

=== Historical formats ===
==== Two round format ====
In its early years, the NCAA had all of its teams divided into groups, where each team plays the team from its group once, then the top teams from each group play in the championship round, where the top ranked team is named the champion.

==== Split season format ====
Prior to 1997, when the NCAA had, for most part of its history, six teams, it employed a split season format. The winner of the first round (the team with the highest standing) would notch the first Final berth, while the winner of the second round would notch the second Final berth.

In some years, if a team manages to have the best overall record, yet fails to win either round, that team will play the winner of the second round in a playoff game, to face the winner of the first round in the Championship game. The games of the Championship round are all single-elimination matches, until the 1980s when the Championship game was expanded to a best-of-three series.

If a team manages to win both rounds (not necessarily a sweep), the Championship round will be omitted, and that team will be declared outright champions.

In cases of tie, a playoff game may be played to determine which team won the round. If more than two teams are tied, each team will play the teams they are tied with once. If for example, a team won the first round, and is tied with another team for first place at the second round, a playoff game will be played to determine which team wins the round. If the team that won the first round wins in the playoff game, the Championship round will be omitted, since the team won both rounds. If the other team wins, a Championship round will held, since two different teams won the two rounds.

==== Play-in tournament ====
The 2021 tournament, held in early 2022, was in a special format used only for that season. There was only one round of eliminations, and a play-in tournament was held for teams that finished third to sixth; after that, the regular Final Four format was used.

=== Final Four format ===
From 1997 to 2024, all member schools have fielded their varsity teams in a double round elimination tournament, where the schools play each other twice. The four teams with the best records advance to the crossover semifinals, popularly known as the Final Four.

The two top teams have a twice-to-beat advantage. The lower ranked teams need to win twice against the higher ranked teams to advance to the best-of-three finals, where the first team to reach two wins becomes the NCAA basketball champion.

In cases of tie, the NCAA has had one game playoffs on some seasons, while none on others.

==== Elimination round sweep ====
If any event a team finishes the elimination round undefeated, that team will advance outright to the finals. The third and fourth seeds will have a sudden-death game to determine the opponent of the second seed. Then, the winner of the sudden-death match between the second seed and third/fourth seed advances to the finals to face the first seed.

Previously, the first seed holds a twice to beat advantage in the finals (the finals would not be a best of three affair), until 2008, the finals was in a best-of-three series even if a team swept the elimination round.

Since 2010 the team who sweeps the elimination round will automatically go to the finals with a thrice-to-beat advantage and a 1-0 edge over their opponent, their opponent needs to beat them thrice while the team who sweeps the 2-round elimination will just have to beat their opponents twice.

=== Current format ===
In 2025, the NCAA announced a modification of the overall format of both the men's and juniors' tournaments in response of Metro Manila hosting the 2025 FIVB Men's Volleyball World Championship, which caused the NCAA to delay the opening in October than the usual September due to venue availability.

The current format revealed that all teams will be divided into two groups of five teams, with each team playing the teams on its group twice, then teams on the other group once, for a total of 13 games each. The top three teams in both groups will advance to quarterfinals, while the top two teams clinches twice-to-beat advantage. The two-lowest ranked teams per group, on the other hand, faces off in a play-in game to determine the final two slots in the quarterfinals.

In the quarterfinals, the No. 1 team in each group will face the No. 4 team from the opposite group, while the No. 2 team in each group will face the No. 3 team from the opposite group. Four teams then advances to the semifinals and two teams advances to the finals, while the semifinal losers battle it out for third place. Both the semifinals and finals round are best-of-three series.

Currently, the current format is in a three-year trial period that will be used until Season 103 (2027–28) to evaluate its long-term viability and will be determined if it will become a permanent fixture.

== History ==
- 1924: The NCAA began its first season. In basketball, the Ateneo de Manila won the Midgets title, De La Salle College won the Juniors title, and the University of the Philippines won the seniors title.
- 1927: San Beda won their first Seniors title in the NCAA's fourth season.
- 1928: Letran joined the NCAA. On the same year the Squires won their first juniors championship and then went on winning two more, thus establishing NCAA's first three consecutive juniors championships.
- 1936: UP and UST withdrew permanently from the NCAA. FEU also withdrew.
- 1939: A pair of Ateneo-De La Salle Final games were held at the Rizal Memorial Coliseum. The juniors De La Salle team defeated the Ateneo juniors team, while later on the day the De La Salle seniors team defeated the Ateneo seniors team. The De La Salle seniors team captured their first NCAA Basketball title.
- 1941: Ateneo de Manila and Jose Rizal College won the last basketball championships before the start of World War II.
- 1947: The Championship Game went into the last shot, which led to De La Salle winning the first basketball championship after the Pacific War, against Mapua.
- 1950: At the final game of the elimination round, the Letran Knights were assured of a title, for they've won the two rounds, but the San Beda Red Lions beat them on the final non-bearing game, depriving them of a season sweep.
- 1955: San Beda won the three-legged Crispulo Zamora Cup defeating Ateneo de Manila.
- 1962: At the Final game, a riot ensued when Mapua supporters alleged that a referee favored the Ateneo team. The Eagles won the game, and the championship.
- 1967: De La Salle chose the up-and-coming La Salle Green Hills as their new Juniors' counterpart after the original De La Salle High School was phased out.
- 1972: The JRC Heavy Bombers won their last (as of 2023) NCAA title, with all of the team's starting five being drafted to the newly formed Philippine Basketball Association three years later.
- 1973: The SSC-R Golden Stags, led by David Supnet, won their first ever NCAA Seniors Basketball crown.
- 1974: First round pennant winners De La Salle defeated second round pennant winners Ateneo 90-80 to win the NCAA championship. Lim Eng Beng, who held the all-time points per game average (32 ppg) breaks NCAA record of most points scored in a game (55 pts).
- 1977: In the 1977 finals series, Ateneo de Manila and San Beda had their melee at the Araneta Coliseum. This led to a closed-door match, wherein Ateneo de Manila's Pons Valdez's last shot was disallowed as time expired, giving San Beda the victory.
- 1978: Association-wide violence led to the withdrawal of Ateneo de Manila from the NCAA. At the time Ateneo de Manila left, it had the most titles in men's basketball, a record that would only be tied and surpassed in 2003. San Beda withdrew in 1982 but came back in 1986.
- 1979: Letran was declared as the winner by beating Mapua Cardinals with the score of 63-62 in the second round of the tournament and the fact that they were also the champion in the first round tournament. The team was so strong that no one was able to match their firepower as the team was so strong in all the departments and it took the Knights four years in the making before becoming the champion of the association. The team's lineup was headed by Ramon San Juan (G-F), Ted McKinney (C), Itoy Esguerra (F), Bong Aninon (F), Nonie Robles (G-F), Tim Coloso (G) Eddie Baldomero (G), Bobby Valenzuela (C), Tony DeLeon (C), Mon Navales (G), William Alberto (G) and Boyet Olano (G). Ramon San Juan was voted Most Valuable Player of the tournament.

Some of the Letran team players were products of their Varsity High School Team namely: Ted McKinney, Ramon San Juan, William Alberto and were also part of the 1976 National Inter-Secondary Champion Team that was held in Baguio City wherein they beat their NCAA rival San Beda College with the score of 52-51.

During the 1979–80 NCAA season, Colegio de San Juan de Letran achieved a double championship by winning both the Juniors and Seniors divisions of the NCAA Basketball Championship. The Muralla-based Knights were also declared General Champions by the NCAA Management after accumulating the highest overall points across all sanctioned sports competitions that season. The achievement marked the first time Letran secured the General Championship while capturing both basketball titles in the same year.

- 1980: De La Salle fans and Letran supporters engaged themselves in a brawl during the second round of eliminations in the 1980 season. The Rizal Memorial Coliseum was wrecked apart as the two sides ripped apart the chairs bolted to the ground and threw them as weapons. The Basketball Association of the Philippines aborted the 1980 season and suspended Letran from all events. In 1981, the association readmitted Letran, which led to De La Salle withdrawing from the NCAA. De La Salle went to the UAAP, but was denied membership on their first try (with a vote of 5-2, with Ateneo de Manila and UST voting against). De La Salle was finally admitted to the UAAP in 1986 but was required to drop LSGH as their Juniors' counterpart. De La Salle chose De La Salle-Zobel as their new high school team.
- 1982: Avelino Lim led the Knights to two pennants, scrapping the championship round, with their only loss coming from the San Sebastian Golden Stags. This would be the start of a three-year championship streak of Letran.
- 1985: The SSC-R Golden Stags won their second NCAA Seniors Basketball crown and their first in twelve years. They also ended Letran's championship streak at 3. Alvin Patrimonio of the Mapua Cardinals won the season MVP plum.
- 1988: The SSC-R Golden Stags became the first team in NCAA history to sweep the Seniors Basketball tournament. They won the first and second round pennants and ended up as eventual champions with a 10-0 record. 1987 NCAA MVP Eugene Quilban won his back-to-back MVP award. Paul Alvarez played in his last NCAA season and ended up as a champion.
- 1989: Only in their fifth year in the association, the Perpetual Help Altas, led by season MVP Eric Clement Quiday and Rene "Bong" Hawkins barged into the NCAA finals. However, they were beaten by the defending champions, the SSC-R Golden Stags, in the three-game series. The Stags' Eugene Quilban, who played in his last season, was named as the best player of the series-clinching game.
- 1990: Albert “Kevin” Ramas was a key factor in helping the Mapua Cardinals win the NCAA championship in 1990. He would graduate after winning the championship.[2]
- 1991: Benito Cheng of Mapua scored on the last second of the deciding Game 3 to deny San Beda the championship at the ULTRA. The Cardinals snapped their "once in sixteen years" championship curse as the Red Lions extended their title drought to 13 years. MVP Antonio Valeriano of the Lions was a non-factor in the championship round.
- 1993: Season MVP Jesse Bardaje and rookie Ulysses Tanigue led the SSC-R Golden Stags to the first of five straight NCAA Seniors Basketball crowns. Led by Tanigue's 27 points, the Stags clinched the championship during their ninth game of the season via a 110-76 rout over the Letran Knights for an 8-1 record. With the win, the team copped the second round pennant and the automatic championship for the season. The newly crowned champion Stags finished with an overall record of 8-2 after losing their non-bearing last game to the Mapua Cardinals. Coach Arturo "Turo" Valenzona won his first championship in the NCAA.
- 1994: The SSC-R Golden Stags achieved the second clean sweep in NCAA Seniors' Basketball history and automatically won the championship. The team finished with a 10-0 record. Stags John Rodney Santos and Romel Adducul received the season MVP and Rookie of the Year awards, respectively.
- 1995: The SSC-R Golden Stags made their first ever three-peat championship and became the fifth team to do so in NCAA Seniors Basketball history. The Stags raced to a 9-0 start for a 19-game winning streak dating back to the previous season before losing their last regular season game against the MVP Ruben Dela Rosa led-Mapua Cardinals, the second round pennant winner they eventually swept in the best-of-three finals to end up with an 11-1 card.
- 1996: The SSC-R Golden Stags became the first team in NCAA history to win four straight Seniors Basketball crowns. They swept the second round pennant winner SBC Red Lions in the best-of-three finals to end up with an overall record of 12-2. Romel Adducul was named as the NCAA MVP. SSC-R also celebrated its 50th (Golden) anniversary as an academic institution.
- 1997: San Sebastian College-Recoletos, which was led by the Sensational Six in back-to-back MVP Romel Adducul, Aramis Calpito, Jasper Ocampo, Ulysses Tanigue, Brixter Encarnacion, and team captain Rommel Daep, made a 12-0 seniors regular season sweep. All six players won their fourth championship individually, with Adducul, Calpito, and Ocampo winning four straight dating back to 1994. The Golden Stags faced San Beda in the finals with a twice-to-beat advantage and prevailed, 84-72, after leading by just four at halftime. They capped off a five-year run as NCAA champions by way of another clean sweep, the third in NCAA Seniors Basketball history, with an overall record of 13-0. The Stags also averaged 89.5 points per game during the season while limiting their opponents to 69.16 points per contest. Reserves Jerome Barbosa, Michael "Topex" Robinson, Alvin Pua, and rookie Mark Macapagal were also part of the legendary 1997 San Sebastian team, arguably the best and most dominating team in NCAA history. Rookie coach Arturo "Bay" Cristobal piloted the team. The Stags' Sensational Six left after the 1997 season, leaving behind a young squad which will be eventually led in 1998 by Barbosa, Robinson, Macapagal, Pua, and rookies Homer Se and Christian Coronel, the 1998 Rookie of the Year.
- 1998: De La Salle-College of Saint Benilde is admitted to the NCAA while La Salle Green Hills returns to the association after a 17-year absence. The Letran Knights, led by rookie coach Luis Francisco "Louie" Alas, NCAA "oldie" Christian Calaguio (1998 NCAA MVP) and promising sophomore Kerby Raymundo (1997 Rookie of the Year), capitalized on the departure of the Sensational Six and won the NCAA Seniors Basketball crown.
- 1999: The Letran Knights became the first fourth-seeded team to upset the top seed in the NCAA Final Four when they defeated the SSC-R Golden Stags twice. That feat was soon duplicated by the Golden Stags the following season when they beat the JRC Heavy Bombers twice to enter the 2000 NCAA finals. The Knights also won the 1999 NCAA Seniors Basketball crown against the Heavy Bombers in a fight-marred championship series. That was their 14th NCAA Seniors Basketball title and it tied them with the Ateneo de Manila Blue Eagles for the most NCAA Seniors Basketball crowns. They were led by 1999 NCAA MVP Kerby Raymundo, Allan Salangsang, John Paul Prior, William "Billy" Moody, Orlann Tama, and rookie coach Vincent "Binky" Favis.
- 2000: College of Saint of Benilde won their first NCAA seniors title despite joining the association only two seasons ago. This marks the fastest win for any new school in the association since the World War. In the Juniors finals, the Letran Squires qualified outright for the finals with a 14-0 record. However, they were beaten twice by the Mapua Red Robins in the finals. This was the last Juniors championship of the Mapua Institute of Technology prior to phasing out the old Mapua High School.
- 2003: The Letran Knights became the most-titled team in NCAA seniors basketball history after clinching their 15th crown. They defeated the defending champions SSC-R Golden Stags in the finals. Ronjay Enrile was named as the 2003 NCAA Finals MVP.
- 2004: The NCAA Seniors finals featured two schools that have never won a championship before, Philippine Christian University and the newly renamed University of Perpetual Help Dalta System. The PCU Dolphins won the series in two games, with Gabriel Espinas becoming the first-ever Most Valuable Player and Rookie of the Year within the same season.
- 2006: San Beda finally broke their 28-year championship drought as they edged out three-time finalist PCU Dolphins in the final game that went down to the wire. Rookie MVP Samuel Ekwe and Finals MVP Yousif Aljamal led the Red Lions, which became the 3rd most-titled team in NCAA Seniors Basketball history with 12 crowns.
- 2009: The SSC-R Golden Stags broke San Beda's three-year championship run with a 2–0 sweep in their finals series. The Stags won their first 15 games, an association seniors' basketball record, and ended their 7-year title drought. They also won a total of 19 games, an all-time season record in the association. San Sebastian's last finals appearance was in 2003, losing to Letran in 3 games.
- 2010: San Beda made a 16-0 sweep in the elimination round. They also swept the finals which makes their record a historic 18-0.
- 2011: San Sebastian stopped San Beda's 26-game winning streak since 2010 by beating them on their 1st round meeting but San Beda got their revenge on the 2nd round over San Sebastian and forced a playoff for number 1 seed which San Beda won. For the sixth year in a row San Beda ended the elimination round as the number one team and went on to the finals. San Beda then went on to win their 2nd championship in a row by sweeping San Sebastian in the finals once again.
- 2012: San Beda became the most-titled team in the association, with 17 championships, by beating Letran in the finals. This was their sixth championship in seven years and their seventh consecutive finals appearance.
- 2013: San Beda became the school with the most double championships with 5 after the Red Cubs and the Red Lions won the championship in both the juniors and seniors divisions against their respective opponents. Since the Red Cubs and the Red Lions had been the reigning juniors and seniors champions since 2010, San Beda thus became the first school to achieve a 4th-straight double championship.
- 2014: San Beda Red Lions won their 19th seniors basketball championship and become only the second team to win 5 consecutive championships after San Sebastian did the trick from 1993–1997. This was their eighth championship in the last nine years and their ninth consecutive finals appearance. Likewise, the San Beda Red Cubs won their 21st juniors basketball championship and became the first team in NCAA history to win six straight championships.
- 2015: Letran ended San Beda Red Lions' five-year title reign. The Knights won their 17th seniors basketball championship after a 10-year drought. The Red Lions appeared in the finals for a record 10th time but lost their second. Meanwhile, the San Beda Red Cubs won their 22nd juniors basketball championship and this time, became the first team in NCAA history to win seven straight championships.
- 2016: San Beda Red Lions won their 20th seniors basketball championship. This was their ninth championship in the last eleven years and their eleventh consecutive finals appearance. San Beda became the first host school, since 2005, to win the title. In the juniors tournament, the Malayan Red Robins ended San Beda Red Cubs' seven-year championship run. This is the Malayan Red Robins' first juniors basketball championship, since the old Mapua High School has phased out in 2000.
- 2017: San Beda won their 21st seniors basketball championship by defeating the season leaders and first-time finals contenders, Lyceum Pirates. This was their tenth championship in twelve years and their twelfth consecutive finals appearance. In the juniors tournament, the LSGH Greenies dethroned the Malayan Red Robins to win their first championship in NCAA history.
- 2019: Letran Knights dethroned San Beda again after 4 years, ending their three-year championship streak. The Knights won their 18th seniors basketball championship. In the juniors tournament, the San Beda Red Cubs won their 23rd juniors basketball championship by defeating the Lyceum Junior Pirates.
- 2022: Letran won their 20th seniors basketball championship, made their second three-peat for the first time since Samboy Lim lead the team in his era from 1982 to 1984. Defeating the College of Saint Benilde Blazers, which entered finals for the first time since their last finals appearance in 2002, losing to the San Sebastian Stags. Also in juniors, the Letran Squires also won their 13th championship by defeating the La Salle Green Hills Greenies. Marking the end of the 22-year title drought, and the first double championship of the school in both seniors and juniors since 1983.

== NCAA basketball champions ==
Basketball, as the most popular sport in the Philippines, receives the most attention from the press and the sports-minded public. As a result, the NCAA Seniors Basketball championship is the most coveted title among the NCAA events.

San Beda has the most Seniors basketball title a record 22 times, followed by Colegio de San Juan de Letran with 20 and the Ateneo de Manila (now with the University Athletic Association of the Philippines) is third with 14.

There is a separate division for high school student-athletes, the Juniors division. San Beda High School has the most titles with 23 while the Malayan High School of Science (formerly Mapúa High School) won 22.

San Beda University leads the overall tally with 45 basketball titles, followed by Letran with 33. Among defunct members, Ateneo has the most championships, with 23.

The current champions are the Mapúa Cardinals (seniors), and the Perpetual Junior Altas (juniors).

=== Double Championships ===
When a school wins both the Juniors (or Midgets pre-1925) and Seniors tournament at the same season, the school is said to have won the double championship.

As of 2023, only seven schools were able to win the double championship:

- 1925–26: University of the Philippines
- 1926–27: University of the Philippines
- 1931–32: Ateneo de Manila (juniors' title was shared)
- 1932–33: Ateneo de Manila
- 1933–34: Ateneo de Manila
- 1937–38: Ateneo de Manila
- 1939–40: De La Salle College
- 1965–66: Mapúa Institute of Technology
- 1975–76: Ateneo de Manila University
- 1976–77: Ateneo de Manila University
- 1978–79: San Beda College
- 1979–80: Colegio de San Juan de Letran
- 1983–84: Colegio de San Juan de Letran
- 1988-89: San Sebastian College-Recoletos
- 1989-90: San Sebastian College-Recoletos
- 1993-94: San Sebastian College-Recoletos
- 1994-95: San Sebastian College-Recoletos
- 1995-96: San Sebastian College-Recoletos
- 1997-98: San Sebastian College-Recoletos
- 2001-02: San Sebastian College-Recoletos
- 2002-03: San Sebastian College-Recoletos
- 2009-10: San Sebastian College-Recoletos
- 2010–11: San Beda College
- 2011–12: San Beda College
- 2012–13: San Beda College
- 2013–14: San Beda College
- 2014–15: San Beda College
- 2022–23: Colegio de San Juan de Letran

Ateneo de Manila University, San Beda College and San Sebastian College-Recoletos have the most double championships with six apiece. San Beda College also has the most consecutive double championships with five.

== Awards ==
Players of all nationalities were eligible for all awards, until NCAA Season 95 (2019), where a separate category was made for foreigners. From NCAA Season 96 (2020) onwards, rosters were restricted to Filipinos.

=== Most Valuable Player ===
==== Men's tournament ====
Season	Name	Nationality	Team
1936	Charles Borck	Philippines	San Beda
1940	Arturo Rius	Philippines	San Beda
1948	Moro Lorenzo	Philippines	Ateneo
1949	Moro Lorenzo	Philippines	Ateneo
1950	Lauro Mumar	Philippines	Letran
1951	Carlos Loyzaga	Philippines	San Beda
1952	Carlos Loyzaga	Philippines	San Beda
1953	Francisco Rabat	Philippines	Ateneo
1959	Alberto Reynoso	Philippines	San Beda
1961	Amado Martelino	Philippines	Ateneo
1966	Jimmy Alabanza	Philippines	Ateneo
1967	Rhoel Deles	Philippines	JRC
1969	Sixto Agbay	Philippines	JRC
1971	Atoy Co	Philippines	Mapúa
1972	Philip Cezar	Philippines	JRC
1973	Freddie Hubalde	Philippines	Mapúa
1974	Lim Eng Beng	Philippines	La Salle
1975	Alex Marquez	Philippines	Letran
1976	Steve Watson	Philippines	Ateneo
1977	Bernardo Carpio	Philippines	Ateneo
1978	Alex Marquez	Philippines	La Salle
1979	Ramon San Juan	Philippines	Letran
1981	Leo Isaac	Philippines	Mapúa
1982	Jerry Gonzales	Philippines	Letran
1983	Romeo Ang	Philippines	Letran
1984	Samboy Lim	Philippines	Letran
1985	Alvin Patrimonio	Philippines	Mapúa
1986	Alvin Patrimonio	Philippines	Mapúa
1987	Eugene Quilban	Philippines	San Sebastian
1988	Eugene Quilban	Philippines	San Sebastian
1989	Eric Clement Quiday	Philippines	Perpetual
1990	Estelito Epondulan	Philippines	JRU
1991	Antonio Valeriano	Philippines	San Beda
1992	Ronald Peña	Philippines	Letran
1993	Jesse Bardaje	Philippines	San Sebastian
1994	Rodney Santos	Philippines	San Sebastian
1995	Ruben dela Rosa	Philippines	Mapúa
1996	Rommel Adducul	Philippines	San Sebastian
1997	Rommel Adducul	Philippines	San Sebastian
1998	Chris Calaguio	Philippines	Letran
1999	Kerby Raymundo	Philippines	Letran
2000	Jojo Manalo	Philippines	Perpetual
2001	Nani Epondulan	Philippines	JRU
2002	Sunday Salvacion	Philippines	Benilde
2003	Leo Najorda	Philippines	San Sebastian
2004	Gabby Espinas	Philippines	PCU
2005	Jay Sagad	Philippines	Benilde
2006	Sam Ekwe	Nigeria	San Beda
2007	Kelvin dela Peña	Philippines	Mapúa
2008	Sam Ekwe	Nigeria	San Beda
2009	John Wilson	Philippines	JRU
2010	Sudan Daniel	United States	San Beda
2011	Calvin Abueva	Philippines	San Sebastian
2012	Ian Sangalang	Philippines	San Sebastian
2013	Raymond Almazan	Philippines	Letran
2014	Scottie Thompson	Philippines	Perpetual
2015	Allwell Oraeme	Nigeria	Mapúa
2016	Allwell Oraeme	Nigeria	Mapúa
2017	CJ Perez	Philippines	Lyceum
2018	Prince Eze	Nigeria	Perpetual
2019	Calvin Oftana	Philippines	San Beda
2020 (Note: Season cancelled due to the COVID-19 pandemic.)	No tournament		
2021 (Note: Season postponed to early 2022 due to the COVID-19 pandemic.)	Rhenz Abando	Philippines	Letran
2022	Will Gozum	Philippines	Benilde
2023	Clint Escamis	Philippines	Mapúa
2024	Allen Liwag	Philippines	Benilde
2025	Allen Liwag	Philippines	Benilde

==== Juniors' tournament ====
Season	Name	Nationality	Team
1991	Tyrone Bautista	Philippines	San Beda
1992	Mark Telan	Philippines	Mapúa
1993	Dondon Valerio	Philippines	Mapúa
1994	Gherome Ejercito	Philippines	Mapúa
1995	Marvin Ortiguerra	Philippines	Mapúa
1996	Ren-Ren Ritualo (Note: Co-winners)	Philippines	San Beda
1996	Jenkins Mesina	Philippines	San Beda
1997	Edsel Feliciano	Philippines	Mapúa
1998	Derrick Hubalde	Philippines	Mapúa
1999	Arjun Cordero	Philippines	San Beda
2000	Ronjay Enrile	Philippines	Letran
2001	Jay-R Reyes	Philippines	Letran
2002	Oliver Cua	Philippines	Letran
2003	Jay-R Taganas	Philippines	San Beda
2004	Ogie Menor	Philippines	San Beda
2005	Allan Mangahas	Philippines	PCU
2006	Jake Pascual	Philippines	PCU
2007	Ryan Buenafe	Philippines	San Sebastian
2008	Keith Agovida	Philippines	JRU
2009	Louie Vigil	Philippines	JRU
2010	Baser Amer	Philippines	San Beda
2011	Rey Nambatac	Philippines	Letran
2012	Bong Quinto	Philippines	Letran
2013	Prince Rivero	Philippines	LSGH
2014	Darius Estrella	Philippines	JRU
2015	Michael Enriquez	Philippines	Malayan
2016	Troy Mallillin	Philippines	LSGH
2017	Will Gozum	Philippines	Malayan
2018	JD Cagulangan	Philippines	LSGH
2019	John Barba	Philippines	Lyceum
2020	No tournament		
2021	No tournament		
2023	Luis Pablo	Philippines	LSGH
2024	Amiel Acido	Philippines	Perpetual
2025 (S100)	Lebron Jhames Daep	Philippines	Perpetual
2025 (S101)	Sean Franco	Philippines	Arellano

=== Finals Most Valuable Player ===
Was originally named "Most Outstanding Player" in the 1990s.

==== Men's tournament ====
Season	Name	Nationality	Team
1992	Gilbert Castillo	Philippines	Letran
1999	Kerby Raymundo	Philippines	Letran
2000	Mark Magsumbol	Philippines	Benilde
2001	Christian Coronel	Philippines	San Sebastian
2002	Leo Najorda	Philippines	San Sebastian
2003	Ronjay Enrile	Philippines	Letran
2004	Robert Sanz	Philippines	PCU
2005	Boyet Bautista	Philippines	Letran
2006	Yousif Aljamal	Philippines	San Beda
2007	Ogie Menor	Philippines	San Beda
2008	Sam Ekwe	Nigeria	San Beda
2009	Jimbo Aquino	Philippines	San Sebastian
2010	Sudan Daniel	United States	San Beda
2011	Dave Marcelo	Philippines	San Beda
2012	Baser Amer	Philippines	San Beda
2013	Arthur dela Cruz	Philippines	San Beda
2014	Anthony Semerad	Philippines	San Beda
2015	Mark Cruz	Philippines	Letran
2016	Arnaud Noah	Cameroon	San Beda
2017	Donald Tankoua	Cameroon	San Beda
2018	Javee Mocon	Philippines	San Beda
2019	Fran Yu	Philippines	Letran
2020	No tournament		
2021	Jeo Ambohot	Philippines	Letran
2022	King Caralipio	Philippines	Letran
2023	James Payosing	Philippines	San Beda
2024	Clint Escamis	Philippines	Mapúa
2025	Bryan Sajonia	Philippines	San Beda

==== Juniors' tournament ====
Season	Name	Nationality	Team
2001	Chuck Ronquillo	Philippines	Letran
2002	JVee Casio	Philippines	San Beda
2003	Ogie Menor	Philippines	San Beda
2004	Ogie Menor	Philippines	San Beda
2005	Eric Salamat	Philippines	San Sebastian
2006	Ryan Buenafe	Philippines	San Sebastian
2007	Ryan Buenafe	Philippines	San Sebastian
2008	Arvie Bringas	Philippines	San Sebastian
2009	Baser Amer	Philippines	San Beda
2010	Baser Amer	Philippines	San Beda
2011	Francis Abarcar	Philippines	San Beda
2012	Javee Mocon	Philippines	San Beda
2013	Arvin Tolentino	Philippines	San Beda
2014	Andrei Caracut	Philippines	San Beda
2015	Evan Nelle	Philippines	San Beda
2016	Bryan Samudio	Philippines	Malayan
2017	JD Cagulangan	Philippines	LSGH
2018	Paolo Hernandez	Philippines	Malayan
2019	Rhayyan Amsali	Philippines	San Beda
2020	No tournament		
2021	No tournament		
2023	Andy Gemao	Philippines	Letran
2024	Jonathan Manalili	Philippines	Letran
2025 (S100)	Lebron Jhames Daep	Philippines	Perpetual
2025 (S101)	Justin Cargo	Philippines	Letran

=== Rookie of the Year ===
==== Men's tournament ====
Season	Name	Nationality	Team
1994	Rommel Adducul	Philippines	San Sebastian
1995	Jerome Barbosa	Philippines	San Sebastian
1996	Willie Miller	Philippines	Letran
1997	Kerby Raymundo	Philippines	Letran
1998	Christian Coronel	Philippines	San Sebastian
1999	Sunday Salvacion	Philippines	Benilde
2000	Al Magpayo	Philippines	Benilde
2001	Ismael Junio	Philippines	Letran
2002	Julian Bermejo	Philippines	San Sebastian
2003	Ronnie Bughao	Philippines	San Beda
2004	Gabby Espinas	Philippines	PCU
2005	Kelvin dela Peña	Philippines	Mapúa
2006	Sam Ekwe	Nigeria	San Beda
2007	Dave Marcelo	Philippines	San Beda
2008	Allan Mangahas	Philippines	Mapúa
2009	Sudan Daniel	United States	San Beda
2010	Carlo Lastimosa	Philippines	Benilde
2011	Josan Nimes	Philippines	Mapúa
2012	Cedric Noube Happi	Cameroon	EAC
2013	Juneric Baloria	Philippines	Perpetual
2014	Dioncee Holts	United States	Arellano
2015	Alwell Oraeme	Nigeria	Mapúa
2016	Mike Harry Nzeusseu	Cameroon	Lyceum
2017	Jaycee Marcelino	Philippines	Lyceum
2018	Larry Muyang	Philippines	Letran
2019	Justin Arana	Philippines	Arellano
2020	No tournament		
2021	Rhenz Abando	Philippines	Letran
2022	Cade Flores	Philippines	Arellano
2023	Clint Escamis	Philippines	Mapúa
2024	Chris Hubilla	Philippines	Mapúa
2025	Jonathan Manalili	Philippines	Letran

==== Juniors' tournament ====
Season	Name	Nationality	Team
2001	Jay-R Reyes	Philippines	Letran
2002	PJ Walsham	Philippines	Letran
2003	Jay-R Taganas	Philippines	San Beda
2004	Marko Batricevic	Serbia	LSGH
2005	Darell Green	Philippines	Letran
2006	Jake Pascual	Philippines	PCU
2007	Keith Agovida	Philippines	JRU
2008	Jarelan Tampus	Philippines	Letran
2009	Baser Amer	Philippines	San Beda
2010	Rey Nambatac	Philippines	Letran
2011	Lugie Cuyas	Philippines	EAC
2012	Bong Quinto	Philippines	Letran
2013	Jeric Adorio	Philippines	JRU
2014	Raphael Chavez	Philippines	Perpetual
2015	Lars Sunga	Philippines	Arellano
2016	Aaron Fermin	Philippines	Arellano
2017	Inand Fornilos	Philippines	LSGH
2018	Jonnel Policarpio	Philippines	Malayan
2019	Jolo Manansala	Philippines	LSGH
2020	No tournament		
2021	No tournament		
2023	Matthew Rubico	Philippines	Lyceum
2024	Mark Gojo Cruz	Philippines	Perpetual
2025 (S100)	Allan Laurenaria	Philippines	Malayan
2025 (S101)	Josef Calo-oy	Philippines	LSGH

=== Freshman of the Year ===
This award has only been awarded in the men's tournament.

Season	Name	Nationality	Team
2023	Jay Garupil	Philippines	Letran
2024	Chris Hubilla	Philippines	Mapúa
2025	Jonathan Manalili	Philippines	Letran

=== Defensive Player of the Year ===
==== Men's tournament ====
Season	Name	Nationality	Team
2005	Gabby Espinas	Philippines	PCU
2006	Samuel Ekwe	Nigeria	San Beda
2007	Jason Ballesteros	Philippines	San Sebastian
2008	Jason Ballesteros	Philippines	San Sebastian
2009	Sudan Daniel	United States	San Beda
2010	Sudan Daniel	United States	San Beda
2011	Ian Sangalang	Philippines	San Sebastian
2012	Raymond Almazan	Philippines	Letran
2013	Raymond Almazan	Philippines	Letran
2014	Joseph Gabayni	Philippines	Lyceum
2015	Allwell Oraeme	Nigeria	Mapúa
2016	Allwell Oraeme	Nigeria	Mapúa
2017	Prince Eze	Nigeria	Perpetual
2018	Prince Eze	Nigeria	Perpetual
2019	Justin Arana	Philippines	Arellano
2020	No tournament		
2021	Justin Arana	Philippines	Arellano
2022	Cade Flores	Philippines	Arellano
2023	Rommel Calahat	Philippines	San Sebastian
2024	Allen Liwag	Philippines	Benilde
2025	Jhuniel dela Rama	Philippines	San Sebastian

==== Juniors' tournament ====
Season	Name	Nationality	Team
2005	Darrel Green	Philippines	Letran
2006	Jake Pascual	Philippines	PCU
2007	Keith Agovida	Philippines	JRU
2008	Keith Agovida	Philippines	JRU
2009	Louie Vigil	Philippines	JRU
2010	Vincent Menguito	Philippines	EAC
2011	Sidney Onwubere	Philippines	EAC
2012	Enjerico Diego	Philippines	Malayan
2013	Prince Rivero	Philippines	LSGH
2014	John Winifred Gob	Philippines	LSGH
2015	John Umali	Philippines	Perpetual
2016	Aaron Fermin	Philippines	Arellano
2017	Aaron Fermin	Philippines	Arellano
2018	Aaron Fermin	Philippines	Arellano
2019	Jonnel Policarpio	Philippines	Malayan
2020	No tournament		
2021	No tournament		
2023	George Diamante	Philippines	Letran
2023	Paul Enal	Philippines	JRU
2024	Paul Enal	Philippines	JRU
2025 (S100)	Sean Franco	Philippines	Arellano
2025 (S101)	Sean Franco	Philippines	Arellano

=== Most Improved Player ===
==== Men's tournament ====
Season	Name	Nationality	Team
2005	Aaron Aban	Philippines	Letran
2006	Boyet Bautista	Philippines	Letran
2007	Marvin Hayes	Philippines	JRU
2008			
2009	Jake Pascual	Philippines	San Beda
2010	Joe Etame	Cameroon	JRU
2011	Raymond Almazan	Philippines	Letran
2012	Scottie Thompson	Philippines	Perpetual
2013	Michael Mabulac	Philippines	JRU
2014	Jio Jalalon	Philippines	Arellano
2015	Michael Calisaan	Philippines	San Sebastian
2016	Donald Tankoua	Cameroon	San Beda
2017	Jed Mendoza	Philippines	JRU
2018	Archie Concepcion	Philippines	Arellano
2019	Fran Yu	Philippines	Letran
2020	No tournament		
2021	Paolo Hernandez	Philippines	Malayan
2022	Shawn Umali	Philippines	Lyceum
2023	Jun Roque	Philippines	Perpetual
2024	Lorenz Capulong	Philippines	Arellano
2025	Renzo Abiera	Philippines	Arellano

==== Juniors' tournament ====
Season	Name	Nationality	Team
2005	Paolo Guidaben	Philippines	San Sebastian
2006	Michael Dizon	Philippines	Perpetual
2007	Christian dela Paz	Philippines	LSGH
2008			
2009	Chris Javier	Philippines	San Beda
2010	Flash Sadiwa	Philippines	Perpetual
2011	Francis Abarcar	Philippines	San Beda
2012	Justin Serrano	Philippines	Mapúa
2013	Kobe Paras	Philippines	LSGH
2014	John Winifred Gob	Philippines	LSGH
2015	Maui Cruz	Philippines	EAC
2016	Joshua Tagala	Philippines	San Beda
2017	Clint Escamis	Philippines	Malayan
2017	Neil Villapando	Philippines	Malayan
2018	John Amores	Philippines	JRU
2019	Yukien Andrada	Philippines	San Beda
2020	No tournament		
2021	No tournament		
2023	Seven Gagate	Philippines	LSGH
2024	EJ Castillo	Philippines	EAC
2025 (S100)	Jericho Cristino	Philippines	Perpetual
2025 (S101)	Laurence Pillas	Philippines	Arellano

=== Best Foreign Player ===
This award has only been awarded in the men's tournament.

Season	Name	Nationality	Team
2019	Donald Tankoua	Cameroon	San Beda

=== Best Defensive Foreign Player ===
This award has only been awarded in the men's tournament.

Season	Name	Nationality	Team
2019	Mike Harry Nzeusseu	Cameroon	Lyceum

== Scoring records ==
Lim Eng Beng of the De La Salle Green Archers currently holds the most points scored in an NCAA seniors' game when he scored 55 points in the 1974 season as he led De La Salle Green Archers to the championship. He scored an average of 32 points in that season which remains the all-time record in average points per game in Philippine Men's NCAA.

In 2009, Joshua Saret of the JRU Light Bombers scored 89 points against the AUF Baby Danes to shatter the all-time high mark set by ex-teammate Keith Agovida at 82 points on September 5, 2008, against the Malayan Red Robins.

Prior to their record-breaking feats, Marlon Bola Bola of the Letran Squires held the single-game record of 71 points in 1970.

=== Seniors' scoring leaders (since 2002) ===
Season	Name	Team	Avg.
2002	Sunday Salvacion	Benilde	20.3
2003	Ronald Capati	Benilde	19.1
2004	Noy Javier	Perpetual	20.7
2005	Redentor Vicente; Leo Najorda (tie)	San Sebastian; San Sebastian	17.5
2006	Khiel Misa	Perpetual	16.6
2007	Yousif Aljamal	San Beda	17.1
2008	RJ Jazul	Letran	14.7
2009	Argel Mendoza	EAC	20.9
2010	Carlo Lastimosa	Benilde	17.3
2011	Calvin Abueva	San Sebastian	20.6
2012	Calvin Abueva	San Sebastian	20.1
2013	Juneric Baloria	Perpetual	23.3
2014	Scottie Thompson	Perpetual	26.5
2015	Arthur dela Cruz	San Beda	19.7
2016	Jio Jalalon	Arellano	21.4
2017	CJ Perez	Lyceum	19.3
2018	Robert Bolick	San Beda	18.7
2019	Allyn Bulanadi	San Sebastian	20.3
2020 (Note: Season cancelled due to the COVID-19 pandemic.)	No tournament		
2021 (Note: Season postponed to early 2022 due to the COVID-19 pandemic.)	JM Calma	San Sebastian	16.9
2022	Will Gozum	Benilde	17.2
2023	Clint Escamis	Mapúa	16.3
2024	Paeng Are	San Sebastian	17.9
2025	Agjanti Miller	San Beda	19.8
2026	Lawrence Mangubat	JRU	17.1

Notes:

a. 2021-22 season was played in early 2022.

== Origin of team monikers ==
- Arellano Chiefs: Eponymous to the first Chief Justice of the Philippines, Cayetano Arellano, whom the university was named after.
- Letran Knights: The founder, Don Juan Geronimo Guerrero, was a Knight of Malta.
- Benilde Blazers: As homage to the college’s efforts in introducing several pioneering degree programs, the first of its kind in the country, such as Photography, Fashion Design and Merchandising, Performing Arts major in Dance, Production Design, Technical Theater, Music Production, Industrial Design to name a few, hence the moniker Blazers was adopted. It is a short term for trail blazers, which also emphasizes its commitment to set a standard for education as well as sports development.
- EAC Generals: Taken from the former name of the school, General Emilio Aguinaldo College, in honor of General Emilio Aguinaldo.
- JRU Heavy Bombers: World War II Japanese vintage bombs found in their campus.
- Lyceum Pirates: They are popularly known as Pirata ng Intramuros.
- Mapua Cardinals: From Major League Baseball's franchise, the St. Louis Cardinals, the favorite team of founder Tomas Mapua.
- San Beda Red Lions: Derived from the ancient British heraldic symbol, the Red Lion Rampant, which symbolizes courage. The Red Lion is a fitting symbol for a school named after the Venerable Bede of England, a Benedictine Saint and a great British intellectual.
- San Sebastian Golden Stags: A stag symbolizes a Christian who, filled with moral ideas, runs fast to God swiftly yet quietly in pursuit of his goals.
- Perpetual Altas: The moniker ‘Altas’ comes from the Latin word “height,” symbolizing UPHSD's aspirations for further greatness. At the same time, it comes from the initials of the school founder, Antonio L. Tamayo.

== Memberships ==
- San Beda University is the only remaining founding member in the association.
- San Beda is also the school with the longest span of membership, at 97 years.
- The newest school to join the association is the Lyceum of the Philippines University which joined the association in 2011.
- La Salle Green Hills competed as the junior team of two senior squads in the NCAA. It first competed as the junior team of DLSU then of CSB.
- There were 3 schools who were guest teams in Season 85: the Emilio Aguinaldo College, Arellano University and the Angeles University Foundation. In 2010, EAC and Arellano were back as probationary members. The Lyceum of the Philippines University also played as a guest team in 2011. In 2013 Arellano became a regular member, so were EAC and Lyceum in 2015.

== TV coverage ==
- DZAQ-TV Channel 3 (now ABS-CBN) (1954–1961)
- DZXL-TV Channel 9/4 (now ABS-CBN) (1961–1972)
- MBC-TV 11 (1967–72)
- BBC 2 (now ABS-CBN) (1973–78)
- KBS 9/RPN 9 (1972–80,1984–86)
- Vintage Sports on PTV-4 (1986–1995, 2000–2001) and IBC-13 (1996–1999)
- ABS-CBN Sports on Studio 23 (2002–2011) ABS-CBN Sports and Action (2015–2020), ABS-CBN Sports + Action HD (2016–2020)
- Sports5 on AKTV on IBC (2012), AksyonTV (2013–2014) and TV5 (2014)
- GMA Sports on GMA (2021–2024), GTV (2021–2025) and Heart of Asia (2024–2025)
- Cignal TV on One Sports (2026–present) and RPTV (2026–present) and NCAA NXT (2026–present)

== Commissioners ==
Season	Name
2006	Jun Bernardino
2007	Chito Narvasa
2008	Joe Lipa
2009	Aric del Rosario
2010	Aric del Rosario
2011	Aric del Rosario
2012	Joe Lipa
2013	Joe Lipa
2014	Bai Cristobal
2015	Bai Cristobal
2016	Andy Jao
2017	Bai Cristobal
2018	Bai Cristobal
2019	Tonichi Pujante
2020	Tonichi Pujante
2021–22	Tonichi Pujante
2022–23	Tonichi Pujante
2023–24	Tonichi Pujante
2024–25	Ogie Bernarte; Joel Ngo
2025	Rico Quicho
2026	Rico Quicho

== See also ==
- National Collegiate Athletic Association (Philippines)#History
- National Collegiate Athletic Association (Philippines)#Rivalries
- NCAA Final Four (Philippines)
- UAAP Basketball Champions
