= NCAA Season 95 =

2019-2020 athletic event in the Philippines

- Host school: Arellano University
- Tagline: "Kaisa sa Pagkakaiba" (transl. United in diversity)

General
- Seniors: Not awarded
- Juniors: Not awarded

Seniors' champions
Sport		Men	Women
Basketball		Letran	N/A
Chess		Perpetual	
Taekwondo		Benilde	Benilde
Table Tennis		San Beda	San Beda
Lawn Tennis		Benilde	San Beda
Swimming		San Beda	San Beda
Badminton		San Beda	
3x3 basketball		Arellano	N/A

Juniors' champions
Sport		Boys	Girls
Basketball		San Beda	N/A
Chess		San Beda	
Taekwondo		San Beda	
Table Tennis		San Beda	
Swimming		LSGH	
3x3 basketball		San Beda	
- (NT) = No tournament; (DS) = Demonstration Sport; (Ex) = Exhibition;

NCAA Season 95 was the 2019–20 collegiate athletic year of the National Collegiate Athletic Association (NCAA) of the Philippines. It was hosted by Arellano University. No overall championship title was awarded for this season due to the COVID-19 pandemic in the Philippines.

== Calendar ==
The customary opening basketball game between the season hosts and the defending champions was changed to the second game. Instead, 2019 third placers Letran and runners-up Lyceum played in the opening game on July 7 at the Mall of Asia Arena, with Arellano and San Beda playing in the main game of the doubleheader.

Second semester sports was rescheduled to give way to the country's hosting of the 2019 Southeast Asian Games. Women's lawn tennis was elevated as a regular sport, and a tournament for hado will be held, with the winner going to Japan representing the NCAA.

Several sports events were cancelled due to the impact of the COVID-19 pandemic in the Philippines. No overall championship title was awarded.

== Basketball ==
=== Seniors' tournament ===
==== Elimination round ====
Pos	Team	W	L	PCT	GB	Qualification
1	San Beda Red Lions	18	0	1.000	—	Advance to the Finals (Note: As San Beda won all elimination round games, the stepladder format will be used instead of the regular Final Four format.)
2	LPU Pirates	13	5	.722	5	Proceed to stepladder round 2
3	Letran Knights	12	6	.667	6	Proceed to stepladder round 1
4	San Sebastian Stags	11	7	.611	7	Proceed to stepladder round 1
5	Benilde Blazers	9	9	.500 (Note: Head-to-head point differential: Benilde +10, Mapua −10)	9	
6	Mapúa Cardinals	9	9	.500	9	
7	Perpetual Altas	5	13	.278 (Note: Head-to-head point differential: Perpetual +6, JRU −6)	13	
8	JRU Heavy Bombers	5	13	.278	13	
9	EAC Generals	4	14	.222 (Note: Head-to-head point differential: EAC +18, Arellano −18)	14	
10	Arellano Chiefs (H)	4	14	.222	14	

Source: ABS-CBN Sports
(H) Hosts

==== Playoffs ====
Stepladder round 1 (Single-elimination)
3	Letran	85
4	San Sebastian	80

Stepladder round 2 (Single-elimination)
2	Lyceum	88
3	Letran	92

Finals (Best-of-three playoff)
1	San Beda	64	79	79
3	Letran	65	76	81

=== Juniors' tournament ===
==== Elimination round ====
Pos	Team	W	L	PCT	GB	Qualification
1	San Beda Red Cubs	17	1	.944	—	Twice-to-beat in the semifinals
2	LPU Junior Pirates	11	7	.611	6	Twice-to-beat in the semifinals
3	San Sebastian Staglets	10	8	.556 (Note: Head-to-head point differential: San Sebastian +8, LSGH +5, Arellano −13; fourth-seed playoff: LSGH 66–52 Arellano)	7	Twice-to-win in the semifinals
4	La Salle Green Hills Greenies	10	8	.556	7	Twice-to-win in the semifinals
5	Arellano Braves (H)	10	8	.556	7	
6	JRU Light Bombers	9	9	.500	8	
7	Letran Squires	8	10	.444	9	
8	Perpetual Junior Altas	7	11	.389	10	
9	Mapúa Red Robins	6	12	.333	11	
10	EAC–ICA Brigadiers	2	16	.111	15	

Updated to match(es) played on September 20, 2019. Source: ABS-CBN Sports
(H) Hosts

==== Playoffs ====
Semifinals (Nos. 1 & 2 have twice-to-beat advantage)
1	San Beda–Rizal	82
4	LSGH	79
2	Lyceum–Cavite	75	78
3	San Sebastian	84	76

Finals (Best-of-three series)
1	San Beda–Rizal	94	76	98
2	Lyceum–Cavite	80	78	77

== Volleyball ==
All volleyball tournaments were canceled due to the COVID-19 pandemic.

=== Men's tournament ===
==== Elimination round ====
Pos	Team	Pld	W	L	Pts	SW	SL	SR	SPW	SPL	SPR	Qualification
1	Perpetual Altas	9	9	0	27	27	2	13.500	736	566	1.300	Advance to the Finals
2	EAC Generals	9	7	2	22	23	9	2.556	771	668	1.154	Proceed to stepladder round 1
3	Arellano Chiefs (H)	8	6	2	16	20	12	1.667	728	695	1.047	Proceed to stepladder round 2
4	Benilde Blazers	7	5	2	14	16	9	1.778	562	535	1.050	Proceed to stepladder round 2
5	San Beda Red Lions	8	4	4	13	15	14	1.071	644	711	0.906	
6	Mapúa Cardinals	8	4	4	12	15	14	1.071	640	675	0.948	
7	Letran Knights	8	2	6	6	8	19	0.421	544	643	0.846	
8	LPU Pirates	8	2	6	5	7	21	0.333	604	665	0.908	
9	San Sebastian Stags	8	1	7	4	6	21	0.286	568	635	0.894	
10	JRU Heavy Bombers	9	1	8	4	8	24	0.333	677	777	0.871	

Updated to match(es) played on February 11, 2020. Source: ABS-CBN Sports
Rules for classification: 1) Number of wins; 2) if tied for #2 or #4, one-game playoff; 3) head-to-head record; 4) match points; 5) sets ratio; 6) points ratio
(H) Host

Point system:

3 points = win match in 3 or 4 sets
2 points = win match in 5 sets
1 point = lose match in 5 sets
0 point = lose match in 3 or 4 sets

=== Women's tournament ===
==== Elimination round ====
Pos	Team	Pld	W	L	Pts	SW	SL	SR	SPW	SPL	SPR	Qualification
1	Benilde Lady Blazers	7	7	0	20	21	4	5.250	593	477	1.243	Twice-to-beat in the semifinals
2	Arellano Lady Chiefs (H)	8	7	1	22	23	5	4.600	603	487	1.238	Twice-to-beat in the semifinals
3	San Beda Red Lionesses	8	6	2	17	19	9	2.111	662	545	1.215	Twice-to-win in the semifinals
4	Perpetual Lady Altas	9	6	3	16	21	17	1.235	846	782	1.082	Twice-to-win in the semifinals
5	Letran Lady Knights	8	4	4	10	15	17	0.882	670	710	0.944	
6	JRU Lady Bombers	9	4	5	12	14	18	0.778	677	709	0.955	
7	LPU Lady Pirates	8	3	5	12	16	15	1.067	693	663	1.045	
8	San Sebastian Lady Stags	8	2	6	8	12	19	0.632	617	707	0.873	
9	Mapúa Lady Cardinals	8	1	7	4	5	22	0.227	504	665	0.758	
10	EAC Lady Generals	9	1	8	2	6	26	0.231	569	689	0.826	

Updated to match(es) played on February 11, 2020. Source: ABS-CBN Sports
Rules for classification: 1) Number of wins; 2) if tied for #2 or #4, one-game playoff; 3) head-to-head record; 4) match points; 5) sets ratio; 6) points ratio
(H) Host

Point system:

3 points = win match in 3 or 4 sets
2 points = win match in 5 sets
1 point = lose match in 5 sets
0 point = lose match in 3 or 4 sets

=== Boys' tournament ===
==== Elimination round ====
Pos	Team	Pld	W	L	Pts	SW	SL	SR	SPW	SPL	SPR	Qualification
1	Arellano Braves (H)	7	7	0	19	21	5	4.200	611	492	1.242	Twice-to-beat in the semifinals
2	Perpetual Junior Altas	6	5	1	16	17	3	5.667	478	234	2.043	Twice-to-beat in the semifinals
3	EAC–ICA Brigadiers	7	5	2	16	18	8	2.250	615	522	1.178	Twice-to-win in the semifinals
4	San Beda Red Cubs	6	4	2	12	12	8	1.500	461	393	1.173	Twice-to-win in the semifinals
5	Letran Squires	6	4	2	11	13	8	1.625	503	440	1.143	
6	San Sebastian Staglets	7	4	3	10	13	13	1.000	540	527	1.025	
7	LPU Junior Pirates	7	3	4	10	12	13	0.923	554	559	0.991	
8	Mapúa Red Robins	7	1	6	5	9	18	0.500	566	629	0.900	
9	La Salle Green Hills Greenies	6	0	6	0	0	18	0.000	190	450	0.422	
10	JRU Light Bombers	7	0	7	0	0	21	0.000	365	533	0.685	

Updated to match(es) played on February 6, 2020. Source: ABS-CBN Sports
Rules for classification: 1) Number of wins; 2) if tied for #2 or #4, one-game playoff; 3) head-to-head record; 4) match points; 5) sets ratio; 6) points ratio
(H) Host

Point system:

3 points = win match in 3 or 4 sets
2 points = win match in 5 sets
1 point = lose match in 5 sets
0 point = lose match in 3 or 4 sets

=== Girls' tournament ===
==== Elimination round ====
Pos	Team	Pld	W	L	Pts	SW	SL	SR	SPW	SPL	SPR
1	Arellano Lady Braves (H)	3	3	0	9	9	0	MAX	226	103	2.194
2	Perpetual Junior Lady Altas	3	2	1	6	6	3	2.000	197	103	1.913
3	San Sebastian Lady Staglets	3	1	2	3	3	7	0.429	165	229	0.721
4	LPU Junior Lady Pirates	3	0	3	0	1	9	0.111	147	246	0.598

Updated to match(es) played on February 6, 2020. Source: ABS-CBN Sports
Rules for classification: 1) Number of wins; 2) if tied for #2 or #4, one-game playoff; 3) head-to-head record; 4) match points; 5) sets ratio; 6) points ratio
(H) Host

Point system:

3 points = win match in 3 or 4 sets
2 points = win match in 5 sets
1 point = lose match in 5 sets
0 point = lose match in 3 or 4 sets

== See also ==
- UAAP Season 82

== Broadcast coverage ==
Play by Play

- Anton Roxas

Courtside Reporter

- Senorita Vashti
- Jeiel Magboo
- Trisha Maulion
- Aubrey Bareno
- Gio Cortes
