= NCAA Season 87 basketball tournaments =

NCAA Season 87
- Brazen @87
- Host school: University of Perpetual Help System DALTA
Men's Finals	G1	G2	Wins
San Beda Red Lions	75	57	2
San Sebastian Stags	63	55	0
- Duration: October 24–26, 2011
- Arena: Smart Araneta Coliseum
- Finals MVP: Dave Marcelo
- Winning coach: Frankie Lim (4th title)
- Semifinalists: Letran Knights; JRU Heavy Bombers
- TV networks: Studio 23, The Filipino Channel, Balls HD
Juniors' Finals	G1	G2	G3	Wins
San Beda Red Cubs	82	74	69	2+1
La Salle Green Hills Greenies	85	73	61	1
- Duration: October 24-November 3, 2011
- Arenas: Smart Araneta Coliseum (Game 1); Filoil Flying V Arena (Games 2 & 3)
- Finals MVP: Francis Abarcar
- Winning coach: Britt Reroma (2nd title)
- Semifinalists: Letran Squires; EAC–ICA Brigadiers
- TV networks: Studio 23, Balls HD (Game 1 only)

The basketball tournaments of NCAA Season 87 are the Philippines' National Collegiate Athletic Association tournaments for basketball in its 2011–12 season. University of Perpetual Help System DALTA hosted the season, starting with an opening ceremony held on July 2, 2011 followed by a triple-header game. Games then are subsequently being held at Filoil Flying V Arena, with men's games on Wednesdays, Fridays and select Monday games aired by Studio 23.

In the men's tournament, the San Beda Red Lions successfully defended their championship, sweeping the San Sebastian Stags in a rematch of the last two championship series. Both teams started undefeated, with San Sebastian winning the first round finale against the Red Lions, finally ending San Beda's league record 26-game winning streak. The Stags extended their winning streak to 15 games until they were defeated by the Letran Knights. The Red Lions, after being beaten by the JRU Heavy Bombers, ended the second round with a six-game winning run. They beat San Sebastian in the last elimination round game to force a playoff for the first seed, a game they subsequently won. The Red Lions then met JRU in the semifinals, which also had their own six-game winning run after a 3–9 start. The Red Lions won, advancing to the finals for the sixth consecutive year. The Stags and the Knights met in the other semifinal, where the Knights extended the series to a deciding game; the Stags won on Game 2 to qualify for the finals anew. In the Finals, San Beda won Game 1 convincingly, while the Stags missed on a chance to force overtime on Game 2 to give San Beda their second consecutive title. Dave Marcelo was named the Finals MVP.

In the juniors' tournament, the San Beda Red Cubs won all 18 elimination round games to qualify outright to the finals with the thrice to beat advantage. The EAC-ICA Brigadiers, a team under probation, qualified for their first NCAA playoff appearance; they were beaten in the first round of the stepladder series by the La Salle Green Hills Greenies to face the Letran Squires in the next round. The Greenies led for much of the game until they quelled an end-game rally by Letran to clinch the school's first NCAA finals berth. The Greenies prevented a Red Cubs season sweep, winning Game 1 of the finals.

== Preseason ==
The San Sebastian Stags announced that their former coach Turo Valenzona had been named as their new head coach, four months after Ato Agustin left to coach the San Miguel Beermen in the Philippine Basketball Association. Valenzona had previously coached the Stags in the 1990s, winning four consecutive championships from 1993 to 1996, with the 1996 season finishing undefeated. Valenzona would be the league's oldest head coach at 68 years old.

Paul Nuilan and Marlon Gomez, the two players from the UPHSD Altas who were not allowed to play last year, were cleared to play this season. This gave coach Boris Aldeguer optimism for the upcoming season.

In the preseason tournaments, defending champions San Beda Red Lions were defeated by the UAAP champions Ateneo Blue Eagles in the final of the Filoil Flying V Pre-Season Cup 75–56. The Red Cubs defeated the Philippines under-16 basketball team 79–70 to win the juniors event, with Francis Abarcar being named most valuable player. San Beda's Garvo Lanete and Yousef Taha of the Mapúa Cardinals were named members of the mythical team. In the Father Martin Cup, Mapua was defeated by the NU Bulldogs of the UAAP in the men's final, 87–83 in overtime.

The league announced a partnership with SM Supermalls in marketing the league; next season's basketball tournaments are to be held at the yet-to-be-finished SM Arena, as the arena is accessible to most of the member schools. Also, in an effort to "go green", the league announced that the tickets used for the basketball tournaments will be produced under an environment-friendly system. The creation of ticket-on-demand system prevents the accumulation of unsold tickets that are stored every year, and reduces the amount of paper used.

The UPHSD Altas announced on June 27 that head coach Boris Aldeguer resigned. While no reason was given, sources of the Philippine Daily Inquirer stated that the non-inclusion of a UPHSD player by the NCAA board was the cause of his resignation. Aldeguer's assistant Jimwell Gican was named as the new head coach. While the NCAA board allowed UPHSD player Marlon Gomez to play after sitting out last season to residency, UPHSD president Anthony Tamayo announced that he will not be entered during the games; this also came after the board disallowed another player, Paul Nuilan, who allegedly misrepresented documents on his transfer from Far Eastern University to Letran to Perpetual. Gomez was almost cleared to play for Perpetual in 2010 until JRU showed documents that he had enrolled there after transferring from Philippine Christian University.

The San Sebastian Stags announced that head coach Turo Valenzona was elevated as team consultant, while Topex Robinson was named as the new head coach days prior to the opening. Robinson was Valenzona's player during San Sebastian's 1996 title run and won another title with the Stags in 1997 before turning professional.

== Men's tournament ==
The men's tournaments began on July 2, 2011 after the opening ceremonies at the Araneta Coliseum, Quezon City. Thereafter, the rest of the first round games were held at the Filoil Flying V Arena, San Juan.

=== Teams ===
Team	College	Coach
Arellano Chiefs	Arellano University (AU)	(Philippines) Leo Isaac
Letran Knights	Colegio de San Juan de Letran (CSJL)	(Philippines) Louie Alas
Benilde Blazers	De La Salle–College of Saint Benilde (CSB)	(Philippines) Richard del Rosario
EAC Generals	Emilio Aguinaldo College (EAC)	(Philippines) Gerry Esplana
JRU Heavy Bombers	José Rizal University (JRU)	(Philippines) Vergel Meneses
Lyceum Pirates	Lyceum of the Philippines University (LPU)	(Philippines) Bonnie Tan
Mapúa Cardinals	Mapúa Institute of Technology (MIT)	(Philippines) Chito Victolero
San Beda Red Lions	San Beda College (SBC)	(Philippines) Frankie Lim
San Sebastian Stags	San Sebastian College – Recoletos (SSC-R)	(Philippines) Topex Robinson
Perpetual Altas	University of Perpetual Help System DALTA (UPHSD)	(Philippines) Jimwell Gican

==== Changes from last season ====
Guest team:

- Lyceum Pirates

=== Elimination round ===
==== Team standings ====
Pos	Team	W	L	PCT	GB	Qualification
1	San Beda Red Lions	16	2	.889 (Note: First-seed playoff: San Beda 88–85 San Sebastian)	—	Twice-to-beat in the semifinals
2	San Sebastian Stags	16	2	.889	—	Twice-to-beat in the semifinals
3	Letran Knights	14	4	.778	2	Twice-to-win in the semifinals
4	JRU Heavy Bombers	9	9	.500	7	Twice-to-win in the semifinals
5	Mapúa Cardinals	7	11	.389 (Note: Head-to-head record: Mapúa 1–1 Lyceum (Mapúa +18))	9	
6	Lyceum Pirates (G)	7	11	.389	9	
7	Arellano Chiefs (X)	6	12	.333 (Note: Head-to-head record: Arellano 1–1 Benilde (Arellano +2))	10	
8	Benilde Blazers	6	12	.333	10	
9	Perpetual Altas (H)	5	13	.278	11	
10	EAC Generals (X)	4	14	.222	12	

Source: ABS-CBN Sports
Rules for classification: 1) winning percentage; 2) if tied for top 4, one-game playoff; 3) head-to-head record; 4) overall point differential
(G) Guests; (H) Hosts; (X) Under probation

==== Match-up results ====
	Round 1									Round 2								
Team ╲ Game	1	2	3	4	5	6	7	8	9	10	11	12	13	14	15	16	17	18
Arellano	EAC school colors	JRU school colors	Letran school colors	San Beda school colors	Lyceum school colors	Mapua school colors	SSC-R school colors	CSB school colors	UPHD school colors	Letran school colors	EAC school colors	SSC-R school colors	CSB school colors	JRU school colors	Lyceum school colors	San Beda school colors	Mapua school colors	UPHD school colors
Letran	Mapua school colors	UPHD school colors	Arellano school colors	SSC-R school colors	CSB school colors	San Beda school colors	Lyceum school colors	EAC school colors	JRU school colors	Arellano school colors	JRU school colors	Mapua school colors	Lyceum school colors	EAC school colors	UPHD school colors	SSC-R school colors	CSB school colors	San Beda school colors
Benilde	Lyceum school colors	SSC-R school colors	Mapua school colors	San Beda school colors	Letran school colors	UPHD school colors	JRU school colors	Arellano school colors	EAC school colors	Mapua school colors	UPHD school colors	Arellano school colors	SSC-R school colors	JRU school colors	San Beda school colors	Letran school colors	EAC school colors	Lyceum school colors
EAC	Arellano school colors	JRU school colors	Lyceum school colors	Mapua school colors	San Beda school colors	SSC-R school colors	UPHD school colors	Letran school colors	CSB school colors	SSC-R school colors	Arellano school colors	San Beda school colors	UPHD school colors	Lyceum school colors	Letran school colors	Mapua school colors	CSB school colors	JRU school colors
JRU	SSC-R school colors	Arellano school colors	EAC school colors	Mapua school colors	UPHD school colors	CSB school colors	San Beda school colors	Lyceum school colors	Letran school colors	Lyceum school colors	Letran school colors	SSC-R school colors	Arellano school colors	San Beda school colors	CSB school colors	UPHD school colors	Mapua school colors	EAC school colors
Lyceum	CSB school colors	UPHD school colors	San Beda school colors	EAC school colors	Mapua school colors	Arellano school colors	SSC-R school colors	Letran school colors	JRU school colors	JRU school colors	Mapua school colors	UPHD school colors	Letran school colors	Arellano school colors	EAC school colors	San Beda school colors	SSC-R school colors	CSB school colors
Mapúa	Letran school colors	CSB school colors	Lyceum school colors	JRU school colors	EAC school colors	Arellano school colors	San Beda school colors	SSC-R school colors	UPHD school colors	CSB school colors	UPHD school colors	Lyceum school colors	Letran school colors	SSC-R school colors	San Beda school colors	EAC school colors	Arellano school colors	JRU school colors
San Beda	UPHD school colors	Lyceum school colors	Arellano school colors	CSB school colors	EAC school colors	Letran school colors	Mapua school colors	JRU school colors	SSC-R school colors	UPHD school colors	EAC school colors	JRU school colors	Mapua school colors	Arellano school colors	CSB school colors	Lyceum school colors	Letran school colors	SSC-R school colors
San Sebastian	JRU school colors	CSB school colors	UPHD school colors	Letran school colors	Lyceum school colors	EAC school colors	Arellano school colors	Mapua school colors	San Beda school colors	EAC school colors	Arellano school colors	JRU school colors	CSB school colors	UPHD school colors	Mapua school colors	Letran school colors	Lyceum school colors	San Beda school colors
Perpetual	San Beda school colors	Lyceum school colors	Letran school colors	SSC-R school colors	JRU school colors	CSB school colors	EAC school colors	Mapua school colors	Arellano school colors	San Beda school colors	CSB school colors	Mapua school colors	Lyceum school colors	EAC school colors	SSC-R school colors	JRU school colors	Letran school colors	Arellano school colors

= Win; = OT win; = Loss; = OT loss

==== Scores ====
Team	AU	CSJL	CSB	EAC	JRU	LPU	MIT	SBC	SSC-R	UPHSD
Arellano Chiefs		70–88	64–60	77–84	79–75*	74–84	70–73	67–92	79–92	71–65
Letran Knights	73–59		112–91	76–67	70–59	92–89*	75–65	62–77	62–71	74–43
Benilde Blazers	66–64	60–72		80–68	78–77	63–75	70–67	78–79	78–86	88–83
EAC Generals	70–78	58–80	73–82		60–76	73–67	63–80	62–103	70–77	71–58
JRU Heavy Bombers	79–69	56–75	78–63	90–77		74–68	80–79	69–77	67–73	77–79***
Lyceum Pirates	77–89	74–88	94–89*	77–73	71–65		76–73	69–89	57–82	93–87
Mapúa Cardinals	69–73	67–69*	94–90	98–73	64–78	80–59		68–74	66–71	65–63
San Beda Red Lions	84–60	84–68	84–75	118–64	65–76	101–67	76–59		68–70	82–52
San Sebastian Stags	97–70	81–82*	86–70	99–63	78–59	80–68	72–69	70–91		87–60
Perpetual Altas	77–60	68–53	63–57	71–77	57–64	78–73	62–65	55–69	76–77	

Legend: Blue = left column team win; Red = top row team win.
Matches with lighter background shading were decided after overtime.

=== Postseason teams ===
==== San Beda Red Lions ====
With Borgie Hermida leaving the team and Sudan Daniel not playing due to an injury, the Red Lions had to find other ways to keep its championship form. Fresh from last season's sweep, the Red Lions had an 8-game winning streak to start the season adding up to a 26-game winning streak. The streak was ended by the San Sebastian Stags, last year's runner-up. With the Red Lions hoping that it would be the only loss they will have this season, JRU gave them their second loss after a 2-week break. With that loss, the Red Lions made sure they won't have another loss this season. They defeated the Stags on the last day of elimination with both teams tied for the top spot. A playoff was held and the Red Lions won which gave them the top seed and the Stags settling for second. This was another great year for the school as they finished as champions and the juniors team also ending up as champions giving them a back-to-back double championship title.

==== San Sebastian Stags ====
Last season's runner-up was seeking for redemption against the defending champions, the Red Lions. The Stags started the season with an impressive 15-game winning streak only to be ended by the Letran Knights. Because of this, some fans thought that the 85th season would repeat as for the saying "history will repeat itself". Many were hoping that even though the Red Lions will take the top seed, the Stags will still be the champions. The loss of Borgie Hermida and Sudan Daniel made them confident that they will defeat the Red Lions in any game. They gave the Red Lions their first loss since the 85th season with the so-called Pinatubo Trio contributing most of the team's points. The second round meet-up with the Red Lions was pretty disappointing for the school with the fans confident they will take it also like they did in the first round meeting. The Pinatubo Trio was not in action during that game and their performance was pretty disappointing with the game ending at 70-91 in favor of the Red Lions. Before that meeting, the Stags already had its first loss given by the Knights with the game ending at 81-82 with overtime. As the Stags were tied up with the Red Lions for the top spot, a playoff was held with the Red Lions winning it.

==== Letran Knights ====
With the Letran Knights finishing with a disappointing 5th place last season, the team had to find depth from all the players. Last season was their first time not being in the final four in years as they are seen as one of the dominant teams, it was pretty embarrassing. They started the season with a 3-game winning streak to be ended by the Stags with a 62-71 game in favor of the opponent. Another loss was given to them by the defending champions, the Red Lions, with a lopsided 62-77 game. Although they weren't upset that they lost to these teams, th second round gave them some disappointments. They lost to the UPHSD Altas, a team seen as one of the weakest teams as they always finish in last every season recently. Although in their next game, they won against the Stags giving them their first loss of the season. The team might be celebrating from this win, their next game was against San Beda. Again, they lost to the Red Lions with their coach frustrated how they can win against the Stags but not against the Red Lions. They ended the season with a satisfactory 3rd-place finish with a record of 14-4 and a loss from San Beda.

==== JRU Heavy Bombers ====
The Bombers started the season with a back-to-back loss from the San Sebastian Stags and the Arellano Chiefs. Their first win is against the EAC Generals, the team that finished in last place this season. With the Bombers finishing 3rd place last season, the Bombers was still looking for an end to their 38-year title drought, the longest in the history of the NCAA. They were defeated by the Altas in their fifth game, frustrating their head coach and the school shocked. This was followed by another back-to-back losses from CSB Blazers and the defending champions, the San Beda Red Lions. Their first round was very disappointing and isn't showing the light for ending their title drought. Their second was, fortunately, was pretty impressive. They might have started the round with a 3-game losing streak but countered it with a 6-game winning streak up until the end of the eliminations, in it is a win against the Red Lions giving the Lions their second and last loss in the season. They finished in fourth place but this wasn't enough to end their 38-year title drought.

=== First seed playoff ===
Studio 23

October 14

San Beda Red Lions	88–85	San Sebastian Stags

Filoil Flying V Arena, San Juan

=== Bracket ===
Semifinals (Top 2 twice-to-beat)
1	San Beda	83
4	JRU	74
2	San Sebastian	62	63
3	Letran	70	56

Finals (Best-of-three playoff)
1	San Beda	75	57
2	San Sebastian	63	55

=== Semifinals ===
San Beda and San Sebastian have the twice-to-beat advantage. They only have to win once, while their opponents, twice, to progress.

==== (1) San Beda vs (4) JRU ====
Studio 23

October 17

San Beda Red Lions	83–74	JRU Heavy Bombers
San Beda wins series in one game

Filoil Flying V Arena, San Juan

==== (2) San Sebastian vs (3) Letran ====
Studio 23

October 17

San Sebastian Stags	62–70	Letran Knights

Filoil Flying V Arena, San Juan

Studio 23

October 19

San Sebastian Stags	63–56	Letran Knights
San Sebastian wins series in two games

Filoil Flying V Arena, San Juan

=== Finals ===
Studio 23

October 24

San Beda Red Lions	75–63	San Sebastian Stags
Scoring by quarter: 20-20, 15-18, 17-14, 23-11
Pts: Jess Villahermosa 15; Rebs: Baser Amer 8 Asts: Baser Amer 7		Pts: Ronald Pascual 14; Rebs: Ronald Pascual 11; Asts: Calvin Abueva 4

Smart Araneta Coliseum, Quezon City

Studio 23

October 26

San Beda Red Lions	57–55	San Sebastian Stags
Scoring by quarter: 14-15, 13–17, 21-18, 9-5
Pts: David Semerad 15; Rebs: Dave Marcelo 16; Asts: Dave Marcelo 3		Pts: Ronald Pascual 15; Rebs: Ian Sangalang 8 Asts: Calvin Abueva 5
San Beda wins series 2–0

Smart Araneta Coliseum, Quezon City

- Finals Most Valuable Player: Dave Marcelo (San Beda Red Lions)
- Coach of the Year: Frankie Lim (San Beda Red Lions)

=== Awards ===
NCAA Season 87 men's basketball champions
San Beda Red Lions
16th title, second consecutive title

The end-of-season awards were given prior to Game 1 of the men's finals at the Smart Araneta Coliseum.

- Most Valuable Player: Calvin Abueva (San Sebastian Stags)
- Mythical Five:
  - Raymond Almazan (Letran Knights)
  - Garvo Lanete (San Beda Red Lions)
  - Kevin Alas (Letran Knights)
  - Ian Sangalang (San Sebastian Stags)
  - Calvin Abueva (San Sebastian Stags)
- Rookie of the Year: Josan Nimes (Mapúa Cardinals)
- Defensive Player of the Year: Ian Sangalang (San Sebastian Stags)
- Most Improved Player: Raymond Almazan (Letran Knights)

==== Players of the Week ====
Week	Player	Team
Week 1	Allan Santos	Lyceum
Week 2	Calvin Abueva	San Sebastian
Week 3	Floricel Guevarra	Lyceum
Week 4	Garvo Lanete	San Beda
Week 5	Carlo Lastimosa	Benilde
Week 6	Ronald Pascual	San Sebastian
Week 7	Calvin Abueva; Ian Sangalang	San Sebastian; San Sebastian
Week 8	Josan Nîmes	Mapúa
Week 9	Kevin Alas	Letran
Week 10	Kevin Alas	Letran
Week 11	Nate Matute	JRU
Week 12	Jeckster Apinan	JRU
Week 13	Kevin Alas	Letran
Week 14	Garvo Lanete; Anthony Semerad	San Beda; San Beda
Week 15	Garvo Lanete	San Beda

== Juniors' tournament ==
The juniors' tournament started on July 4 with all games being held at the Filoil Flying V Arena.

=== Elimination round ===
==== Team standings ====
Pos	Team	W	L	PCT	GB	Qualification
1	San Beda Red Cubs	18	0	1.000	—	Thrice-to-beat in the Finals (Note: As San Beda won all of their elimination round games, the stepladder format will be used instead of the regular Final Four format.)
2	Letran Squires	14	4	.778	4	Proceed to stepladder round 2
3	La Salle Green Hills Greenies	13	5	.722	5	Proceed to stepladder round 1
4	EAC–ICA Brigadiers (X)	12	6	.667	6	Proceed to stepladder round 1
5	Mapúa Red Robins	10	8	.556	8	
6	San Sebastian Staglets	8	10	.444 (Note: Head-to-head record: San Sebastian 2–0 Arellano)	10	
7	Arellano Braves (X)	8	10	.444	10	
8	JRU Light Bombers	5	13	.278	13	
9	Perpetual Junior Altas (H)	2	16	.111	16	
10	Lyceum Junior Pirates (G)	0	18	.000	18	

Source: ABS-CBN Sports
Rules for classification: 1) winning percentage; 2) if tied for top 4, one-game playoff; 3) head-to-head record; 4) overall point differential
(G) Guests; (H) Hosts; (X) Under probation

==== Match-up results ====
	Round 1									Round 2								
Team ╲ Game	1	2	3	4	5	6	7	8	9	10	11	12	13	14	15	16	17	18
Arellano	EAC school colors	JRU school colors	Letran school colors	San Beda school colors	Lyceum school colors	Mapua school colors	SSC-R school colors	CSB school colors	UPHD school colors	Letran school colors	EAC school colors	SSC-R school colors	CSB school colors	JRU school colors	Lyceum school colors	San Beda school colors	Mapua school colors	UPHD school colors
Letran	Mapua school colors	UPHD school colors	Arellano school colors	SSC-R school colors	CSB school colors	San Beda school colors	Lyceum school colors	EAC school colors	JRU school colors	Arellano school colors	JRU school colors	Mapua school colors	Lyceum school colors	EAC school colors	UPHD school colors	CSB school colors	San Beda school colors	SSC-R school colors
LSGH	Lyceum school colors	SSC-R school colors	Mapua school colors	San Beda school colors	Letran school colors	UPHD school colors	JRU school colors	Arellano school colors	EAC school colors	Mapua school colors	UPHD school colors	Arellano school colors	SSC-R school colors	JRU school colors	San Beda school colors	Letran school colors	EAC school colors	Lyceum school colors
EAC	Arellano school colors	JRU school colors	Lyceum school colors	Mapua school colors	San Beda school colors	SSC-R school colors	UPHD school colors	Letran school colors	CSB school colors	SSC-R school colors	Arellano school colors	San Beda school colors	UPHD school colors	Lyceum school colors	Letran school colors	Mapua school colors	CSB school colors	JRU school colors
JRU	SSC-R school colors	Arellano school colors	EAC school colors	Mapua school colors	UPHD school colors	CSB school colors	San Beda school colors	Lyceum school colors	Letran school colors	Lyceum school colors	Letran school colors	SSC-R school colors	Arellano school colors	San Beda school colors	CSB school colors	UPHD school colors	Mapua school colors	EAC school colors
Lyceum	CSB school colors	UPHD school colors	San Beda school colors	EAC school colors	Mapua school colors	Arellano school colors	SSC-R school colors	Letran school colors	JRU school colors	JRU school colors	Mapua school colors	UPHD school colors	Letran school colors	Arellano school colors	EAC school colors	San Beda school colors	SSC-R school colors	CSB school colors
MHSS	Letran school colors	CSB school colors	Lyceum school colors	JRU school colors	EAC school colors	Arellano school colors	San Beda school colors	SSC-R school colors	UPHD school colors	CSB school colors	UPHD school colors	Lyceum school colors	Letran school colors	SSC-R school colors	San Beda school colors	EAC school colors	Arellano school colors	JRU school colors
SBC–R	Lyceum school colors	UPHD school colors	Arellano school colors	CSB school colors	EAC school colors	Letran school colors	Mapua school colors	JRU school colors	SSC-R school colors	UPHD school colors	EAC school colors	JRU school colors	Mapua school colors	Arellano school colors	CSB school colors	Lyceum school colors	Letran school colors	SSC-R school colors
SSC–R	JRU school colors	CSB school colors	UPHD school colors	Letran school colors	Lyceum school colors	EAC school colors	Arellano school colors	Mapua school colors	San Beda school colors	EAC school colors	Arellano school colors	JRU school colors	CSB school colors	UPHD school colors	Mapua school colors	Lyceum school colors	Letran school colors	San Beda school colors
UPHSD	Lyceum school colors	Letran school colors	SSC-R school colors	San Beda school colors	JRU school colors	CSB school colors	EAC school colors	Mapua school colors	Arellano school colors	San Beda school colors	CSB school colors	Mapua school colors	Lyceum school colors	EAC school colors	SSC-R school colors	JRU school colors	Letran school colors	Arellano school colors

= Win; = OT win; = Loss; = OT loss

==== Scores ====
Team	AU	CSJL	LSGH	EAC	JRU	LPU	MHSS	SBC-R	SSC-R	UPHSD
Arellano Braves		66–73	64–61	73–81	86–77*	115–33	74–88	70–90	63–68	81–67
Letran Squires	66–50		77–80	77–54	89–76	107–45	72–64	72–84	74–60	69–44
La Salle Green Hills Greenies	82–77	60–74		73–78	75–54	93–23	88–64	79–95	86–65	88–48
EAC-ICA Brigadiers	62–57	66–72	67–84		78–70	106–27	77–75	59–87	53–80	74–64
JRU Light Bombers	53–55	67–79	51–85	60–74		123–41	66–78	38–92	58–70	87–63
Lyceum Junior Pirates	49–114	37–83	45–118	37–116	66–110		33–135	28–163	41–117	37–107
Malayan Red Robins	62–66	73–67	64–75	73–74	63–58	127–46		56–72	80–56	107–88
San Beda Red Cubs	79–59	88–63	92–80	78–57	78–60	154–35	82–75		97–68	101–62
San Sebastian Staglets	75–67	65–85	53–82	68–77	48–50	100–25	64–75	68–96		75–65
Perpetual Junior Altas	65–96	65–94	52–78	70–75	67–98	76–46	72–100	68–113	57–89	

Legend: Blue = left column team win; Red = top row team win.
Matches with lighter background shading were decided after overtime.

=== Bracket ===
Stepladder round 1 (Single-elimination)
3	LSGH	88
4	EAC–ICA	74

Stepladder round 2 (Single-elimination)
2	Letran	91
3	LSGH	101

Finals (No. 1 thrice-to-beat)
1	San Beda	82	74	69
3	LSGH	85	73	61

=== Stepladder semifinals ===
All games are single-elimination.

==== (3) LSGH vs. (4) EAC-ICA ====
October 17

La Salle Green Hills Greenies	88–74	EAC–ICA Brigadiers
La Salle advances to the stepladder semifinals round 2

Filoil Flying V Arena, San Juan

==== (2) Letran vs. (3) LSGH ====
Studio 23

October 19

Letran Squires	91–101	La Salle Green Hills Greenies
La Salle advances to the Finals

Filoil Flying V Arena, San Juan

=== Finals ===
San Beda has to win twice, while LSGH has to win thrice, to win the championship series.

Studio 23

October 24

San Beda Red Cubs	82–85	La Salle Green Hills Greenies
Scoring by quarter: 10-20, 28-21, 24-22, 20-22
Pts: Limuel Patenio 19; Rebs: Von Abatayo 6 Asts: Von Abatayo 3		Pts: Jon Villaruz 22; Rebs: Andre Paras 7 Asts: Andre Paras 3

Smart Araneta Coliseum, Quezon City

October 31

San Beda Red Cubs	74–73	La Salle Green Hills Greenies
Scoring by quarter: 18-19, 15-19, 28-20, 13-15
Pts: Francis Abarcar 21; Rebs: Arvin Tolentino 12; Asts: Arvin Tolentino 6		Pts: Jon Villaruz 20; Rebs: Andre Paras 8 Asts: Andre Paras 2

Filoil Flying V Arena, San Juan

Studio 23

November 2

San Beda Red Cubs	69–61	La Salle Green Hills Greenies
Scoring by quarter: 17-13, 12-13, 22-14, 18-21
Pts: Francis Abarcar 18; Rebs: Francis Abarcar 8 Asts: Francis Abarcar 3		Pts: Thomas Torres 25; Rebs: Thomas Torres 8 Asts: Thomas Torres 5
San Beda wins series in three games

Filoil Flying V Arena, San Juan

- Finals Most Valuable Player: Francis Abarcar (San Beda Red Cubs)
- Coach of the Year: Britt Reroma (San Beda Red Cubs)

=== Awards ===
NCAA Season 87 juniors' basketball champions
San Beda Red Cubs
18th title, third consecutive title

The winners are:

- Most Valuable Player: Rey Nambatac (Letran Squires)
- Rookie of the Year: Lugie Cuyos (EAC–ICA Brigadiers)
- Mythical Five:
  - Rey Nambatac (Letran Squires)
  - Sidney Onwubere (EAC–ICA Brigadiers)
  - Ivan Villanueva (Letran Squires)
  - Aldrin Serafica (Letran Squires)
  - Von Abatayo (San Beda Red Cubs)
- Most Improved Player: Francis Abarcar (San Beda Red Cubs)
- Defensive Player of the Year: Sidney Onwubere (EAC–ICA Brigadiers)

== See also ==
- UAAP Season 74 basketball tournaments

Preceded by Season 86 (2010)	NCAA basketball seasons Season 87 (2011)	Succeeded by Season 88 (2012)
