= NCAA Season 88 basketball tournaments =

Basketball season

NCAA Season 88
- Host school: Colegio de San Juan de Letran
Men's Finals	G1	G2	G3	Wins
San Beda Red Lions	62	55	67	2
Letran Knights	60	64	39	1
- Duration: October 18–26, 2012
- Arena(s): Mall of Asia Arena; Smart Araneta Coliseum
- Finals MVP: Baser Amer
- Winning coach: Ronnie Magsanoc (1st title)
- Semifinalists: San Sebastian Stags; Perpetual Altas
- TV network(s): AKTV, TV5
Juniors' Finals	G1	G2	Wins
San Beda Red Cubs	69	83	2
San Sebastian Staglets	51	58	0
- Duration: October 18–20, 2012
- Arena(s): Mall of Asia Arena; Smart Araneta Coliseum
- Finals MVP: Javee Mocon
- Winning coach: Brit Reroma (3rd title)
- Semifinalists: La Salle Green Hills Greenies; Letran Squires
- TV network(s): AKTV

The basketball tournaments of NCAA Season 88 are the Philippines' National Collegiate Athletic Association tournaments for basketball in its 2012–13 season. Colegio de San Juan de Letran hosted the season, starting with an opening ceremony held on June 23, 2012 followed by a double-header. Games then are subsequently being held at Filoil Flying V Arena, with men's games on Mondays, Thursdays and Saturdays aired by AKTV.

== Men's tournament ==
=== Teams ===
Team	College	Coach
Arellano Chiefs	Arellano University (AU)	(Philippines) Koy Banal
Letran Knights	Colegio de San Juan de Letran (CSJL)	(Philippines) Louie Alas
Benilde Blazers	De La Salle–College of Saint Benilde (CSB)	(Philippines) Richard del Rosario
EAC Generals	Emilio Aguinaldo College (EAC)	(Philippines) Gerry Esplana
JRU Heavy Bombers	José Rizal University (JRU)	(Philippines) Vergel Meneses
Lyceum Pirates	Lyceum of the Philippines University (LPU)	(Philippines) Bonnie Tan
Mapúa Cardinals	Mapúa Institute of Technology (MIT)	(Philippines) Chito Victolero
San Beda Red Lions	San Beda College (SBC)	(Philippines) Ronnie Magsanoc
San Sebastian Stags	San Sebastian College – Recoletos (SSC-R)	(Philippines) Allan Trinidad
Perpetual Altas	University of Perpetual Help System DALTA (UPHSD)	(Philippines) Aric del Rosario

==== Changes from last season ====
Probationary member (from guest team):

- Lyceum Pirates

==== Coaching changes ====
Coaching changes (Men's Basketball)
Team	Old coach	Reason	New coach
San Beda	(Philippines) Frankie Lim	Resigned	(Philippines) Ronnie Magsanoc
Perpetual	(Philippines) Jimwell Gican	Resigned	(Philippines) Aric del Rosario
Arellano	(Philippines) Leo Isaac	Resigned	(Philippines) Koy Banal
San Sebastian	(Philippines) Topex Robinson	Resigned	(Philippines) Allan Trinidad

=== Elimination round ===
==== Team standings ====
Pos	Team	W	L	PCT	GB	Qualification
1	San Beda Red Lions	15	3	.833	—	Twice-to-beat in the semifinals
2	San Sebastian Stags	13	5	.722	2	Twice-to-beat in the semifinals
3	Letran Knights (H)	12	6	.667	3	Twice-to-win in the semifinals
4	Perpetual Altas	10	8	.556 (Note: Fourth-seed playoff: Perpetual 73–68 JRU)	5	Twice-to-win in the semifinals
5	JRU Heavy Bombers	10	8	.556	5	
6	Mapúa Cardinals	8	10	.444 (Note: Head-to-head record: Mapúa 2–0 EAC)	7	
7	EAC Generals (X)	8	10	.444	7	
8	Arellano Chiefs (X)	6	12	.333	9	
9	Benilde Blazers	5	13	.278	10	
10	Lyceum Pirates (X)	3	15	.167	12	

Source: ABS-CBN Sports
Rules for classification: 1) winning percentage; 2) if tied for top 4, one-game playoff; 3) head-to-head record; 4) overall point differential
(H) Hosts; (X) Under probation

==== Match-up results ====
	Round 1									Round 2								
Team ╲ Game	1	2	3	4	5	6	7	8	9	10	11	12	13	14	15	16	17	18
Arellano	San Beda school colors	EAC school colors	JRU school colors	Letran school colors	Lyceum school colors	CSB school colors	SSC-R school colors	UPHD school colors	Mapua school colors	JRU school colors	EAC school colors	SSC-R school colors	Mapua school colors	UPHD school colors	San Beda school colors	Lyceum school colors	CSB school colors	Letran school colors
Letran	SSC-R school colors	UPHD school colors	Arellano school colors	CSB school colors	Mapua school colors	EAC school colors	Lyceum school colors	JRU school colors	San Beda school colors	Mapua school colors	UPHD school colors	San Beda school colors	Lyceum school colors	CSB school colors	SSC-R school colors	JRU school colors	EAC school colors	Arellano school colors
Benilde	Lyceum school colors	SSC-R school colors	Mapua school colors	Letran school colors	San Beda school colors	UPHD school colors	Arellano school colors	JRU school colors	EAC school colors	UPHD school colors	San Beda school colors	Lyceum school colors	SSC-R school colors	Letran school colors	JRU school colors	EAC school colors	Arellano school colors	Mapua school colors
EAC	Arellano school colors	JRU school colors	Lyceum school colors	Mapua school colors	San Beda school colors	Letran school colors	UPHD school colors	SSC-R school colors	CSB school colors	SSC-R school colors	Arellano school colors	Mapua school colors	UPHD school colors	San Beda school colors	Lyceum school colors	CSB school colors	Letran school colors	JRU school colors
JRU	Mapua school colors	Arellano school colors	EAC school colors	SSC-R school colors	UPHD school colors	Lyceum school colors	CSB school colors	San Beda school colors	Letran school colors	Arellano school colors	Mapua school colors	UPHD school colors	San Beda school colors	Lyceum school colors	CSB school colors	Letran school colors	SSC-R school colors	EAC school colors
Lyceum	CSB school colors	UPHD school colors	San Beda school colors	EAC school colors	Mapua school colors	Arellano school colors	SSC-R school colors	JRU school colors	Letran school colors	San Beda school colors	SSC-R school colors	CSB school colors	Letran school colors	JRU school colors	EAC school colors	UPHD school colors	Arellano school colors	Mapua school colors
Mapúa	JRU school colors	CSB school colors	EAC school colors	Lyceum school colors	Letran school colors	UPHD school colors	San Beda school colors	SSC-R school colors	Arellano school colors	Letran school colors	JRU school colors	EAC school colors	Arellano school colors	SSC-R school colors	UPHD school colors	San Beda school colors	Lyceum school colors	CSB school colors
San Beda	Arellano school colors	Lyceum school colors	UPHD school colors	CSB school colors	EAC school colors	Mapua school colors	JRU school colors	SSC-R school colors	Letran school colors	Lyceum school colors	CSB school colors	Letran school colors	JRU school colors	EAC school colors	Arellano school colors	Mapua school colors	UPHD school colors	SSC-R school colors
San Sebastian	Letran school colors	CSB school colors	UPHD school colors	JRU school colors	Lyceum school colors	Arellano school colors	EAC school colors	Mapua school colors	San Beda school colors	EAC school colors	Lyceum school colors	Arellano school colors	CSB school colors	Mapua school colors	Letran school colors	JRU school colors	UPHD school colors	San Beda school colors
Perpetual	Lyceum school colors	Letran school colors	SSC-R school colors	San Beda school colors	CSB school colors	JRU school colors	Mapua school colors	EAC school colors	Arellano school colors	CSB school colors	Letran school colors	JRU school colors	EAC school colors	Arellano school colors	Mapua school colors	Lyceum school colors	San Beda school colors	SSC-R school colors

= Win; = OT win; = Loss; = OT loss

==== Scores ====
Team	AU	CSJL	CSB	EAC	JRU	LPU	MIT	SBC	SSC-R	UPHSD
Arellano Chiefs		77–67	73–80*	72–75	65–77	83–52	49–68	71–81	70–91	63–54
Letran Squires	76–58		60–77	65–62	83–101	70–60	66–60	43–65	80–74	66–69
Benilde Blazers	74–69	83–97		61–76	72–77	70–61	55–64	53–59	93–95	64–84
EAC Generals	76–57	80–86	73–64		79–90	81–83	63–67	65–81	93–94	71–72
JRU Heavy Bombers	82–85	59–70	62–56	65–71		85–71	65–64	37–62	78–101	64–59
Lyceum Pirates	49–58	60–76	73–87	73–94	69–62*		78–74	67–82	79–87	70–82
Mapúa Cardinals	57–59	60–72	80–66	80–55	60–63	76–58		52–64	61–54	88–94*
San Beda Red Lions	82–75	68–62	74–56	92–69	67–45	77–47	65–41		71–80	87–88*
San Sebastian Stags	79–71	67–82	92–72	67–77	74–82	83–75	77–62	69–55		80–65
Perpetual Altas	89–58	57–62	78–74	71–73	88–72	64–53	71–74	53–60	62–80	

Legend: Blue = left column team win; Red = top row team win.
Matches with lighter background shading were decided after overtime.

=== Fourth seed playoff ===
AKTV

October 11
6:00 p.m.

Perpetual Altas	73–68	JRU Heavy Bombers
Scoring by quarter: 22–19, 19–16, 12–15, 20–18

Filoil Flying V Arena, San Juan

=== Bracket ===
Semifinals (Top 2 twice-to-beat)
1	San Beda	56
4	Perpetual	52
2	San Sebastian	74	70
3	Letran	92	73

Finals (Best-of-three playoff)
1	San Beda	62	55	67
3	Letran	60	64	39

=== Semifinals ===
In the semifinals, the higher seed has the twice-to-beat advantage, where they only have to win once, while their opponents twice, to progress.

==== (1) San Beda vs. (4) Perpetual ====
AKTV

October 13
4:00 p.m.

San Beda Red Lions	56–52	Perpetual Altas
Scoring by quarter: 9–10, 8–12, 18–17, 21–13
San Beda wins series in one game

Smart Araneta Coliseum, Quezon City

==== (2) San Sebastian vs. (3) Letran ====
AKTV

October 13
6:00 p.m.

San Sebastian Stags	74–92	Letran Knights
Scoring by quarter: 7–27, 21–19, 20–23, 26–23

Smart Araneta Coliseum, Quezon City

AKTV

October 15
6:00 p.m.

San Sebastian Stags	70–73	Letran Knights
Scoring by quarter: 22–25, 22–15, 12–14, 14–19
Letran wins series in two games

Filoil Flying V Arena, San Juan

=== Finals ===
AKTV

October 18
6:00 p.m.

San Beda Red Lions	62–60	Letran Knights
Scoring by quarter: 18–12, 6–13, 23–16, 15–19

Mall of Asia Arena, Pasay

AKTV

October 20
6:00 p.m.

San Beda Red Lions	55–64	Letran Knights
Scoring by quarter: 14–18, 14–19, 15–4, 12–23

Smart Araneta Coliseum, Quezon City
Attendance: 15,534

TV5

October 26
1:00 p.m.

San Beda Red Lions	67–39	Letran Knights
Scoring by quarter: 18–10, 16–7, 11–8, 22–14
San Beda wins series, 2–1

Smart Araneta Coliseum, Quezon City
Attendance: 18,187

- Finals Most Valuable Player: Baser Amer (San Beda Red Lions)

=== Awards ===
NCAA Season 88 men's basketball champions
San Beda Red Lions
17th title, third consecutive title

The following were awarded as the best players this season:

- Most Valuable Player: Ian Sangalang (San Sebastian Stags)
- Rookie of the Year: Cedric Noube Happi (EAC Generals)
- Defensive Player of the Year: Raymond Almazan (Letran Knights)
- Most Improved Player: Scottie Thompson (Perpetual Altas)
- Mythical Five:
  - Kevin Alas (Letran Knights)
  - Jake Pascual (San Beda Red Lions)
  - Ian Sangalang (San Sebastian Stags)
  - Cedric Noube Happi (EAC Generals)
  - Scottie Thompson (Perpetual Altas)

== Juniors' tournament ==
=== Elimination round ===
==== Team standings ====
Pos	Team	W	L	PCT	GB	Qualification
1	San Beda Red Cubs	17	1	.944	—	Twice-to-beat in the semifinals
2	San Sebastian Staglets	16	2	.889	1	Twice-to-beat in the semifinals
3	La Salle Green Hills Greenies	13	5	.722 (Note: Third-seed playoff: LSGH 75–70 Letran)	4	Twice-to-win in the semifinals
4	Letran Squires (H)	13	5	.722	4	Twice-to-win in the semifinals
5	Mapúa Red Robins	11	7	.611	6	
6	Arellano Braves (X)	7	11	.389 (Note: Head-to-head record: Arellano 1–1 JRU (Arellano +18))	10	
7	JRU Light Bombers	7	11	.389	10	
8	Perpetual Junior Altas	4	14	.222	13	
9	EAC–ICA Brigadiers (X)	2	16	.111	15	
10	Lyceum Junior Pirates (X)	0	18	.000	17	

Source: ABS-CBN Sports
Rules for classification: 1) winning percentage; 2) if tied for top 4, one-game playoff; 3) head-to-head record; 4) overall point differential
(H) Hosts; (X) Under probation

==== Match-up results ====
	Round 1									Round 2								
Team ╲ Game	1	2	3	4	5	6	7	8	9	10	11	12	13	14	15	16	17	18
AU	San Beda school colors	EAC school colors	JRU school colors	Lyceum school colors	SSC-R school colors	Letran school colors	UPHD school colors	CSB school colors	Mapua school colors	JRU school colors	EAC school colors	SSC-R school colors	Mapua school colors	UPHD school colors	San Beda school colors	Lyceum school colors	CSB school colors	Letran school colors
CSJL	SSC-R school colors	CSB school colors	EAC school colors	Mapua school colors	Arellano school colors	Lyceum school colors	UPHD school colors	JRU school colors	San Beda school colors	San Beda school colors	Lyceum school colors	CSB school colors	SSC-R school colors	JRU school colors	EAC school colors	UPHD school colors	Arellano school colors	Mapua school colors
LSGH	Lyceum school colors	SSC-R school colors	Mapua school colors	Letran school colors	San Beda school colors	UPHD school colors	JRU school colors	Arellano school colors	EAC school colors	UPHD school colors	Lyceum school colors	SSC-R school colors	Letran school colors	JRU school colors	EAC school colors	Arellano school colors	San Beda school colors	Mapua school colors
EAC–ICA	Arellano school colors	JRU school colors	Lyceum school colors	Mapua school colors	Letran school colors	San Beda school colors	UPHD school colors	SSC-R school colors	CSB school colors	SSC-R school colors	Arellano school colors	Mapua school colors	UPHD school colors	San Beda school colors	Lyceum school colors	CSB school colors	Letran school colors	JRU school colors
JRU	Mapua school colors	Arellano school colors	EAC school colors	SSC-R school colors	UPHD school colors	Lyceum school colors	CSB school colors	San Beda school colors	Letran school colors	Arellano school colors	Mapua school colors	UPHD school colors	San Beda school colors	Lyceum school colors	CSB school colors	Letran school colors	SSC-R school colors	EAC school colors
LPU	CSB school colors	UPHD school colors	San Beda school colors	EAC school colors	Mapua school colors	Arellano school colors	SSC-R school colors	JRU school colors	Letran school colors	San Beda school colors	SSC-R school colors	CSB school colors	Letran school colors	JRU school colors	EAC school colors	UPHD school colors	Arellano school colors	Mapua school colors
MHSS	JRU school colors	CSB school colors	EAC school colors	Lyceum school colors	Letran school colors	UPHD school colors	San Beda school colors	SSC-R school colors	Arellano school colors	JRU school colors	EAC school colors	Arellano school colors	SSC-R school colors	San Beda school colors	UPHD school colors	Lyceum school colors	CSB school colors	Letran school colors
SBC–R	Arellano school colors	Lyceum school colors	UPHD school colors	CSB school colors	EAC school colors	Mapua school colors	JRU school colors	SSC-R school colors	Letran school colors	Lyceum school colors	Letran school colors	JRU school colors	EAC school colors	Arellano school colors	Mapua school colors	UPHD school colors	CSB school colors	SSC-R school colors
SSC–R	Letran school colors	CSB school colors	UPHD school colors	JRU school colors	Lyceum school colors	Arellano school colors	Mapua school colors	EAC school colors	San Beda school colors	EAC school colors	Lyceum school colors	Arellano school colors	CSB school colors	Mapua school colors	Letran school colors	JRU school colors	UPHD school colors	San Beda school colors
UPHSD	Lyceum school colors	SSC-R school colors	San Beda school colors	CSB school colors	JRU school colors	Mapua school colors	EAC school colors	Letran school colors	Arellano school colors	CSB school colors	JRU school colors	EAC school colors	Arellano school colors	Mapua school colors	Lyceum school colors	San Beda school colors	Letran school colors	SSC-R school colors

= Win; = OT win; = Loss; = OT loss

==== Scores ====
Team	AU	CSJL	LSGH	EAC-ICA	JRU	LPU	MHSS	SBC-R	SSC-R	UPHSD
Arellano Braves		53–100	59–85	104–49	82–59	130–28	68–73	70–104	65–78	72–65
Letran Squires	79–49		77–71	82–63	93–59	124–27	85–76	69–86	85–87	90–85
La Salle Green Hills Greenies	91–72	79–62		114–70	72–65	122–41	69–49	60–65	66–74	100–63
EAC-ICA Brigadiers	62–104	53–61	38–96		57–85	119–54	50–101	51–144	52–95	100–102*
JRU Light Bombers	53–48	53–67	54–74	76–53		113–31	59–65	54–84	40–66	89–87
Lyceum Junior Pirates	36–125	29–110	22–101	55–85	36–80		32–132	14–171	15–136	57–135
Malayan Red Robins	79–69	61–79	67–78	104–66	67–47	124–37		59–84	54–67	95–58
San Beda Red Cubs	84–41	73–64	65–52	111–51	86–66	171–22	60–64		77–68*	108–57
San Sebastian Staglets	91–48	75–51	62–51	96–50	79–70	99–30	75–60	61–66		98–94
Perpetual Altalettes	64–69	61–77	76–95	112–48	70–74	107–47	53–69	61–96	44–71	

Legend: Blue = left column team win; Red = top row team win.
Matches with lighter background shading were decided after overtime.

=== Third seed playoff ===
AKTV

October 11
4:00 p.m.

La Salle Green Hills Greenies	75–70	Letran Squires
Scoring by quarter: 15–19, 19–15, 20–20, 21–16

Filoil Flying V Arena, San Juan

=== Bracket ===
Semifinals (Top 2 twice-to-beat)
1	San Beda	61
4	Letran	57
2	San Sebastian	58
3	LSGH	55

Finals (Best-of-three playoff)
1	San Beda	69	83
2	San Sebastian	51	58

=== Semifinals ===
In the semifinals, the higher seed has the twice-to-beat advantage, where they only have to win once, while their opponents twice, to progress.

==== (1) San Beda vs. (4) Letran ====
October 13
12:00 p.m.

San Beda Red Cubs	61–58	Letran Squires
San Beda wins series in one game

Smart Araneta Coliseum, Quezon City

==== (2) San Sebastian vs. (3) LSGH ====
October 13
2:00 p.m.

San Sebastian Staglets	58–55	La Salle Green Hills Greenies
San Sebastian wins series in one game

Smart Araneta Coliseum, Quezon City

=== Finals ===
AKTV

October 18
4:00 p.m.

San Beda Red Cubs	69–51	San Sebastian Staglets
Scoring by quarter: 15–15, 17–15, 16–8, 21–13

Mall of Asia Arena, Pasay

AKTV

October 20
3:15 p.m.

San Beda Red Cubs	83–58	San Sebastian Staglets
Scoring by quarter: 16–12, 16–13, 24–16, 27–17
San Beda wins series, 2–0

Smart Araneta Coliseum, Quezon City

- Finals Most Valuable Player: Javee Mocon (San Beda Red Cubs)

=== Awards ===
NCAA Season 88 juniors' basketball champions
San Beda Red Cubs
19th title, fourth consecutive title

- Most Valuable Player: Bong Quinto (Letran Squires)
- Rookie of the Year: Bong Quinto (Letran Squires)
- Mythical Five:
  - Bong Quinto (Letran Squires)
  - Rey Nambatac (Letran Squires)
  - Javee Mocon (San Beda Red Cubs)
  - Arvin Tolentino (San Beda Red Cubs)
  - Enjerico Diego (Mapúa Red Robins)
- Most Improved Player: Justin Serrano (Mapúa Red Robins)
- Defensive Player of the Year: Enjerico Diego (Mapúa Red Robins)

== See also ==
- UAAP Season 75 basketball tournaments

Preceded by Season 87 (2011)	NCAA basketball seasons Season 88 (2012)	Succeeded by Season 89 (2013)
