= NCAA Season 89 basketball tournaments =

Basketball season

NCAA Season 89
- Host school: De La Salle–College of Saint Benilde
Men's Finals	G1	G2	G3	Wins
San Beda Red Lions	80	74	60	2
Letran Knights	68	79	56	1
- Duration: November 11–16, 2013
- Arena(s): Mall of Asia Arena
- Finals MVP: Arthur dela Cruz
- Winning coach: Boyet Fernandez (1st title)
- Semifinalists: San Sebastian Stags; Perpetual Altas
- TV network(s): AksyonTV, TV5
Juniors' Finals	G1	G2	Wins
San Beda Red Cubs	79	65	2+1
La Salle Green Hills Greenies	68	59	0
- Duration: November 11–14, 2013
- Arena(s): Mall of Asia Arena
- Finals MVP: Arvin Tolentino
- Winning coach: JB Sison (1st title)
- Semifinalists: San Sebastian Staglets; Mapúa Red Robins
- TV network(s): AksyonTV, TV5

The basketball tournaments of NCAA Season 89 are the Philippines' National Collegiate Athletic Association tournaments for basketball in its 2013–14 season. De La Salle-College of Saint Benilde hosted the season, starting with an opening ceremony held on June 22, 2013, at the Mall of Asia Arena followed by a double-header. Games then are subsequently being held at Filoil Flying V Arena, with men's games on Mondays, Thursdays and Saturdays aired on AksyonTV.

== Men's tournament ==
=== Teams ===
Team	College	Coach
Arellano Chiefs	Arellano University (AU)	(Philippines) Koy Banal
Letran Knights	Colegio de San Juan de Letran (CSJL)	(Philippines) Caloy Garcia
Benilde Blazers	De La Salle–College of Saint Benilde (CSB)	(Philippines) Gabby Velasco
EAC Generals	Emilio Aguinaldo College (EAC)	(Philippines) Gerry Esplana
JRU Heavy Bombers	José Rizal University (JRU)	(Philippines) Vergel Meneses
Lyceum Pirates	Lyceum of the Philippines University (LPU)	(Philippines) Bonnie Tan
Mapúa Cardinals	Mapúa Institute of Technology (MIT)	(Philippines) Atoy Co
San Beda Red Lions	San Beda College (SBC)	(Philippines) Boyet Fernandez
San Sebastian Stags	San Sebastian College – Recoletos (SSC-R)	(Philippines) Topex Robinson
Perpetual Altas	University of Perpetual Help System DALTA (UPHSD)	(Philippines) Aric del Rosario

=== Elimination round ===
==== Team standings ====
Pos	Team	W	L	PCT	GB	Qualification
1	San Beda Red Lions	15	3	.833	—	Twice-to-beat in the semifinals
2	Letran Knights	14	4	.778	1	Twice-to-beat in the semifinals
3	San Sebastian Stags	11	7	.611 (Note: Third-seed playoff: San Sebastian 81–71 UPHSD)	4	Twice-to-win in the semifinals
4	Perpetual Altas	11	7	.611	4	Twice-to-win in the semifinals
5	EAC Generals (X)	10	8	.556	5	
6	Arellano Chiefs (X)	8	10	.444 (Note: Head-to-head record: Arellano 2–0 Lyceum)	7	
7	Lyceum Pirates (X)	8	10	.444	7	
8	JRU Heavy Bombers	6	12	.333	9	
9	Benilde Blazers (H)	5	13	.278	10	
10	Mapúa Cardinals	2	16	.111	13	

Source: ABS-CBN Sports
Rules for classification: 1) winning percentage; 2) if tied for top 4 seeds, one-game playoff; 3) head-to-head record; 4) overall point differential
(H) Hosts; (X) Under probation

==== Match-up results ====
	Round 1									Round 2								
Team ╲ Game	1	2	3	4	5	6	7	8	9	10	11	12	13	14	15	16	17	18
Arellano	SSC-R school colors	Lyceum school colors	San Beda school colors	Mapua school colors	UPHD school colors	Letran school colors	CSB school colors	EAC school colors	JRU school colors	UPHD school colors	SSC-R school colors	Lyceum school colors	Letran school colors	Mapua school colors	EAC school colors	CSB school colors	JRU school colors	San Beda school colors
Letran	SSC-R school colors	EAC school colors	JRU school colors	CSB school colors	Lyceum school colors	Arellano school colors	Mapua school colors	UPHD school colors	San Beda school colors	Mapua school colors	Lyceum school colors	Arellano school colors	EAC school colors	JRU school colors	CSB school colors	UPHD school colors	SSC-R school colors	San Beda school colors
Benilde	San Beda school colors	EAC school colors	JRU school colors	Letran school colors	SSC-R school colors	Lyceum school colors	Arellano school colors	Mapua school colors	UPHD school colors	JRU school colors	Mapua school colors	UPHD school colors	San Beda school colors	EAC school colors	Letran school colors	Arellano school colors	Lyceum school colors	SSC-R school colors
EAC	UPHD school colors	Letran school colors	CSB school colors	San Beda school colors	JRU school colors	SSC-R school colors	Lyceum school colors	Arellano school colors	Mapua school colors	SSC-R school colors	UPHD school colors	San Beda school colors	Letran school colors	Lyceum school colors	CSB school colors	Arellano school colors	JRU school colors	Mapua school colors
JRU	Mapua school colors	UPHD school colors	Letran school colors	CSB school colors	EAC school colors	San Beda school colors	SSC-R school colors	Arellano school colors	Lyceum school colors	CSB school colors	San Beda school colors	UPHD school colors	Letran school colors	Mapua school colors	SSC-R school colors	Lyceum school colors	EAC school colors	Arellano school colors
Lyceum	San Beda school colors	Arellano school colors	Mapua school colors	UPHD school colors	Letran school colors	CSB school colors	EAC school colors	JRU school colors	SSC-R school colors	San Beda school colors	Letran school colors	Arellano school colors	SSC-R school colors	EAC school colors	UPHD school colors	JRU school colors	Mapua school colors	CSB school colors
Mapúa	JRU school colors	SSC-R school colors	Lyceum school colors	Arellano school colors	San Beda school colors	UPHD school colors	Letran school colors	CSB school colors	EAC school colors	Letran school colors	CSB school colors	SSC-R school colors	UPHD school colors	Arellano school colors	JRU school colors	San Beda school colors	Lyceum school colors	EAC school colors
San Beda	CSB school colors	Lyceum school colors	Arellano school colors	EAC school colors	Mapua school colors	JRU school colors	UPHD school colors	SSC-R school colors	Letran school colors	Lyceum school colors	JRU school colors	EAC school colors	CSB school colors	UPHD school colors	SSC-R school colors	Mapua school colors	Letran school colors	Arellano school colors
San Sebastian	Letran school colors	Arellano school colors	Mapua school colors	UPHD school colors	CSB school colors	EAC school colors	JRU school colors	San Beda school colors	Lyceum school colors	EAC school colors	Arellano school colors	Mapua school colors	Lyceum school colors	San Beda school colors	JRU school colors	Letran school colors	UPHD school colors	CSB school colors
Perpetual	EAC school colors	JRU school colors	SSC-R school colors	Lyceum school colors	Arellano school colors	Mapua school colors	San Beda school colors	Letran school colors	CSB school colors	Arellano school colors	EAC school colors	CSB school colors	JRU school colors	Mapua school colors	San Beda school colors	Lyceum school colors	Letran school colors	SSC-R school colors

= Win; = OT win; = Loss; = OT loss

==== Scores ====
Team	AU	CSJL	CSB	EAC	JRU	LPU	MIT	SBC	SSC-R	UPHSD
Arellano Chiefs		57–67	62–69	63–79	67–64	68–60	65–59	54–67	76–78	66–73
Letran Knights	70–59		61–60	79–74	69–66*	61–53	87–68	74–67	74–69	66–80
Benilde Blazers	70–76	89–95*		72–73	71–73*	74–69	84–64	70–71	78–80	89–90*
EAC Generals	70–71	87–64	85–83		79–85	83–76	89–80	65–80	74–81	49–69
JRU Heavy Bombers	54–63	50–75	55–57	68–78		72–73	83–72	41–65	67–63	70–78
Lyceum Pirates	75–76	80–76	66–54	63–71	73–72		78–69	70–66	60–55	84–61
Mapúa Cardinals	75–115	70–77	62–74	76–82	56–73	69–78		53–78	104–99**	68–73
San Beda Red Lions	78–62	76–72*	65–46	71–64	68–54	81–63	76–81		83–64	72–65
San Sebastian Stags	49–54	68–75	69–62	90–69	71–62	58–53	72–63	68–72		78–77*
Perpetual Altas	82–80	61–74	68–89	68–70	64–61	61–84	73–65	76–78*	65–71	

Legend: Blue = left column team win; Red = top row team win.
Matches with lighter background shading were decided after overtime.

=== Third seed playoff ===
Winner faces Letran, while loser faces San Beda, in the semifinals. Either way, both teams have to win twice in the semifinals to progress.

AksyonTV

October 29
4:00 p.m.

San Sebastian Stags	81–71	Perpetual Altas

Filoil Flying V Arena, San Juan

=== Bracket ===
Semifinals (Top 2 twice-to-beat)
1	San Beda	70
4	Perpetual	51
2	Letran	85
3	San Sebastian	58

Finals (Best-of-three playoff)
1	San Beda	80	74	60
2	Letran	68	79	56

=== Semifinals ===
Letran and San Beda have the twice-to-beat advantage; they only have to win once, while their opponents twice, to advance to the Finals.

==== (1) San Beda vs. (4) Perpetual ====
AksyonTV

November 7
2:30 p.m.

San Beda Red Lions	70–51	Perpetual Altas
Scoring by quarter: 11-9, 10-24, 17-12, 32-14
San Beda wins series in one game

Mall of Asia Arena, Pasay

==== (2) Letran vs. (3) San Sebastian ====
AksyonTV

November 7
12:30 p.m.

Letran Knights	85–58	San Sebastian Stags
Letran wins series in one game

Mall of Asia Arena, Pasay

=== Finals ===
The finals is a best-of-3 series.

TV5

November 11
2:30 p.m.

San Beda Red Lions	80–68	Letran Knights
Scoring by quarter: 12-12, 14-12, 21-29, 33-15

Mall of Asia Arena, Pasay

TV5

November 14
2:30 p.m.

San Beda Red Lions	74–79	Letran Knights
Scoring by quarter: 12-17, 25-15, 14-21, 23-25

Mall of Asia Arena, Pasay

TV5

November 16
2:00 p.m.

San Beda Red Lions	60–56	Letran Knights
Scoring by quarter: 14-7, 10-23, 21-13, 15-13
San Beda wins series 2–1

Mall of Asia Arena, Pasay

- Finals Most Valuable Player: Arthur dela Cruz (San Beda Red Lions)

=== Awards ===
NCAA Season 89 men's basketball champions
San Beda Red Lions
18th title, fourth consecutive title

The winners were:

- Most Valuable Player: Raymond Almazan (Letran Knights)
- Mythical Five:
  - Raymond Almazan (Letran Knights)
  - Ola Adeogun (San Beda Red Lions)
  - Harold Arboleda (Perpetual Altas)
  - Nosa Omorgbe (Perpetual Altas)
  - Noube Happy (EAC Generals)
- Defensive Player of the Year: Raymond Almazan (Letran Knights)
- Rookie of the Year: Juneric Baloria (Perpetual Altas)
- Most Improved Player: Michael Mabulac (JRU Heavy Bombers)

== Juniors' tournament ==
=== Elimination round ===
==== Team standings ====
Pos	Team	W	L	PCT	GB	Qualification
1	San Beda Red Cubs	18	0	1.000	—	Thrice-to-beat in the Finals (Note: As San Beda won all of their elimination round games, the stepladder format will be used instead of the regular Final Four format.)
2	San Sebastian Staglets	15	3	.833	3	Proceed to stepladder round 2
3	La Salle Green Hills Greenies (H)	13	5	.722	5	Proceed to stepladder round 1
4	Mapúa Red Robins	12	6	.667	6	Proceed to stepladder round 1
5	JRU Light Bombers	11	7	.611	7	
6	Letran Squires	8	10	.444	10	
7	Perpetual Junior Altas	7	11	.389	11	
8	EAC–ICA Brigadiers (X)	3	15	.167 (Note: Head-to-head record: EAC 1–1 Arellano; EAC +4)	15	
9	Arellano Braves (X)	3	15	.167	15	
10	Lyceum Junior Pirates (X)	0	18	.000	18	

Source: ABS-CBN Sports
Rules for classification: 1) winning percentage; 2) if tied for top 4 seeds, one-game playoff; 3) head-to-head record; 4) overall point differential
(H) Hosts; (X) Under probation

==== Match-up results ====
	Round 1									Round 2								
Team ╲ Game	1	2	3	4	5	6	7	8	9	10	11	12	13	14	15	16	17	18
AU	SSC-R school colors	Lyceum school colors	San Beda school colors	Mapua school colors	UPHD school colors	Letran school colors	CSB school colors	EAC school colors	JRU school colors	UPHD school colors	SSC-R school colors	Lyceum school colors	Letran school colors	Mapua school colors	EAC school colors	CSB school colors	JRU school colors	San Beda school colors
CSJL	SSC-R school colors	EAC school colors	JRU school colors	CSB school colors	Lyceum school colors	Arellano school colors	Mapua school colors	UPHD school colors	San Beda school colors	Mapua school colors	Lyceum school colors	Arellano school colors	EAC school colors	JRU school colors	CSB school colors	UPHD school colors	SSC-R school colors	San Beda school colors
EAC–ICA	UPHD school colors	Letran school colors	CSB school colors	San Beda school colors	JRU school colors	SSC-R school colors	Lyceum school colors	Arellano school colors	Mapua school colors	SSC-R school colors	UPHD school colors	San Beda school colors	Letran school colors	Lyceum school colors	CSB school colors	Arellano school colors	JRU school colors	Mapua school colors
JRU	Mapua school colors	UPHD school colors	Letran school colors	CSB school colors	EAC school colors	San Beda school colors	SSC-R school colors	Lyceum school colors	Arellano school colors	CSB school colors	San Beda school colors	UPHD school colors	Letran school colors	Mapua school colors	SSC-R school colors	Lyceum school colors	EAC school colors	Arellano school colors
LSGH	San Beda school colors	EAC school colors	JRU school colors	Letran school colors	SSC-R school colors	Lyceum school colors	Arellano school colors	Mapua school colors	UPHD school colors	JRU school colors	Mapua school colors	UPHD school colors	San Beda school colors	EAC school colors	Letran school colors	Lyceum school colors	Arellano school colors	SSC-R school colors
LPU	San Beda school colors	Arellano school colors	Mapua school colors	UPHD school colors	Letran school colors	CSB school colors	EAC school colors	JRU school colors	SSC-R school colors	San Beda school colors	Letran school colors	Arellano school colors	SSC-R school colors	EAC school colors	UPHD school colors	CSB school colors	JRU school colors	Mapua school colors
MHSS	JRU school colors	SSC-R school colors	Lyceum school colors	Arellano school colors	San Beda school colors	UPHD school colors	Letran school colors	CSB school colors	EAC school colors	Letran school colors	CSB school colors	SSC-R school colors	UPHD school colors	Arellano school colors	JRU school colors	San Beda school colors	Lyceum school colors	EAC school colors
SBC–R	Lyceum school colors	CSB school colors	Arellano school colors	EAC school colors	Mapua school colors	JRU school colors	UPHD school colors	SSC-R school colors	Letran school colors	Lyceum school colors	JRU school colors	EAC school colors	CSB school colors	UPHD school colors	SSC-R school colors	Mapua school colors	Letran school colors	Arellano school colors
SSC–R	Letran school colors	Arellano school colors	Mapua school colors	UPHD school colors	CSB school colors	EAC school colors	JRU school colors	San Beda school colors	Lyceum school colors	EAC school colors	Arellano school colors	Mapua school colors	Lyceum school colors	San Beda school colors	JRU school colors	Letran school colors	UPHD school colors	CSB school colors
UPHSD	EAC school colors	JRU school colors	SSC-R school colors	Lyceum school colors	Arellano school colors	Mapua school colors	San Beda school colors	Letran school colors	CSB school colors	Arellano school colors	EAC school colors	CSB school colors	JRU school colors	Mapua school colors	San Beda school colors	Lyceum school colors	Letran school colors	SSC-R school colors

= Win; = OT win; = Loss; = OT loss

==== Scores ====
Team	AU	CSJL	CSB-LSGH	EAC-ICA	JRU	LPU	MHSS	SBC-R	SSC-R	UPHSD
Arellano Braves		65–72	55–79	76–63	78–80	70–62	54–73	51–108	44–87	73–75
Letran Squires	88–65		42–64	87–49	61–67	71–62	58–66	86–100	61–75	79–60
La Salle Green Hills Greenies	71–50	65–36		88–49	74–63	79–38	65–83	59–83	52–62	80–66
EAC-ICA Brigadiers	82–65	66–76	58–92		82–94	80–63	86–101	59–108	67–77	64–83
JRU Light Bombers	70–63	71–75	62–78	66–52		78–48	69–61	54–90	63–80	87–64
Lyceum Junior Pirates	56–66	42–55	50–88	76–78	50–58		58–91	38–119	46–105	64–85
Malayan Red Robins	76–53	56–54	71–89	90–67	64–67	83–45		61–83	60–63	97–58
San Beda Red Cubs	96–56	95–84	86–71	102–78	94–74	108–60	73–55		87–75	98–63
San Sebastian Staglets	96–73	84–75	73–66	83–50	74–68	96–60	67–76	72–77		110–75
Perpetual Altalettes	72–54	77–70	59–85	65–61	71–78	83–68	71–81	46–85	49–84	

Legend: Blue = left column team win; Red = top row team win.
Matches with lighter background shading were decided after overtime.

=== Bracket ===
Stepladder round 1 (Single-elimination)
3	LSGH	59*
4	Malayan	56

Stepladder round 2 (Single-elimination)
2	San Sebastian	72
3	LSGH	76

Finals (No. 1 thrice-to-beat)
1	San Beda	79	65
3	LSGH	68	59

*Overtime

=== Stepladder semifinals ===
Each game is sudden-death.

==== (3) LSGH vs. (4) Malayan ====
November 7
10:00 a.m.

La Salle Green Hills Greenies	59–56	Mapúa Red Robins
La Salle advances to the stepladder semifinals round 2

Mall of Asia Arena, Pasay

==== (2) San Sebastian vs. (3) LSGH ====
November 9
12:00 p.m.

San Sebastian Staglets	72–76	La Salle Green Hills Greenies
LSGH advances to the Finals

Filoil Flying V Arena, San Juan

=== Finals ===
November 11
12:30 p.m.

San Beda Red Cubs	79–68	La Salle Green Hills Greenies

Mall of Asia Arena, Pasay

November 14
12:30 p.m.

San Beda Red Cubs	65–59	La Salle Green Hills Greenies
San Beda wins series in two games

Mall of Asia Arena, Pasay

- Finals Most Valuable Player: Arvin Tolentino (San Beda Red Cubs)

=== Awards ===
NCAA Season 89 juniors' basketball champions
San Beda Red Cubs
20th title, fifth consecutive title

The winners were:

- Most Valuable Player: Rashleigh Paolo Rivero (La Salle Green Hills Greenies)
- Rookie of the Year: Jeric Adorio (JRU Light Bombers)
- Mythical Five:
  - Rashleigh Paolo Rivero (La Salle Green Hills Greenies)
  - Jeric Adorio (JRU Light Bombers)
  - Kobe Paras (La Salle Green Hills Greenies)
  - Michael Calisaan (San Sebastian Staglets)
  - Rhanzelle Yong (San Sebastian Staglets)
- Most Improved Player: Kobe Paras (La Salle Green Hills Greenies)
- Defensive Player of the Year: Rashleigh Paolo Rivero (La Salle Green Hills Greenies)

== See also ==
- UAAP Season 76 basketball tournaments

== Overall Championship points ==
Pts.	Position
40	Champion
35	2nd
30	3rd
35	4th
30	5th
20	6th
10	7th
8	8th
6	9th
4	10th
—	Did not join
WD	Withdrew

In case of ties, the team with the higher position in any tournament is ranked higher; if both are still tied, they are listed by alphabetical order.

=== Men's division ===
Team	Total
San Beda Red Lions	50
Letran Knights	40
San Sebastian Stags	35
Perpetual Altas	30
EAC Generals	25
Lyceum Pirates	15
Arellano Chiefs	15
JRU Heavy Bombers	8
Benilde Blazers	6
Mapúa Cardinals	4

=== Juniors' division ===
Team	Total
San Beda Red Cubs	50
La Salle Green Hills Greenies	40
San Sebastian Staglets	35
Mapúa Red Robins	30
JRU Light Bombers	25
Letran Squires	20
Perpetual Junior Altas	10
EAC–ICA Brigadiers	8
Arellano Braves	6
Lyceum Junior Pirates	4

Preceded by Season 88 (2012)	NCAA basketball seasons Season 89 (2013)	Succeeded by Season 90 (2014)
