= La Salle Green Hills Greenies =

Varsity team representing La Salle Green Hills

- School: La Salle Green Hills
- League: NCAA
- Joined: 1998 (with DLS–CSB); 1968–81 (with DLSU)
- Location: Ortigas Avenue, Mandaluyong, Metro Manila
- Team colors: Green, black, and white

Juniors' general championships
- NCAA: 12 1971–72, 1973–74, 1974–75, 1975–76, 1977–78, 1978–79, 1979–80, 1980–81 (with DLSU) 2003–04, 2004–05, 2007–08, 2008–09 (with DLS–CSB)

The La Salle Green Hills Greenies is the varsity team representing La Salle Green Hills (LSGH) located in Mandaluyong, Metro Manila, Philippines. In the National Collegiate Athletic Association (Philippines) (NCAA), they compete as De La Salle–College of Saint Benilde's junior counterparts from 1998 onwards, and are officially designated as "Benilde–LSGH Greenies". From 1968 to 1981, they were De La Salle University's NCAA junior counterparts.

== History ==
La Salle Green Hills' varsity team started as the La Salle Green Hills Rangers from the opening of the school in 1959 until it entered the NCAA as the juniors team representing De La Salle University in 1968, thus renaming them the La Salle Green Hills Greenies. The Greenies enjoyed the spotlight as the NCAA juniors team of the then De La Salle College in Manila (the High School in DLSC was phased out effective 1968 and all its grade school graduates went to La Salle Green Hills High School), winning 8 general championships along the way, until both DLSU and LSGH simultaneously formally withdrew from the NCAA in a press conference in September 1980 effective after the then ongoing 1980–81 NCAA Season.

The Greenies are paired alongside the Green Archers in some competitions, although they are not acknowledged as DLSU's juniors.

== With De La Salle University ==
The Greenies entered the NCAA as the Junior Reps of then De La Salle College in 1968. LSGH took over the slot of the phased out De La Salle College High School which also had the same monikers-the Greenies. That initial NCAA stint of the LSGH Greenies lasted until school year 1980–81 when both DLSU and LSGH formally and simultaneously withdrew from the NCAA. Within that 13-year NCAA period, the Greenies won eight NCAA General Championships. DLSU together with LSGH withdrew from the NCAA due to several brawls between LSGH and main rivals Ateneo de Manila High School, and between DLSU and main rival school Letran. When DLSU applied for the UAAP in 1981, a number of schools (mainly UST and Ateneo de Manila, because they stated that La Salle's entry would spark the infamous rivalry and thus start riots once more) rejected La Salle's application. Five years later after a thorough review by the then UAAP board, they finally accepted La Salle as the eighth member in 1986. Ateneo de Manila also rejected LSGH's application after LSGH's athletes were involved in various riots with some Ateneo Blue Eaglets while they were in the NCAA, this delayed DLSU's spot in the UAAP, thus forcing DLSU to choose the newly established De La Salle–Santiago Zobel School as their representatives in the Juniors' Division.

However, in the annual Filoil EcoOil Preseason Cup which started in 2006, the La Salle Greenies were selected to be the juniors team of the De La Salle Green Archers, thus being the first time the Greenies played alongside the Green Archers since 1981.

== With De La Salle–College of Saint Benilde ==
When DLSU and DLSZ entered the UAAP in 1986, La Salle Green Hills was left without a membership in either the UAAP or the NCAA, thus starting a 17-year drought in a major collegiate league since its formal withdrawal from the NCAA in 1981. La Salle Green Hills however continued participating in several major grade school and high school leagues such as the PAYA, Nike, RIFA Football League, Baseball Pony League, PRADA, MMBL, and Fr. Martin's Cup.

De La Salle–College of Saint Benilde, a brother college of De La Salle University, applied for admission to the NCAA through the efforts of then De La Salle University President Brother Andrew Gonzalez FSC and the La Salle Green Hills President Brother Bernard Oca FSC, who selected the Greenies to be the juniors team. Both De La Salle–College of Saint Benilde and La Salle Green Hills were admitted to the NCAA in 1998. Although the team name of La Salle Green Hills is Greenies, the school's official mascot is the Green Archer (taken from the former De La Salle Greenies of the now defunct De La Salle High School in Taft). Alternatively, LSGH's juniors teams in the NCAA have been called the Junior Blazers to reflect its status as Benilde's high school representative. Since then they have won four General Championships and championships in various events, particularly basketball, football, lawn tennis, track & field, and swimming.

After La Salle Green Hills became a co-educational institution in 2021, the school began establishing its own girls' varsity teams, most notably in girls volleyball.

== Season-by-season basketball record ==
Season	League	Elimination round						Playoffs			
Season	League	Pos	GP	W	L	PCT	GB	GP	W	L	Results
2005	NCAA	5th/7	12	5	7	.417	6	Did not qualify			
2006	NCAA	5th/7	12	5	7	.417	4	Did not qualify			
2007	NCAA	5th/6	10	3	7	.300	5	Did not qualify			
2008	NCAA	4th/7	12	7	5	.583	5	1	0	1	Lost stepladder round 1 vs. JRU
2009	NCAA	6th/10	18	8	10	.444	9	Did not qualify			
2010	NCAA	5th/10	18	9	7	.563	5	1	0	1	Lost 4th-seed playoff vs. Letran
2011	NCAA	3rd/10	18	13	5	.722	5	5	3	2	Lost Finals vs. San Beda
2012	NCAA	3rd/10	18	13	5	.722	4	2	1	1	Lost semifinals vs San Sebastian
2013	NCAA	3rd/10	18	13	5	.722	5	4	2	2	Lost Finals vs. San Beda
2014	NCAA	5th/10	18	11	7	.611	4	Did not qualify			
2015	NCAA	4th/10	18	11	7	.611	7	2	1	1	Lost stepladder round 1 vs. Arellano
2016	NCAA	3rd/10	18	13	5	.722	4	2	1	1	Lost semifinals vs. Malayan
2017	NCAA	4th/10	18	11	7	.611	2	6	5	1	Won Finals vs. Malayan
2018	NCAA	1st/10	18	16	2	.889	—	5	2	3	Lost Finals vs. Malayan
2019	NCAA	4th/10	18	10	8	.556	7	2	1	1	Lost semifinals vs. San Beda
2020	NCAA	Not held due to the COVID-19 pandemic									
2021	NCAA	Not held due to the COVID-19 pandemic									
2023	NCAA	3rd/10	9	6	3	.667	2	5	2	3	Lost Finals vs. Letran
2024	NCAA	7th/10	9	3	6	.333	5	Did not qualify			
2025 (S100)	NCAA	3rd/10	9	6	3	.667	2	5	2	3	Lost Finals vs Perpetual
2025 (S101)	NCAA	3rd/5	13	7	6	.538	3	1	0	1	Lost quarterfinals vs Arellano
2026	NCAA	2nd/5	13	9	4	.692	1				

== See also ==
- Zobel Junior Archers and Lady Junior Archers, De La Salle University's partner high school teams in the UAAP
