= San Beda Red Lions basketball =

Philippine collegiate basketball team

San Beda Red Lions
2026 San Beda Red Lions basketball team
- University: San Beda University
- History: SBC Red Lions (until 2018); SBU Red Lions (since 2018)
- Head coach: Yuri Escueta (5th season)
- Location: Mendiola, Manila
- Nickname: Red Lions
- Colors: Red and White

PCCL Championships (2)
- 2014, 2015

NCAA Championships (24)
- 1927; 1934; 1935; 1936; 1940; 1951; 1952; 1955; 1959; 1977; 1978; 2006; 2007; 2008; 2010; 2011; 2012; 2013; 2014; 2016; 2017; 2018; 2023; 2025

The San Beda Red Lions basketball program represents San Beda University (SBU) in men's basketball as a member of the National Collegiate Athletic Association (Philippines) (NCAA). The San Beda Red Lions are the only remaining founding team in the NCAA.

== History ==
Then known as San Beda College (SBC), the Mendiola-based school co-founded the NCAA in 1924, winning its first seniors' basketball title in 1927, then three straight titles from 1934 to 1936. Their three-year title run during the 1930s was led by Charles Borck.

=== Zamora Cup and 1970s back-to-back titles ===
The Zamora Cup was awarded to the first NCAA team that wins three titles after World War II. San Beda led by Carlos Loyzaga emerged as the frontrunner in 1952, winning two titles by then. The Ateneo Blue Eagles then won the next two titles. In 1955, San Beda and Ateneo made it to the Finals, in which the Red Lions won and kept permanent possession of the trophy. San Beda finished the 1950s with another title in 1959, this time led by Alberto Reynoso.

San Beda would not a win title again until 1977. Coached by Loreto Carbonell and led by Frankie Lim and Chito Loyzaga (Carlos's son), the Red Lions defeated Ateneo, with the deciding game being played behind closed doors due to rampant hooliganism at that time. The Red Lions defended their title in 1978, defeating the De La Salle Green Archers. San Beda withdrew from the NCAA in 1984 to focus on intramural events;

=== Return to the NCAA ===
San Beda returned in 1986 The Red Lions made it to the Finals in 1991, only to be thwarted by Benny Cheng's game winner for the Mapua Cardinals. They made another Finals appearance in 1996, this time against the undefeated four-time defending champions San Sebastian Stags but lost. The Red Lions again made it to the Finals in 1997 but were again defeated by the Stags. During this back-to-back Finals appearance, they were coached by Dong Vergeire.

San Beda won't make it to the playoffs again until 2004. On that season, they took the Perpetual Altas to two games in the semifinals before they were eliminated. Nash Racela, who was coaching the Red Lions at this time, was sacked at the middle of the next season and was replaced by Koy Banal.

=== Dynasty ===
In the 21st century, the Red Lions have qualified to 14 consecutive Finals, from 2006 to 2019. This was after a successful "End 28 at 82" run where they defeated the PCU Dolphins to end their 28-year title drought during the NCAA Season 82. The iconic team coached by Koy Banal the Red Lions were led by Yousif Aljamal, Ogie Menor and Nigerian import Samuel Ekwe. The next year, they matched the 1977–78 team by winning back-to-back titles defeating the Letran Knights. The Red Lions made it three consecutive titles in 2008, beating the JRU Heavy Bombers.

The Red Lions were now gunning for a fourth consecutive title, but were stopped by San Sebastian in 2009. The Red Lions won the next two Finals match-ups against the Stags. In the basketball offseason, the Red Lions men's basketball team were involved in a brawl with the San Sebastian women's volleyball team; this led to the NCAA suspending Lim for two years. Lim left the Red Lions and was replaced by Ronnie Magsanoc. With players like Garvo Lanete, Borgie Hermida and American import Sudan Daniel, Magsanoc coached the team to a convincing Finals decider against Letran. Boyet Fernandez replaced Magsanoc in the next season, and won two more titles, in 2013 with a rematch against Letran, and in 2014 against the Arellano Chiefs. This five-year title run matched San Sebastian's domination from 1993 to 1997.

Seeking an unprecedented sixth straight championship in 2015, the Red Lions, now coached by Jamike Jarin, faced Letran anew in the Finals, the Knights won, and stopped San Beda's title run at five. The team would return in the Finals in 2016, against the Chiefs; bannered by Robert Bolick, Javee Mocon and Finals MVP Arnaud Noah of Cameroon, Jarin clinched his first NCAA title against Arellano. Fernandez returned in 2017, and won two consecutive titles against the Lyceum Pirates, being reinforced by the Cameroonian Donald Tankoua.

In their 21st Finals appearance, the 2020 Red Lions faced the last team that defeated them in the Finals in Letran. The Knights won in the Finals in three games. Due to the COVID pandemic, the NCAA did not hold the basketball events in the 2020 season, and played the 2021 tournament in early 2022. San Beda were upended by the Mapua Cardinals in the elimination round and entered the playoffs without the twice-to-beat advantage. The Cardinals eliminated the San Beda, snapping their Finals streak at 14 years. Management decided not to renew Fernandez's contract, and hired Yuri Escueta to replace him. Escueta coached the Red Lions to another Final Four appearance, but failed to progress to the Finals, losing out to the Benilde Blazers. On his second campaign, Escueta led the Red Lions to a third seed finish after the eliminations, then upset the Lyceum Pirates in the semifinals. San Beda won the title in three games, defeating the #1 seed Mapua Cardinals. In 2024, the San Beda Red Lions lost in the semifinals to the Benilde Blazers. The following year, the Red Lions defeated the Benilde Blazers in the semifinals then swept their rivals, the Letran Knights in the finals to win the NCAA Season 101 Championship.

== Current roster ==
NCAA Season 102

San Beda Red Lions roster
Players
Coaches

Pos.	No.	Nat.	Name	Height	Year	High School
F	8	(Philippines)	Bonzalida, JC	6'6" (1.98m)	2nd	Adamson University
F	13	(Philippines)	Calimag, RC (C)	6'4" (1.93m)	3rd	La Salle Green Hills
G	5	(United States)	Efron, Kai	6'2" (1.88m)	1st	Coronado High School
G	1	(Philippines)	Calimag, Recaredo JR.	6'1" (1.85m)	–	University of the Visayas
G	0	(Philippines)	Estacio, Penny	6'2" (1.88m)	–	San Beda University
F	15	(Philippines)	Etulle, Zedjay	6'5" (1.96m)	–	Aklan Polytechnic College
G/F	12	(Philippines)	Gonzales, Nygel (Injured)	6'4" (1.93m)	3rd	Mapua University
F	10	(Philippines)	Jalbuena, Zane	6'5" (1.96m)	–	–
PG	4	(Philippines)	Jamora, Kyle Francis	5'10" (1.78m)	–	–
C	7	(Philippines)	Lina, Bismarck	6'7" (2.01m)	5th	University of Santo Tomas
F	2	(Canada)	Puno, Jomel	6'6" (1.98m)	5th	University of the Fraser Valley
PG	3	(United States)	Reyes, Jimuel	5'11" (1.8m)	5th	A. B. Miller High School
G	16	(Philippines)	Marcelo, Daniel	5'11" (1.8m)	–	–
F	27	(Philippines)	Songcuya, Menard	6'4" (1.93m)	–	–
SF	18	(Philippines)	Ugaddan, Andrei	6'3" (1.91m)	–	–
G	23	(United States)	Sarigumba, Dominic	6'0" (1.83m)	–	–
G	31	(Philippines)	Dabao, Maco	–	–	–
PF	36	(United States)	Hawkins, Lawrence	6'3" (1.91m)	–	–
F	24	(Philippines)	Torculas, Sean	6'4" (1.93m)	–	–

Head coach

- (Philippines) Yuri Escueta

Assistant coach(es)

- (Philippines) Jenkins Mesina
- (Philippines) Alex Angeles
- (Philippines) Francis Cruz
- (Philippines) Andre Santos
- (Philippines) Boyet Fernandez (consultant)
- (United States) Norman Black (consultant)

Team manager

- (Philippines) Jude Roque

Legend

- (C) Team captain
- Injured

- Roster
Updated: 2025-09-30

== Head coaches ==
- 1950–1954: Felicisimo Fajardo
- 1955–c. 1959: Arturo Rius
- c. 1977–c. 1978: Loreto Carbonell
- 1988: Conrado Castañada
- 1989–1991: Orlando Castelo
- 1991–1992: Boy Ascue
- 1993–1994: Rogelio Melencio
- 1995–1999: Dong Vergeire
- 2000: Ato Badolato
- 2001: Rene Baena
- 2002–2003: Jonathan Reyes
- 2004–2005: Nash Racela
- 2005–2006: Koy Banal
- 2007–2011: Frankie Lim
- 2012: Ronnie Magsanoc
- 2013–2014: Boyet Fernandez
- 2015–2016: Jamike Jarin
- 2017–2022: Boyet Fernandez
- 2022–present: Yuri Escueta

== Retired numbers ==
- #14, Carlos Loyzaga (2016)

== Season-by-season records ==
Season	League	Elimination round						Playoffs			
Season	League	Pos	GP	W	L	PCT	GB	GP	W	L	Results
1999	NCAA	5th/8	14	6	8	.429	3	Did not qualify			
2000	NCAA	6th/8	14	5	9	.357	6	Did not qualify			
2001	NCAA	8th/8	14	2	12	.143	9	Did not qualify			
2002	NCAA	7th/8	14	2	12	.143	9	Did not qualify			
2003	NCAA	6th/8	14	6	8	.429	3	Did not qualify			
2004	NCAA	4th/8	14	7	7	.500	3	3	2	1	Lost semifinals vs Perpetual
2005	NCAA	7th/8	14	4	10	.286	9	Did not qualify			
2006	NCAA	1st/8	14	13	1	.929	—	4	3	1	Won Finals vs PCU
2007	NCAA	1st/7	12	11	1	.917	—	3	3	0	Won Finals vs Letran
2008	NCAA	1st/8	14	11	3	.786	—	5	3	2	Won Finals vs JRU
2009	NCAA	1st/10	18	16	2	.889	—	4	2	2	Lost Finals vs San Sebastian
2010	NCAA	1st/9	16	16	0	1.000	—	2	2	0	Won Finals vs San Sebastian
2011	NCAA	1st/10	18	16	2	.889	—	4	4	0	Won Finals vs San Sebastian
2012	NCAA	1st/10	18	15	3	.833	—	4	3	1	Won Finals vs Letran
2013	NCAA	1st/10	18	15	3	.833	—	4	3	1	Won Finals vs Letran
2014	NCAA	1st/10	18	13	5	.722	—	4	4	0	Won Finals vs Arellano
2015	NCAA	1st/10	18	13	5	.722	—	5	3	2	Lost Finals vs Letran
2016	NCAA	1st/10	18	14	4	.778	—	5	4	1	Won Finals vs Arellano
2017	NCAA	2nd/10	18	16	2	.889	2	3	3	0	Won Finals vs Lyceum
2018	NCAA	1st/10	18	17	1	.944	—	3	3	0	Won Finals vs Lyceum
2019	NCAA	1st/10	18	18	0	1.000	—	3	1	2	Lost Finals vs Letran
2020 (Note: Season cancelled due to the COVID-19 pandemic.)	NCAA	Season canceled									
2021 (Note: Season postponed to early 2022 due to the COVID-19 pandemic.)	NCAA	3rd/10	9	7	2	.778	2	3	2	1	Lost semifinals vs Mapua
2022	NCAA	4th/10	18	12	6	.667	2	1	0	1	Lost semifinals vs Benilde
2023	NCAA	3rd/10	18	12	6	.667	3	5	4	1	Won Finals vs Mapua
2024	NCAA	3rd/10	18	10	8	.556	5	1	0	1	Lost semifinals vs Benilde
2025	NCAA	1st/5	13	9	4	.692	—	6	5	1	Won Finals vs Letran
2026	NCAA	1st/5	13	10	3	.769	—				

== Honors ==
=== Team honors ===
- Philippine Collegiate Champions League (PCCL)
  - Champions (2): 2014, 2015
- National Collegiate Athletic Association (NCAA)
  - Champions (24): 1927, 1934, 1935, 1936, 1940, 1951, 1952, 1955, 1959, 1977, 1978, 2006, 2007, 2008, 2010, 2011, 2012, 2013, 2014, 2016, 2017, 2018, 2023, 2025

=== Player honors ===
- NCAA Most Valuable Player
  - Charles Borck (1): 1936
  - Arturo Rius (1) 1940
  - Carlos Loyzaga (2): 1951, 1952
  - Alberto Reynoso (1): 1959
  - Antonio Valeriano (1): 1991
  - Sam Ekwe (2): 2006, 2008
  - Sudan Daniel (1): 2010
  - Calvin Oftana (1): 2019
- NCAA Finals Most Valuable Player
  - Yousif Aljamal (1): 2006
  - Ogie Menor (1): 2007
  - Sam Ekwe (1): 2008
  - Sudan Daniel (1): 2010
  - Dave Marcelo (1): 2011
  - Baser Amer (1): 2012
  - Art dela Cruz (1): 2013
  - Anthony Semerad (1): 2014
  - Arnauld Noah (1): 2016
  - Donald Tankoua (1): 2017
  - Javee Mocon (1): 2018
  - James Payosing (1): 2023
  - Bryan Sajonia (1): 2025
- NCAA Rookie of the Year
  - Ronnie Bughao: 2003
  - Sam Ekwe: 2006
  - Dave Marcelo: 2007
  - Sudan Daniel: 2009
- NCAA Defensive Player of the Year
  - Sam Ekwe (1): 2006
  - Sudan Daniel (2): 2009, 2010
- NCAA Most Improved Player
  - Jake Pascual (1): 2009
  - Donald Tankoua (1): 2016
- NCAA Best Foreign Player
  - Donald Tankoua (1): 2019

== See also ==
- FilBasket
