= NCAA Season 83 basketball tournaments =

NCAA Season 83
- .
- Host school: Jose Rizal University
| Men's Finals | G1 | G2 | Wins |
|---|---|---|---|
| San Beda Red Lions | 76 | 76 | 2 |
| Letran Knights | 68 | 64 | 0 |
- Duration: September 19 to 26, 2007
- Arena: Araneta Coliseum
- Finals MVP: Rogemar Menor
- Winning coach: Frankie Lim (1st title)
- Semifinalists: JRU Heavy Bombers; Mapúa Cardinals
- TV networks: Studio 23 and TFC
| Juniors' Finals | G1 | G2 | Wins |
|---|---|---|---|
| San Sebastian Staglets | 90 | 88 | 2 |
| Letran Squires | 72 | 83 | 0 |
- Duration: September 19 to 26, 2007
- Arena: Araneta Coliseum
- Finals MVP: Ryan Buenafe
- Winning coach: Raymond Valenzona (3rd title)
- Semifinalists: San Beda Red Cubs; JRU Light Bombers
- TV networks: Studio 23 and TFC

The basketball tournaments of National Collegiate Athletic Association (Philippines) 83rd season hosted by Jose Rizal University began on June 23, 2007 at the Araneta Coliseum with Samahang Basketbol ng Pilipinas president Manuel V. Pangilinan as the keynote speaker. All subsequent elimination round games will be held at The Arena in San Juan (except for the penultimate playdate, which was held at the Araneta). The theme of the season is "Soaring High at 83" while the Studio 23 coverage uses the theme "Brotherhood of the ball" .

== Men's tournament ==
=== Teams ===
| Team | College | Coach |
|---|---|---|
| Letran Knights | Colegio de San Juan de Letran (CSJL) | (Philippines) Louie Alas |
| Benilde Blazers | De La Salle–College of Saint Benilde (CSB) | (Philippines) Caloy Garcia |
| JRU Heavy Bombers | José Rizal University (JRU) | (Philippines) Ariel Vanguardia |
| Mapúa Cardinals | Mapúa Institute of Technology (MIT) | (Philippines) Leo Isaac |
| San Beda Red Lions | San Beda College (SBC) | (Philippines) Frankie Lim |
| San Sebastian Stags | San Sebastian College – Recoletos (SSC-R) | (Philippines) Jorge Gallent |
| Perpetual Altas | University of Perpetual Help System DALTA (UPHSD) | (Philippines) Bai Cristobal |

==== Changes from last season ====
Suspended teams:

- PCU Dolphins

=== Preseason ===
San Beda Red Lions replaced their head coach; Purefoods assistant coach Koy Banal was replaced by Talk 'N Text team manager Frankie Lim, while the Mapua Cardinals hired former Cardinal Leo Isaac to replace Horacio Lim (no relation to the Talk 'N Text team manager). San Sebastian, meanwhile, hired Philippine Basketball League champion coach Jorge Gallent of the Harbour Centre Batang Pier.

With the suspension of the PCU Dolphins, only seven teams competed in the tournament.

The tournament began on June 23 with a triple-header at the Araneta Coliseum with hosts JRU facing defending champions San Beda while Intramuros rivals Letran and Mapua faced off in the last televised game. The remaining elimination round games are set to be held at The Arena in San Juan.

=== Elimination round ===
The opening day was held at the Araneta Coliseum with Samahang Basketbol ng Pilipinas president Manuel V. Pangilinan as the keynote speaker. All subsequent elimination round games were held at The Arena in San Juan.

==== Team standings ====
| Pos | Team | W | L | PCT | GB | Qualification |
|---|---|---|---|---|---|---|
| 1 | San Beda Red Lions | 11 | 1 | .917 | — | Twice-to-beat in the semifinals |
| 2 | Letran Knights | 9 | 3 | .750 | 2 | Twice-to-beat in the semifinals |
| 3 | JRU Heavy Bombers (H) | 7 | 5 | .583 | 4 | Twice-to-win in the semifinals |
| 4 | Mapúa Cardinals | 6 | 6 | .500 | 5 | Twice-to-win in the semifinals |
| 5 | Perpetual Altas | 4 | 8 | .333 (Note: Head-to-head record: Perpetual 1–1 San Sebastian (Perpetual +8)) | 7 | |
| 6 | San Sebastian Stags | 4 | 8 | .333 | 7 | |
| 7 | Benilde Blazers | 1 | 11 | .083 | 10 | |

Source: ABS-CBN Sports
Rules for classification: 1) winning percentage; 2) if tied for top 4, one-game playoff; 3) head-to-head record; 4) head-to-head goal average; 5) overall point differential
(H) Hosts

==== Match-up results ====
| | Round 1 | | | | | | Round 2 | | | | | |
| Team ╲ Game | 1 | 2 | 3 | 4 | 5 | 6 | 7 | 8 | 9 | 10 | 11 | 12 |
|---|---|---|---|---|---|---|---|---|---|---|---|---|
| Letran | Mapua school colors | CSB school colors | SSC-R school colors | UPHD school colors | JRU school colors | San Beda school colors | CSB school colors | UPHD school colors | Mapua school colors | SSC-R school colors | San Beda school colors | JRU school colors |
| Benilde | Mapua school colors | Letran school colors | UPHD school colors | San Beda school colors | SSC-R school colors | JRU school colors | Letran school colors | JRU school colors | San Beda school colors | SSC-R school colors | Mapua school colors | UPHD school colors |
| JRU | San Beda school colors | SSC-R school colors | Mapua school colors | UPHD school colors | Letran school colors | CSB school colors | Mapua school colors | CSB school colors | UPHD school colors | San Beda school colors | SSC-R school colors | Letran school colors |
| Mapúa | Letran school colors | CSB school colors | San Beda school colors | JRU school colors | SSC-R school colors | UPHD school colors | San Beda school colors | JRU school colors | Letran school colors | SSC-R school colors | UPHD school colors | CSB school colors |
| San Beda | JRU school colors | UPHD school colors | Mapua school colors | CSB school colors | SSC-R school colors | Letran school colors | Mapua school colors | SSC-R school colors | CSB school colors | JRU school colors | UPHD school colors | Letran school colors |
| San Sebastian | UPHD school colors | JRU school colors | Letran school colors | Mapua school colors | CSB school colors | San Beda school colors | San Beda school colors | Mapua school colors | CSB school colors | Letran school colors | JRU school colors | UPHD school colors |
| Perpetual | SSC-R school colors | San Beda school colors | CSB school colors | Letran school colors | JRU school colors | Mapua school colors | Letran school colors | JRU school colors | Mapua school colors | CSB school colors | San Beda school colors | SSC-R school colors |

= Win; = OT win; = Loss; = OT loss

==== Scores ====
Results on top and to the right of the dashes are for first-round games; those to the bottom and to the left of it are second-round games.

| Teams | CSJL | CSB | JRU | MIT | SBC | SSC-R | UPHSD |
|---|---|---|---|---|---|---|---|
| Letran Knights | — | 92–81 | 75–79 | 84–80 | 70–69 | 71–61 | 68–52 |
| Benilde Blazers | 49–51 | — | 63–74 | 74–68 | 65–87 | 54–60 | 52–62 |
| JRU Heavy Bombers | 71–74 | 81–64 | — | 80–86 | 69–91 | 68–66 | 72–79* |
| Mapúa Cardinals | 89–82 | 84–71 | 61–69 | — | 77–87 | 63–66 | 85–75* |
| San Beda Red Lions | 87–84 | 81–61 | 82–74 | 89–75 | — | 73–64 | 86–62 |
| San Sebastian Stags | 63–67 | 75–58 | 73–80* | 71–80 | 76–96 | — | 59–56 |
| Perpetual Altas | 56–63 | 66–52 | 62–65 | 64–83 | 76–99 | 89–78 | — |

Source: Philippine Daily Inquirer
Legend: Blue = left column team win; Red = top row team win.
Matches with lighter background shading were decided after overtime.

=== Postseason teams ===
==== San Beda Red Lions ====
San Beda attempted to sweep the first round and dominated the opposition; on the final game of the first round, the Red Lions faced the second place Letran Knights. SBC led for much of the game, but the Knights came back, capped with 6 points in the last minutes by Letran's Rey Guevarra, who converted an undergoal stab to put Letran up for good, after San Beda's Pong Escobal converted a disputed two-point shot.

The Red Lions rebounded after their loss and had a 5-game winning streak leading up to their second-round rematch with Letran. They won a notable game over JRU that embroiled San Beda in a legal tussle with the league (see Aljamal suspension, below). JRU committed 3 unsportsmanlike fouls as SBC head coach Frankie Lim and JRU mentor Ariel Vanguardia had a shouting match in the Arena's corridors after the game. San Beda avenged their first round loss against Letran with a win in which they led for the whole second half.

==== Letran Knights ====
After a 4-0 start, the Knights were dealt their first loss by season's host JRU, but after rallying from 20 points down came up short. Their win over San Beda ensured a #1 finish for the Knights, but their Intramuros rivals Mapua denied them another 4-0 streak as MVP candidate Kelvin dela Peña bailed out the Cardinals with an almost triple-double performance. Letran won their next game against San Sebastian to set up their rematch.

Trailing most of the game, Letran cut the deficit to two but a Borgie Hermida three-pointer kept the Knights from victory as they were beaten by San Beda 87-84 at the sold-out Araneta Coliseum. After the game, Letran players and San Beda supporters engaged in a brawl. The coaches and players received trivial punishments. Letran beat JRU in a frantic finish to seize the #2 seed.

==== JRU Heavy Bombers ====
JRU suffered an opening game loss against San Beda but rebounded in the next game to beat San Sebastian. However, they were beaten two more times, one via overtime against UPHD to fall with a 1-3 card. JRU seized the advantage on their game against Letran and held on to win.

JRU then made 5 consecutive wins, assuring themselves of the last semi-final berth. San Beda then broke the winning streak in a fight-marred game in which 3 JRU players were assessed with unsportsmanlike fouls. On their next game against SSC-R (which needed to win to stay in contention), the Bombers rallied with a 7-0 run in the last 2 minutes to force overtime and an eventual win. With the Bombers losing to the Knights in their rescheduled game, JRU now had to beat Letran consecutively to enter the Finals.

==== Mapúa Cardinals ====
Mapúa started on the wrong foot with a 0-3 start with losses against rivals Letran, against CSB (their only win in the season) and San Beda without last year's suspended MVP, Sam Ekwe. Mapúa then won against JRU and Perpetual in overtime to finish the first round against 2-4.

Mapúa lost a further two games against San Beda and JRU, but defeated Letran. Anchored by two-time player of the week Kelvin dela Peña, Mapúa won the next 4 games in order to finish with 6-6. Typhoons suspended some of the games, allowing the Cardinals to finish a week early. San Sebastian's losses enabled Mapúa to clinch the #4 berth a semis rematch against San Beda, which had eliminated them in the 2006 semifinals.

=== Bracket ===
Semifinals (Top 2 twice-to-beat)
1 | San Beda | 74
4 | Mapúa | 64
2 | Letran | 70
3 | JRU | 61

Finals (Best-of-three playoff)
1 | San Beda | 76 | 76
2 | Letran | 68 | 64

=== Semifinals ===
Letran and San Beda have the twice-to-beat advantage. They only have to win once, while their opponents, twice, to progress.

==== (1) San Beda vs. (4) Mapua ====
Studio 23

September 12
4:00 p.m.

| San Beda Red Lions | 74–64 | Mapúa Cardinals |
Scoring by quarter: 21-15, 16-18, 24-13, 13-18
| Pts: Yousif Aljamal 26; Rebs: Ekwe, Hermida 13 each Asts: Pong Escobal 9 | | Pts: Kelvin dela Peña 14; Rebs: Kelvin dela Peña 11; Asts: Sean Co 6 |
San Beda wins series in one game

Araneta Coliseum, Quezon City

Mapua raced to an 11-6 lead, but after a Frankie Lim time out, San Beda cut the lead and eventually pulled away in the third quarter. MVP candidate Yousif Aljamal carried the team with several clutch three-pointers to keep the Cardinals at bay. Kelvin dela Peña's outside sniping cut the San Beda lead to 8 from a high of 14 before Aljamal converted another three-pointer. After not scoring, the Cardinals forced a turnover, but dela Peña was not able to convert a contested fastbreak lay-up to dash Mapua's hopes of a championship.

===== (2) Letran vs. (3) JRU =====
Studio 23

September 12
2:00 p.m.

| Letran Knights | 70–61 | JRU Heavy Bombers |
Scoring by quarter: 11-15, 17-15, 15-15, 27-16
| Pts: RJ Jazul 17; Rebs: Andrew Quinday 9 Asts: RJ Jazul 3 | | Pts: Wilson, Sena 12 each Rebs: Wilson, Hayes 11 each Asts: JR Bulangis 3 |
Letran wins series in one game

Araneta Coliseum, Quezon City

With fans wearing "We believe" shirts, the Heavy Bombers expected a battle of attrition against the Knights. Letran was able to make outside jumpers, with Bryan Faundo scoring the bulk of the points in the first three quarters; JRU meanwhile relied on the offensive rebounds of Marvin Hayes and James Sena to keep in pace with the Knights. In the fourth quarter Letran relied on RJ Jazul who scored 8 of his game-high 17 points to break the game open.

==== Finals ====
Studio 23

September 19
4:00 p.m.

| San Beda Red Lions | 76–68 | Letran Knights |
Scoring by quarter: 14-23, 21-11, 13-13, 28-21
| Pts: Ogie Menor 23; Rebs: Sam Ekwe 18; Asts: Pong Escobal 5 | | Pts: RJ Jazul 17; Rebs: Andrew Quinday 8 Asts: Dino Daa 4 |

Araneta Coliseum, Quezon City
Attendance: ~18,000

Studio 23

September 26
4:00 p.m.

| San Beda Red Lions | 76–64 | Letran Knights |
Scoring by quarter: 26-12, 17-17, 14-20, 19-15
| Pts: Ogie Menor 25; Rebs: Sam Ekwe 13; Asts: Hermida, Escobal 6 each | | Pts: Bryan Faundo 17; Rebs: Bryan Faundo 10; Asts: RJ Jazul 3 |
San Beda wins series, 2-0

Araneta Coliseum, Quezon City

- Finals Most Valuable Player: Rogemar Menor (San Beda Red Lions)

In Game 1, San Beda and Letran started the game by trading baskets, then Letran broke away after their time out to lead by seven at the end of the first period. San Beda answered with their own 10-0 run to lead by a point. The two teams battled evenly in a low-scoring third quarter. However, San Beda had a deciding run when RJ Jazul sat down after a hard foul at the beginning of the fourth quarter. Jazul came back cold and the Knights weren't able to come close as San Beda took game 1.

San Beda raced into an early lead in Game 2 where Letran had a tough time recovering; the nearest they came was five points late in the third quarter. San Beda held off Letran due to their fast break plays, thanks to rebounds of Nigerian behemoth Sam Ekwe.

Ogie Menor was named Finals Most Valuable Player.

=== Suspensions ===
- Samuel Ekwe of the San Beda Red Lions after kicking Lee Sang Myeon of UPHD Altas. Served one-game suspension at their July 4 game against the Mapua Cardinals. This suspension disqualified Ekwe for MVP contention.
- Coach Jorge Gallent of the San Sebastian Stags after being ejected for two technical fouls on a game against the Letran Knights. Served one-game suspension at their July 13 game against the Mapua Cardinals; Staglets coach Raymond Valenzona coached in place of him.
- St. Benilde Blazers shooting guard Paolo Orbeta has been arrested by the National Bureau of Investigation for alleged game-fixing in NCAA games. This has been the first arrest in game-fixing since the investigation last season. Orbera has been suspended by CSB and the NCAA indefinitely starting from their second-round game against the JRU Heavy Bombers as further investigation continues.

==== Aljamal suspension ====
After Yousif Aljamal of the San Beda Red Lions was drafted at the 2007 Philippine Basketball Association (PBA) Draft, he was suspended by the NCAA Management Committee (MANCOMM) for the rest of the season after not informing the MANCOMM that he was joining the draft (5 other players from the previous two seasons were able to play after they were drafted). San Beda appealed the decision, and Aljamal should have served his suspension from their August 22 game against the JRU Heavy Bombers. San Beda was able to secure a 72-hour temporary restraining order (TRO) that allowed Aljamal to play in the San Beda-JRU game, while the NCAA Policy Board reduced to suspension to three games. With San Beda bringing the issue to the courts, a ranking member of suggested to The Daily Tribune that the Management Committee was considering suspending the basketball season.

With this development, ABS-CBN, the tournament's sole broadcaster, threatened to sue the league if the season was scrapped, citing massive advertising losses for the lost coverage; meanwhile JRU officials denied that cancellation of the season was suggested. San Beda meanwhile threatened to bolt out of the league (again) "if no solution is found to diffuse the ongoing case involving Aljamal." The Manila Regional Trial Court (RTC) then granted a 20-day extension to the order after a lengthy hearing. It was also revealed that JRU President Vicente K. Fabella and top San Beda officials were to meet on Sunday (August 26).

The PBA stated that Aljamal "has never played in a single tournament organized by the PBA and should not be considered a professional basketball player as of now." The NCAA meanwhile asked the Manila RTC to lift the TRO. ABS-CBN executives mediated the matter along with NCAA and San Beda officials. It was revealed that the PBA was the one tasked "to inform the various leagues of their players’ participation in the draft. But problems that beset the PBA have overtaken events and Aljamal was an unwilling victim. It was not his fault and he should not be sanctioned."

At a press conference held at the ABS-CBN Compound in Quezon City, San Beda withdrew their case against the NCAA and made Aljamal "sit out" the remaining elimination games against UPHD and Letran. SBC also apologized to the NCAA for "all the difficulties and bad publicity". The NCAA for its part disregarded the suspensions, placing Aljamal back in the race for individual awards.

=== Awards ===
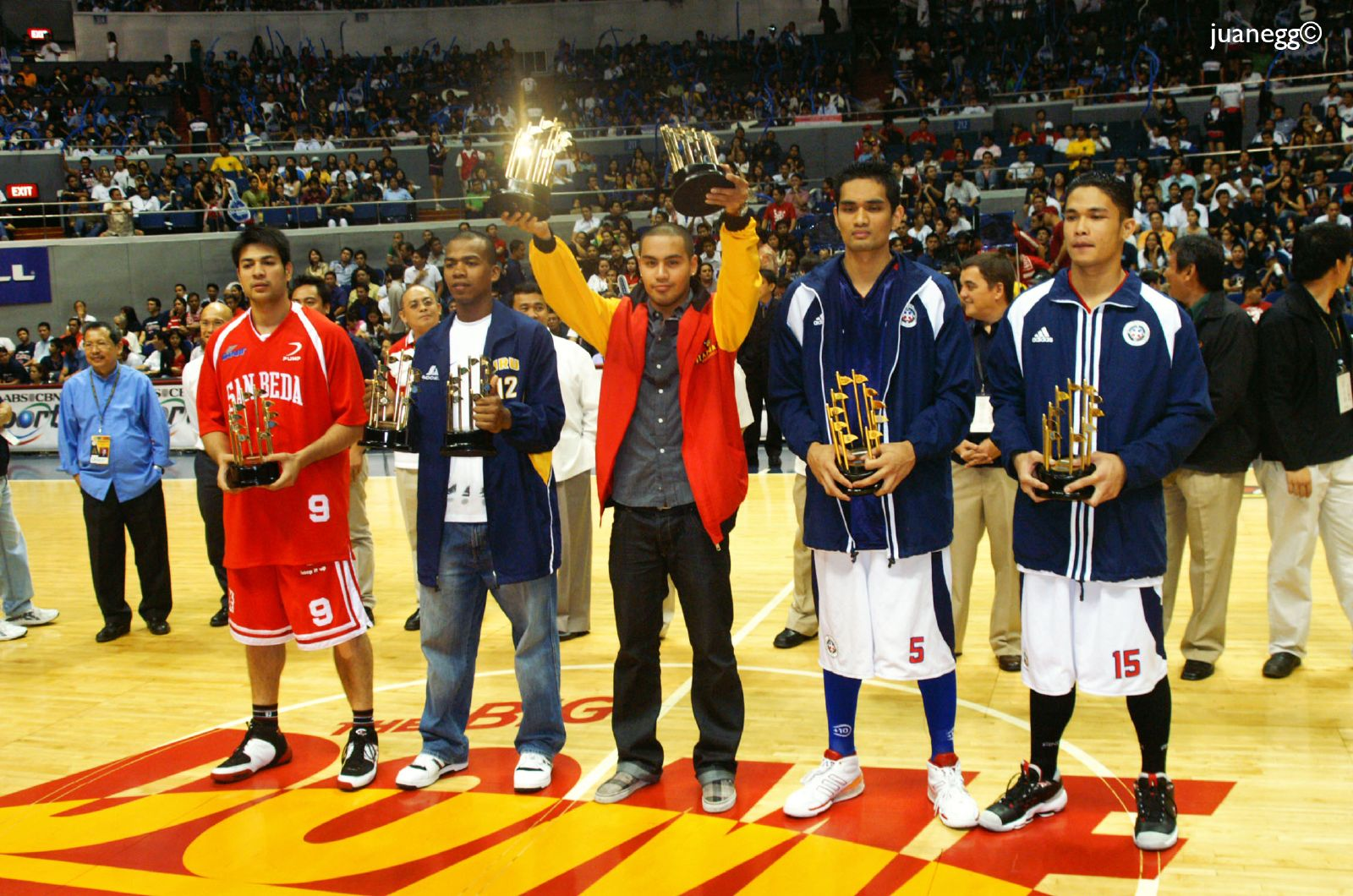
Men's basketball mythical team: Yousif Aljamal, Marvin Hayes, Kelvin dela Peña (also league MVP), Bryan Faundo and Dino Daa.

NCAA Season 83 men's basketball champions
San Beda Red Lions
13th title, second consecutive title

- Most Valuable Player: Kelvin dela Peña (Mapúa Cardinals)
- Mythical Five:
  - Kelvin dela Peña (Mapúa Cardinals)
  - Yousif Aljamal (San Beda Red Lions)
  - Marvin Hayes (JRU Heavy Bombers)
  - Bryan Faundo (Letran Knights)
  - Dino Daa (Letran Knights)
- Rookie of the Year: Dave Marcelo (San Beda Red Lions)
- Most Improved Player:Marvin Hayes (JRU Heavy Bombers)
- Defensive Player of the Year: Jason Ballesteros (San Sebastian Stags)
- Players of the week - The NCAA Press Corps awards an outstanding player every week:
  - Rogemar Menor (June 25-July 1)
  - RJ Jazul (July 2–8)
  - Yousif Aljamal (July 9–15)
  - Rey Guevarra (July 16–29)
  - Kelvin dela Peña (July 30-August 5)
  - Kelvin dela Peña (August 6–12)
  - Jim Viray (August 13–19)
  - Bryan Faundo (August 20–26)
  - Rogemar Menor (August 27-Sept. 2)

=== Statistical leaders ===
- Points: Yousif Aljamal (San Beda, 17.1)
- Rebounds: Samuel Ekwe (San Beda, 16.1)
- Assists: Kelvin dela Peña (Mapua, 5.6)
- Blocks: Samuel Ekwe (San Beda, 3.5)
- Steals: Kelvin dela Peña (Mapua, 2.1)
- Turnovers: Mike Kong (UPHD, 4.7)

== Juniors' tournament ==
The juniors' basketball tournament begins on June 25 at The Arena in San Juan with six schools participating. (Note: PCU Baby Dolphins and Mapua's Malayan Science are expected to join in Season 84.)

=== Elimination round ===
| Pos | Team | W | L | PCT | GB | Qualification |
|---|---|---|---|---|---|---|
| 1 | San Sebastian Staglets | 8 | 2 | .800 | — | Twice-to-beat in the semifinals |
| 2 | Letran Squires | 7 | 3 | .700 | 1 | Twice-to-beat in the semifinals |
| 3 | San Beda Red Cubs | 6 | 4 | .600 | 2 | Twice-to-win in the semifinals |
| 4 | JRU Light Bombers (H) | 5 | 5 | .500 | 3 | Twice-to-win in the semifinals |
| 5 | La Salle Green Hills Greenies | 3 | 7 | .300 | 5 | |
| 6 | Perpetual Altalettes | 1 | 9 | .100 | 7 | |

Source: ABS-CBN Sports
Rules for classification: 1) winning percentage; 2) if tied for top 4, one-game playoff; 3) head-to-head record; 4) head-to-head point differential; 5) overall point differential
(H) Hosts

=== Bracket ===
Semifinals (Top 2 twice-to-beat)
1 | San Sebastian | 85
4 | JRU | 74
2 | Letran | 86 | 96
3 | San Beda | 96 | 92

Finals (Best-of-three playoff)
1 | San Sebastian | 90 | 88
2 | Letran | 72 | 83

=== Semifinals ===
==== (1) San Sebastian vs. (4) JRU ====
Elimination round games:

- July 16: JRU 96-109 San Sebastian at the Arena
- July 30: JRU 71-79 San Sebastian at the Arena

September 12
11:30 a.m.

| San Sebastian Staglets | 85–74 | JRU Light Bombers |
San Sebastian wins series in one game

Araneta Coliseum, Quezon City

==== (2) Letran vs. (3) San Beda ====
Elimination round games:

- July 9: Letran 106-92 San Beda at the Arena
- August 31: Letran 98-96 San Beda at the Araneta Coliseum

September 12
9:30 a.m.

| Letran Squires | 86–96 | San Beda Red Cubs |

Araneta Coliseum, Quezon City

September 14
12:00 p.m.

| Letran Squires | 96–92 | San Beda Red Cubs |
Letran wins series in two games

The Arena in San Juan, San Juan

=== Finals ===
Elimination round games:

- July 2: Letran 75-74 San Sebastian at the Arena
- August 24: Letran 70-64 San Sebastian at the Arena

Studio 23

September 19
2:00 p.m.

| San Sebastian Staglets | 90–72 | Letran Squires |
San Sebastian leads series, 1-0

Araneta Coliseum, Quezon City

Studio 23

September 26
2:00 p.m.

| San Sebastian Staglets | 88–83 | Letran Squires |
Scoring by quarter: 22-15, 24-19, 18-22, 24-27
San Sebastian wins series, 2-0

Araneta Coliseum, Quezon City

- Finals Most Valuable Player: Ryan Buenafe (San Sebastian Staglets)

=== Awards ===
NCAA Season 83 juniors' basketball champions
San Sebastian Staglets
Fourth title, third consecutive title

- Most Valuable Player: Ryan Buenafe (San Sebastian Staglets)
- Rookie of the Year: Keith Agovida (JRU Light Bombers)
- Mythical Five:
  - Arvie Bringas (San Sebastian Staglets)
  - Nico Salva (San Beda Red Cubs)
  - John Michael Noble (Letran Squires)
  - Keith Agovida (JRU Light Bombers)
  - Ryan Buenafe (San Sebastian Staglets)
- Most Improved Player: Christian dela Paz (La Salle Green Hills Greenies)
- Defensive Player of the Year: Keith Agovida (JRU Light Bombers)

== Broadcast notes ==
ABS-CBN's UHF channel Studio 23 was the sole broadcaster of the games, covering all men's games (except for the UPHD-San Sebastian game on opening day), the Letran-San Beda juniors second-round game, and the Finals series of the juniors. 101.9 For Life!, ABS-CBN's FM radio station, delivered updates on game dates.

NCAA College Hoops airs every Monday afternoons as a supplement for the main NCAA coverage. It is hosted by Andrei Felix and San Beda courtside reporter Pia Boren.

Playoffs broadcasters:

| Game | Play-by-play | Analyst | Courtside reporters |
|---|---|---|---|
| Letran-JRU semifinal | Andrei Felix | Butch Maniego | Aica Llave & Melanie Martinez |
| San Beda-Mapua semifinal | Bill Velasco | Allan Gregorio | Pia Boren & Cassie Umali |
| Juniors' Finals Game 1 | Eric Tipan | Jude Roque | Carla Rivera & Bea Atienza |
| Men's Finals Game 1 | Bill Velasco | Butch Maniego | Aica Llave & Pia Boren |
| Juniors' Finals Game 2 | Eric Tipan | Butch Maniego | Carla Rivera & Bea Atienza |
| Men's Finals Game 2 | Bill Velasco | Allan Gregorio | Aica Llave & Pia Boren |

== Champion rosters ==
=== San Beda Red Lions ===
Note: Flags indicate national team eligibility at FIBA sanctioned events. Players may hold other non-FIBA nationality not displayed.

| No. | | Position | Player |
|---|---|---|---|---|
| 4 | (Philippines) | F | Raymund Maggay |
| 5 | (Philippines) | G | Chico Tirona |
| 6 | (Philippines) | G | Riego Gamalinda |
| 7 | (Philippines) | G | Garvo Lanete |
| 9 | (Philippines) | F | Yousif Aljamal |
| 13 | (Nigeria) | C | Samuel Ekwe |
| 14 | (Philippines) | C | Jay-R Taganas |
| 15 | (Philippines) | F | Ogie Menor |
| 16 | (Philippines) | G | Borgie Hermida |
| 18 | (Philippines) | G | Pong Escobal |
| Position | | | Name/s |
| Head coach: | | | (Philippines) Frankie Lim |
| | | | | San Beda Red Lions |

=== San Sebastian Staglets ===
Note: Flags indicate national team eligibility at FIBA sanctioned events. Players may hold other non-FIBA nationality not displayed.

| No. | | Position | Player |
|---|---|---|---|---|
| 4 | (Philippines) | F | Raffy Gusi |
| 5 | (Philippines) | G | Ergil Bautista |
| 8 | (Philippines) | G | Ryan Buenafe |
| 9 | (Philippines) | F | Jon Ortuoste |
| 10 | (Philippines) | C | Kenneth Mamaril |
| 12 | (Philippines) | G | John Delgado |
| 14 | (Philippines) | F | Marco Cam |
| 15 | (Philippines) | F | Fritz Delgado |
| 16 | (Philippines) | F | Arvie Bringas |
| 19 | (Philippines) | C | Yutien Andrada |
| Position | | | Name/s |
| Head coach: | | | (Philippines) Raymond Valenzona |
| | | | | San Sebastian Staglets |

== See also ==
- UAAP Season 70 basketball tournaments

| Preceded by Season 82 (2006) | NCAA basketball seasons Season 83 (2007) | Succeeded by Season 84 (2008) |
