= San Beda–Perpetual rivalry =

Rivalry between the two teams

San Beda–Perpetual men's basketball rivalry
- San Beda Red Lions Perpetual Altas
- Sport: Men's basketball
- Latest meeting: November 16, 2026 (Playtime Filoil Centre, San Juan); San Beda, 73–71
- Next meeting: TBA

Statistics
- All-time record: NCAA Final Four (Philippines) appearances: San Beda 20; Perpetual 10; Titles: San Beda: NCAA 23; Perpetual: NCAA 0
- Longest win streak: San Beda, 12 (2006–2011)
- Current win streak: San Beda, 2 (2026–present)

Locations of San Beda (red) and Perpetual (brown).

This rivalry is between Alabang–Zapote's Perpetual Help and Mendiola's San Beda. The rivalry is played at the National Collegiate Athletic Association (Philippines).

== Head-to-head record by sport ==
=== Seniors' Division ===
==== General Championship ====
San Beda leads the general championship race with 4-2.

- San Beda (4) - 2010-11, 2011-2012, 2012-2013, 2014-2015
- Perpetual (2) - 1995, 1996

=== Juniors' Division ===
==== General Championship ====
San Beda leads the general championship race with 11-0.

- San Beda (11) - 1982, 1988, 1989, 1990, 1991, 1993, 1995, 1996, 1997, 2015
- Perpetual (0)

== Basketball Statistics ==
Also called as New Age Rivalry, Perpetual has emerged as a steady contender in the modern era, but its path to the championship has consistently been blocked by San Beda. In seasons 88, 89, 90, 92, and 94, Perpetual finished the eliminations as the fourth seed and was eliminated in the semifinals by top-seeded San Beda. In each of those seasons, San Beda went on to win the championship.

=== Men's basketball results ===
The final four was instituted in 1997; prior to that the first and second round winners, plus the team with the best overall standing if it did not win either round, participated in the championship round to determine the champion.

==== Pre-Final Four era ====
San Beda victories	Perpetual victories

No.	Date	Location	Winner	Score	Note/s
1	1986	Rizal Memorial Coliseum	Perpetual	1–0	(Note: San Beda was winless in the first round.)
2	1986	Rizal Memorial Coliseum	Perpetual	1–0	(Note: Sophomore quintet Perpetual Help Altas could have sweep the second round if not for the loss to San Sebastian Stags in their last outing.)
3	1987	Rizal Memorial Coliseum	Perpetual	1–0	(Note: San Beda was winless in the second round.)
4	1988	Rizal Memorial Coliseum	Perpetual	1–0	(Note: San Beda's lone second round pennant win came from JRC.)

No.	Date	Location	Winner	Score	Note/s
5	1992	Rizal Memorial Coliseum	San Beda	1–0	(Note: Perpetual's lone second round pennant win came from JRC.)
6	1992	Rizal Memorial Coliseum	San Beda	1–0	(Note: Perpetual was winless in the second round.)
7	October 1, 1996	Rizal Memorial Coliseum	San Beda	90–83	
(*) = finals games; (^) = semifinals; (≠) = seeding playoffs

==== Final Four era ====
Both teams are expected to meet at least 2 times per year.

San Beda victories	Perpetual victories

No.	Date	Location	Winner	Score	Note/s
1	July 28, 2000	Rizal Memorial Coliseum	Perpetual	81–67	
2	August 28, 2000	Rizal Memorial Coliseum	Perpetual	94–78	
3	August 2, 2001	Rizal Memorial Coliseum	Perpetual	84–78	
4	August 30, 2001	Rizal Memorial Coliseum	Perpetual	82–61	
5	July 3, 2002	Rizal Memorial Coliseum	Perpetual	79–77	
6	September 6, 2002	Rizal Memorial Coliseum	San Beda	115–101^{OT}	
7	July 11, 2003	Rizal Memorial Coliseum	San Beda	92–76	
8	August 22, 2003	Rizal Memorial Coliseum	Perpetual	68–63	
9	July 12, 2004	Rizal Memorial Coliseum	Perpetual	75–70	
10	August 9, 2004	Rizal Memorial Coliseum	San Beda	66–52	
11	September 10, 2004^	Araneta Coliseum	San Beda	57–48	(Note: Semifinals. San Beda forced a rubber match.)
12	September 15, 2004^	Araneta Coliseum	Perpetual	58–56	(Note: Semifinals. Perpetual lost in the finals vs. PCU.)
13	July 22, 2005	Cuneta Astrodome	Perpetual	68–63	
14	August 19, 2005	Cuneta Astrodome	Perpetual	66–60	
15	July 19, 2006	Ninoy Aquino Stadium	San Beda	61–45	
16	August 16, 2006	Rizal Memorial Stadium	San Beda	77–57	
17	June 29, 2007	The Arena in San Juan	San Beda	86–62	(Note: Reigning MVP Sam Ekwe got ejected in the game after a scuffle w/ Perpetual Help players which led to his suspension and disqualification to win any individual awards.)
18	August 29, 2007	The Arena in San Juan	San Beda	99–76	
19	July 21, 2008	Cuneta Astrodome	San Beda	70–48	
20	August 18, 2008	Cuneta Astrodome	San Beda	72–55	
21	July 17, 2009	Filoil Flying V Arena	San Beda	98–65	
22	September 4, 2009	Filoil Flying V Arena	San Beda	96–69	
23	July 28, 2010	Filoil Flying V Arena	San Beda	101–77	(Note: San Beda had a 4-0 record prior to the game.)
24	September 1, 2010	Filoil Flying V Arena	San Beda	92–61	(Note: San Beda had a 10-0 record prior to the game.)
25	July 2, 2011	Filoil Flying V Arena	San Beda	82–52	(Note: Opening day game.)
26	August 22, 2011	Filoil Flying V Arena	San Beda	69–55	
27	July 12, 2012	Filoil Flying V Arena	Perpetual	88–87^{OT}	(Note: San Beda had a 2-0 record prior to the game.)
28	September 29, 2012	Filoil Flying V Arena	San Beda	60–53	
29	October 13, 2012^	Araneta Coliseum	San Beda	56–52	(Note: Semifinals. San Beda went on to win the championship vs. Letran.)
30	July 27, 2013	Filoil Flying V Arena	San Beda	72–65	

No.	Date	Location	Winner	Score	Note/s
31	September 26, 2013	Filoil Flying V Arena	San Beda	78–76^{OT}	
32	November 7, 2013^	Mall of Asia Arena	San Beda	70–51	(Note: Semifinals. San Beda went on to win the championship vs. Letran.)
33	August 6, 2014	Filoil Flying V Arena	San Beda	77–75	
34	September 22, 2014	Filoil Flying V Arena	Perpetual	76–75	
35	October 15, 2014^	Mall of Asia Arena	San Beda	81–75	(Note: Semifinals. San Beda went on to win the championship vs. Arellano.)
36	July 28, 2015	Filoil Flying V Arena	San Beda	83–81	
37	September 10, 2015	Filoil Flying V Arena	Perpetual	88–86	
38	July 19, 2016	Filoil Flying V Arena	San Beda	88–70	(Note: San Beda had a 4-0 record prior to the game.)
39	September 20, 2016	Filoil Flying V Arena	San Beda	84–75	(Note: San Beda secures twice to beat advantage.)
40	September 30, 2016^	Mall of Asia Arena	Perpetual	87–83	(Note: Semifinals. Perpetual forced a rubber match.)
41	October 4, 2016^	Mall of Asia Arena	San Beda	78–63	(Note: Semifinals. San Beda went on to win the championship vs. Arellano.)
42	August 17, 2017	UPHSD Gym	San Beda	57–53	(Note: NCAA on tour.)
43	October 3, 2017	Filoil Flying V Arena	San Beda	55–50	(Note: San Beda eliminates Perpetual from the Final Four race.)
44	July 7, 2018	Mall of Asia Arena	San Beda	67–65	(Note: Opening day game.)
45	October 23, 2018	Filoil Flying V Arena	San Beda	80–72	
46	October 26, 2018^	Filoil Flying V Arena	San Beda	83–72	(Note: Semifinals. San Beda has ousted Perpetual Help from the Final Four for the fifth time in the last seven seasons. San Beda went to win the championship vs. Lyceum)
47	August 16, 2019	Filoil Flying V Arena	San Beda	102–56	(Note: San Beda had a 5-0 record prior to the game.)
48	September 26, 2019	Filoil Flying V Arena	San Beda	75–62	(Note: San Beda had a 13-0 record prior to the game.)
49	April 20, 2022	St. Benilde Gym	San Beda	78–71	(Note: San Beda had a 5-0 record prior to the game. First San Beda-Perpetual NCAA game since the COVID-19 pandemic.)
50	October 12, 2022	Filoil EcoOil Centre	San Beda	71–52	
51	October 22, 2022	Filoil EcoOil Centre	Perpetual	75–72^{OT}	
52	October 17, 2023	Filoil EcoOil Centre	San Beda	62–60	(Note: Come-from-behind win by San Beda. Perpetual was on a two-game winning streak prior to the game.)
53	November 10, 2023	Filoil EcoOil Centre	Perpetual	61–57	
54	October 5, 2024	Filoil EcoOil Centre	San Beda	63–62	(Note: First NCAA match-up between the head coaches of San Beda and Perpetual, Yuri Escueta and Olsen Racela, respectively, who are cousins.)
55	October 18, 2024	Filoil EcoOil Centre	San Beda	57–53	
56	October 29, 2025	Playtime Filoil Centre	Perpetual	88–85^{3OT}	(Note: Both Perpetual and San Beda entered the game as the top-seeded teams from Groups A and B, respectively.)
57	October 8, 2026	Playtime Filoil Centre	San Beda	71–63	
58	November 16, 2026^	Playtime Filoil Centre	San Beda	73–71	(Note: Quarterfinals. San Beda advanced to the semifinals and eliminated Perpetual.)
Series: San Beda leads 41–17
(*) = finals games; (^) = semifinals; (≠) = seeding playoffs

=== Juniors' Basketball Results ===
==== Pre-Final Four era ====
San Beda victories	Perpetual victories

No.	Date	Location	Winner	Score	Note/s
1	1988	Rizal Memorial Coliseum	San Beda	1–0	
2	1988	Rizal Memorial Coliseum	San Beda	1–0	(Note: San Beda swept the first and second round pennants.)

No.	Date	Location	Winner	Score	Note/s
3	1990	Rizal Memorial Coliseum	San Beda	1–0	(Note: Perpetual was winless in the elimination round.)
(*) = finals games; (^) = semifinals; (≠) = seeding playoffs

==== Final Four era ====
Both teams are expected to meet at least 2 times per year.

San Beda victories	Perpetual victories

No.	Date	Location	Winner	Score	Note/s
1	2002	Rizal Memorial Coliseum	San Beda	1–0	
2	2002	Rizal Memorial Coliseum	San Beda	1–0	(Note: San Beda swept the elimination round.)
3	2003	Rizal Memorial Coliseum	San Beda	1–0	
4	2003	Rizal Memorial Coliseum	San Beda	1–0	(Note: San Beda swept the elimination round. San Beda won the finals against Mapúa.)
5	2005	Rizal Memorial Coliseum	San Beda	1–0	
6	2005	Rizal Memorial Coliseum	San Beda	1–0	(Note: Perpetual only won against Letran in the elimination round.)
7	2008	Cuneta Astrodome	San Beda	1–0	
8	2008	Cuneta Astrodome	San Beda	1–0	(Note: Perpetual only won against Malayan in the elimination round.)
9	2009	The Arena in San Juan	San Beda	98–85	
10	2009	The Arena in San Juan	San Beda	95–69	(Note: San Beda won in the finals against Letran.)
11	2010	The Arena in San Juan	San Beda	98–85	
12	2010	The Arena in San Juan	San Beda	84–66	(Note: San Beda won in the finals against San Sebastian.)
13	2011	The Arena in San Juan	San Beda	101–62	
14	2011	The Arena in San Juan	San Beda	113–68	(Note: San Beda won in the finals against LSGH.)
15	2012	The Arena in San Juan	San Beda	108–57	
16	2012	The Arena in San Juan	San Beda	96–61	(Note: San Beda won in the finals against San Sebastian.)
17	2013	The Arena in San Juan	San Beda	98–63	
18	2013	The Arena in San Juan	San Beda	85–46	(Note: San Beda won in the finals against LSGH.)
19	2014	The Arena in San Juan	San Beda	106–75	

No.	Date	Location	Winner	Score	Note/s
20	2014	The Arena in San Juan	San Beda	94–78	(Note: San Beda won in the finals against Malayan.)
21	July 28, 2015	The Arena in San Juan	San Beda	85–61	(Note: San Beda had a 5-0 record prior to the game.)
22	September 10, 2015	The Arena in San Juan	San Beda	109–53	(Note: San Beda won in the finals against Arellano.)
23	2016	The Arena in San Juan	San Beda	95–63	
24	2016	The Arena in San Juan	San Beda	93–81	(Note: San Beda had a 12-0 record prior to the game. San Beda lost in the finals against Malayan.)
25	2017	UPHSD Gym	San Beda	90–79	(Note: NCAA on Tour.)
26	2017	The Arena in San Juan	San Beda	87–66	(Note: San Beda lost to LSGH in the semifinals.)
27	2018	The Arena in San Juan	Perpetual	72–69	(Note: First elimination round win of Perpetual against San Beda in years.)
28	2018	The Arena in San Juan	Perpetual	71–67	(Note: Perpetual swept San Beda in the elimination round. San Beda–Rizal lost to Malayan in the semifinals.)
29	2019	The Arena in San Juan	San Beda	95–76	
30	2019	The Arena in San Juan	San Beda	100–97	(Note: San Beda won in the finals against Lyceum-Cavite.)
31	2023	Emilio Aguinaldo College Gym	San Beda	96–87	
32	February 21, 2024	Filoil EcoOil Centre	Perpetual	78–56	
33	March 2, 2025	Emilio Aguinaldo College Gym	San Beda	83–80	(Note: San Beda gave Perpetual its only elimination round loss.)
34	April 7, 2025^	Filoil EcoOil Centre	Perpetual	96–87	(Note: Perpetual won in the finals against LSGH.)
35	October 30, 2025	Playtime Filoil Centre	Perpetual	75–66^{OT}	
36	October 8, 2026	Playtime Filoil Centre	Perpetual	72–60	
Series: San Beda leads 30–6
(*) = finals games; (^) = semifinals; (≠) = seeding playoffs

=== Final Four Rankings ===
For comparison, these are the rankings of these two teams since the Final Four format was introduced.

==== Seniors' division ====
Team ╲ Year	1997	1998	1999	2000	2001	2002	2003	2004	2005	2006	2007	2008	2009	2010	2011	2012	2013	2014	2015	2016	2017	2018	2019	2020	2021 (Note: 2021-22 season was played in early 2022 and the tournament was held in into a round robin tournament instead of the usual double round eliminations.)	2022	2023	2024
San Beda	2	4	5	6	8	7	6	4	7	1	1	1	1	1	1	1	1	1	1	1	2	1	1	C	3	4	3	3
Perpetual	5	3	3	2	7	8	7	1	5	5	6	8	9	8	9	4	4	4	6	4	9	4	7	C	4	8	5	8

==== Juniors' division ====
Team ╲ Year	1997	1998	1999	2000	2001	2002	2003	2004	2005	2006	2007	2008	2009	2010	2011	2012	2013	2014	2015	2016	2017	2018	2019	2020	2021	2022	2023 (Note: 2023-24 season was played in early 2024 and the tournament was held in into a round robin tournament instead of the usual double round eliminations.)
San Beda		2	1	2	2	1	1	1	2	3	3	5	1	1	1	1	1	2	1	1	1	3	1	C	C	2	5
Perpetual									6	6	6	6	5	3	9	8	7	9	10	7	7	6	8	C	C	6	1

Legend * Number denotes playoff seeding. Shade denotes final position.
Finished as the champion
Finished as the 1st runner-up
Finished as semifinalist
Lost in 4th-seed playoff
Twice to beat advantage
C Tournament cancelled

== Volleyball Statistics ==
Perpetual and San Beda competed at the NCAA Men's Volleyball Finals in Seasons 87 and 98.

=== Men's volleyball results ===
San Beda victories	Perpetual victories

No.	Date	Location	Winner	Score	Note/s
1	August 7, 2005	Philippine Christian University Gym	San Beda	3–0	
2	2005	Philippine Christian University Gym	San Beda	3–0	
3	2006		Perpetual	3–0	
4	2008	Saint Placid's Gym	San Beda	3–0	
5	2010^	Emilio Aguinaldo College Gym	San Beda	3–0	(Note: Semifinals. San Beda lost to Letran in the Finals.)
6	2011		Perpetual	3–0	
7	2011^		Perpetual	3–0	(Note: Semifinals. Perpetual defeated Arellano in the finals.)
8	January 13, 2012	Emilio Aguinaldo College Gym	Perpetual	1–0	
9	January 27, 2012	Ninoy Aquino Stadium	Perpetual	3–2	
10	February 3, 2012*	Ninoy Aquino Stadium	Perpetual	3–0	(Note: Finals Game 1.)
11	February 6, 2012*	Ninoy Aquino Stadium	Perpetual	3–0	(Note: Finals Game 2. Perpetual wins its 7th men's volleyball championship.)
12	January 25, 2013	Filoil Flying V Arena	Perpetual	3–0	
13	February 7, 2013^	Filoil Flying V Arena	Perpetual	3–0	(Note: Semifinals. Perpetual defeated EAC in the finals.)
14	January 6, 2014	Filoil Flying V Arena	Perpetual	3–0	
15	2014^	Filoil Flying V Arena	Perpetual	3–0	
16	December 12, 2014	Filoil Flying V Arena	Perpetual	3–0	

No.	Date	Location	Winner	Score	Note/s
17	2017	Filoil Flying V Arena	San Beda	3–2	(Note: San Beda gave Perpetual its only elimination round loss of the season.)
18	January 31, 2017^	Filoil Flying V Arena	Perpetual	3–2	(Note: Semifinals. Perpetual eliminated San Beda.)
19	2018	Filoil Flying V Arena	Perpetual	3–0	
20	2019	Filoil Flying V Arena	Perpetual	3–0	
21	February 7, 2020	Filoil Flying V Arena	Perpetual	3–0	
22	March 10, 2023	San Andres Sports Complex	Perpetual	3–1	
23	April 11, 2023*	Filoil EcoOil Centre	Perpetual	3–0	(Note: Finals Game 1.)
24	April 14, 2023*	Filoil EcoOil Centre	San Beda	3–2	(Note: Finals Game 2. San Beda gave Perpetual its first loss of the season and tied the series.)
25	April 16, 2023*	Filoil EcoOil Centre	Perpetual	3–0	(Note: Finals Game 3. Perpetual wins its 13th men's volleyball championship.)
26	April 23, 2024	Filoil EcoOil Centre	Perpetual	3–0	
27	February 22, 2025	SSC–R Gym	Perpetual	3–0	(Note: Opening game.)
28	May 28, 2025	Filoil EcoOil Centre	Perpetual	3–2	
29	February 22, 2026	San Andres Sports Complex	Perpetual	3–0	
Series: Perpetual leads 23–6
(*) = finals games; (^) = semifinals; (≠) = seeding playoffs

=== Women's volleyball results ===
San Beda victories	Perpetual victories	Forfeits

No.	Date	Location	Winner	Score	Note/s
1	2008	Saint Placid's Gym	Perpetual	3–0	
2	2008	Saint Placid's Gym	Perpetual	3–0	
3	2010	Emilio Aguinaldo College Gym	San Beda	3–0	
4	2011		Perpetual	3–0	(Note: The semifinals in the women's division was restarted after the league forfeited all the games that April Ann Sartin and Ronnery dela Cruz of Perpetual Help and Arianne Yap and Janel Lim of St. Benilde played for eligibility violations. CSB's and Perpetual's games during the elimination round were also forfeited.)
5	2012	Filoil Flying V Arena	Perpetual	3–0	(Note: Perpetual had a 7–0 record prior to the game.)
6	January 25, 2013	Filoil Flying V Arena	Perpetual	3–0	
7	January 6, 2014		Perpetual	3–1	
8	December 12, 2014	Filoil Flying V Arena	Perpetual	3–0	
9	2016	Filoil Flying V Arena	Perpetual	3–0	(Note: Perpetual lost to Benilde in the Stepladder round 1.)
10	2017	Filoil Flying V Arena	San Beda	3–1	(Note: San Beda lost to Benilde in the Stepladder round 1.)
11	2018	Filoil Flying V Arena	San Beda	3–0	

No.	Date	Location	Winner	Score	Note/s
12	February 9, 2018^	Filoil Flying V Arena	San Beda	3–0	(Note: Semifinals, San Beda with twice-to-beat advantage. San Beda lost to Arellano in the finals.)
13	2019	Filoil Flying V Arena	San Beda	3–2	(Note: San Beda and Perpetual lost to Arellano in the semifinals and finals, respectively.)
14	February 7, 2020	Filoil Flying V Arena	San Beda	3–0	
15	March 10, 2023	San Andres Sports Complex	Perpetual	3–0	(Note: Perpetual lost to Lyceum in the Second round stepladder.)
16	April 23, 2024	Filoil EcoOil Centre	Perpetual	3–2	
17	February 22, 2025	SSC–R Gym	Perpetual	3–0	(Note: Opening game.)
18	May 28, 2025	Filoil EcoOil Centre	San Beda	3–1	
19	February 22, 2026	San Andres Sports Complex	Perpetual	3–2	
20	April 8, 2026≠	Rizal Memorial Coliseum	#3 Perpetual	3–0	(Note: Third place playoff.)
Series: Perpetual leads 12–8
(*) = finals games; (^) = semifinals; (≠) = seeding playoffs

== See also ==
- San Beda Red Lions
- National Collegiate Athletic Association (Philippines)
- San Beda–Letran rivalry
- Arellano–San Beda rivalry
- San Beda–San Sebastian rivalry
- Battle of Intramuros
- San Sebastian–Letran rivalry
- JRU–San Sebastian rivalry
- Arellano-Perpetual rivalry
