= NCAA Season 84 basketball tournaments =

NCAA Season 84
- Host school: Mapúa Institute of Technology
Men's Finals	G1	G2	G3	Wins
San Beda Red Lions	72	60	85	2
JRU Heavy Bombers	68	62	69	1
- Duration: September 24–29, 2008
- Arena(s): Araneta Coliseum
- Finals MVP: Sam Ekwe
- Winning coach: Frankie Lim (2nd title)
- Semifinalists: Letran Knights; Mapúa Cardinals
- TV network(s): Studio 23
Juniors' Finals	G1	G2	Wins
San Sebastian Staglets	83	77	2
Letran Squires	81	70	0
- Duration: September 24–26, 2008
- Arena(s): Araneta Coliseum
- Finals MVP: Arvie Bringas
- Winning coach: Raymond Valenzona (4th title)
- Semifinalists: JRU Light Bombers; La Salle Green Hills Greenies
- TV network(s): Studio 23

The basketball tournaments of National Collegiate Athletic Association (Philippines) 84th season hosted by the Mapúa Institute of Technology began on June 28 at the Araneta Coliseum with Metropolitan Manila Development Authority chairman Bayani Fernando as the keynote speaker (however, Fernando was later tasked to lead the cleanup efforts caused by Typhoon Frank, he sent his daughter instead). All subsequent elimination round games will be held at Cuneta Astrodome. The theme of the season is "To The Fore at 84".

The games began on June 28 at the Araneta Coliseum, Quezon City with a quadruple-header.

The first two games along with men's games every Wednesday and Friday will be aired on Studio 23. The remaining elimination round games were at the Cuneta Astrodome at Pasay, except for the last game which was held at the Araneta Coliseum.

The San Beda Red Lions and the San Sebastian Staglets both defended their titles successfully, with the Red Lions winning against the JRU Heavy Bombers in three games and the Staglets sweeping the elimination round and their finals series against the Letran Squires. San Beda is now the three-time champion while San Sebastian won their fourth consecutive title.

== New rules ==
The NCAA Policy Board approved two new rule changes concerning the basketball events:

- The "challenge" rule: A head coach can challenge a three-point shot to the referee via the use of a video replay; if the challenge is revoked, the team is charged with a timeout or assessed with a technical foul if it has no timeouts left.
- Hand check fouls will be disallowed.
- Fouls away from the ball during inbounds would result in automatic unsportsmanlike fouls.

== Men's tournament ==
=== Teams ===
Team	College	Coach
Letran Knights	Colegio de San Juan de Letran (CSJL)	(Philippines) Louie Alas
Benilde Blazers	De La Salle–College of Saint Benilde (CSB)	(Philippines) Gee Abanilla
JRU Heavy Bombers	José Rizal University (JRU)	(Philippines) Ariel Vanguardia
Mapúa Cardinals	Mapúa Institute of Technology (MIT)	(Philippines) Leo Isaac
PCU Dolphins	Philippine Christian University (PCU)	(Philippines) Joel Dualan
San Beda Red Lions	San Beda College (SBC)	(Philippines) Frankie Lim
San Sebastian Stags	San Sebastian College – Recoletos (SSC-R)	(Philippines) Jorge Gallent
Perpetual Altas	University of Perpetual Help System DALTA (UPHSD)	(Philippines) Bai Cristobal

==== Changes from last season ====
Returning from suspension:

- PCU Dolphins

=== Preseason ===
With Caloy Garcia leaving the team and being elevated to the head coach position at Welcoat Dragons, Red Bull Barako assistant coach Gee Abanilla was tapped in as the new Benilde Blazers coach for the 84th season. Abanilla coached the Barakos for a few wins while head coach Yeng Guiao was away on the campaign trail at the 2007 election.

=== Elimination round ===
==== Team standings ====
Pos	Team	W	L	PCT	GB	Qualification
1	San Beda Red Lions (Note: San Beda forfeited their first round win against Benilde when one of their players wore the wrong uniform.)	11	3	.786	—	Twice-to-beat in the semifinals
2	JRU Heavy Bombers	9	5	.643 (Note: Head-to-head record: San Sebastian 4–2, Mapúa 3–3, Letran 3–3 (Mapúa 1–1 Letran, Mapúa +10), JRU 2–4; classification playoffs: JRU 57–53, Letran 62–52 Mapúa, fourth-seed playoff: Mapúa 63–54 San Sebastian; second-seed playoff: JRU 69–53 Letran)	2	Twice-to-beat in the semifinals
3	Letran Knights	9	5	.643	2	Twice-to-win in the semifinals
4	Mapúa Cardinals (H)	9	5	.643	2	Twice-to-win in the semifinals
5	San Sebastian Stags	9	5	.643	2	
6	Benilde Blazers	4	10	.286	7	
7	PCU Dolphins	3	11	.214	8	
8	Perpetual Altas	2	12	.143	9	

Source: ABS-CBN Sports
Rules for classification: 1) winning percentage; 2) if tied for top 4, one-game playoff; 3) head-to-head record; 4) head-to-head goal average; 5) overall point differential
(H) Hosts

==== Match-up results ====
	Round 1							Round 2						
Team ╲ Game	1	2	3	4	5	6	7	8	9	10	11	12	13	14
Letran	JRU school colors	CSB school colors	PCU school colors	SSC-R school colors	UPHD school colors	Mapua school colors	San Beda school colors	CSB school colors	JRU school colors	SSC-R school colors	UPHD school colors	Mapua school colors	PCU school colors	San Beda school colors
Benilde	PCU school colors	UPHD school colors	Letran school colors	JRU school colors	Mapua school colors	San Beda school colors	SSC-R school colors	Letran school colors	JRU school colors	PCU school colors	Mapua school colors	San Beda school colors	SSC-R school colors	UPHD school colors
JRU	Letran school colors	SSC-R school colors	CSB school colors	UPHD school colors	San Beda school colors	Mapua school colors	PCU school colors	UPHD school colors	CSB school colors	Letran school colors	San Beda school colors	SSC-R school colors	PCU school colors	Mapua school colors
Mapúa	San Beda school colors	SSC-R school colors	PCU school colors	UPHD school colors	CSB school colors	Letran school colors	JRU school colors	SSC-R school colors	San Beda school colors	CSB school colors	PCU school colors	Letran school colors	UPHD school colors	JRU school colors
PCU	CSB school colors	Mapua school colors	San Beda school colors	Letran school colors	UPHD school colors	SSC-R school colors	JRU school colors	SSC-R school colors	San Beda school colors	CSB school colors	UPHD school colors	Mapua school colors	JRU school colors	Letran school colors
San Beda	Mapua school colors	PCU school colors	SSC-R school colors	CSB school colors	UPHD school colors	JRU school colors	Letran school colors	PCU school colors	Mapua school colors	UPHD school colors	JRU school colors	CSB school colors	SSC-R school colors	Letran school colors
San Sebastian	UPHD school colors	Mapua school colors	JRU school colors	San Beda school colors	Letran school colors	PCU school colors	CSB school colors	PCU school colors	Mapua school colors	UPHD school colors	Letran school colors	JRU school colors	CSB school colors	San Beda school colors
Perpetual	SSC-R school colors	CSB school colors	Mapua school colors	PCU school colors	JRU school colors	Letran school colors	San Beda school colors	JRU school colors	SSC-R school colors	San Beda school colors	PCU school colors	Letran school colors	CSB school colors	Mapua school colors

= Win; = OT win; = Loss; = OT loss

=== Scores ===
Team	CSJL	CSB	JRU	MIT	PCU	SBC	SSC-R	UPHSD
Letran Knights		88–75	83–69	67–60	73–62	67–71	71–67	63–62
Benilde Blazers	65–90		67–75	57–63	69–65	20–0 (Note: San Beda originally won 74–51. Benilde put the game under protest as San Beda player Samuel Ekwe wore a different uniform from the one that was approved by the NCAA. The NCAA Management Committee upheld Benilde's protest and awarded them a forfeit win.)	48–65	61–54
JRU Heavy Bombers	76–72	87–60		68–52	60–58	79–74	54–57	74–57
Mapúa Cardinals	69–52	56–66	72–61		77–71	56–85	86–80	76–65
PCU Dolphins	54–60	63–47	59–74	60–63		63–72	64–71	65–61
San Beda Red Lions	65–63*	91–74	71–59	48–53	72–67		84–83*	70–48
San Sebastian Stags	76–73	51–58	52–47	64–62	62–58	58–62		55–60
Perpetual Altas	66–74	75–65*	48–51	51–75	51–59	55–72	36–68	

Legend: Blue = left column team win; Red = top row team win.
Matches with lighter background shading were decided after overtime.

=== Postseason teams ===
==== San Beda Red Lions ====
The defending champions opened the season with a 29-point blowout against season host Mapua; it seems another championship run by San Beda as they won 5 consecutive victories, including an overtime thriller against San Sebastian. However, CSB put their game against San Beda under protest as Sam Ekwe donned last year's uniform. The NCAA Management Committee ruled in favor of CSB, on the same day JRU used their outside shooting to shock San Beda giving them two losses in one day.

The Red Lions recovered with a win against their marquee game against Letran and PCU but Mapua gave their own version of an upset when they used slow ball against the Red Lions to win the game. San Beda recovered with wins against Perpetual, revenge against both CSB and JRU and another close game against San Sebastian. The Red Lions capped off the elimination round as the #1 seed by sending Letran to the classification round for 2nd-4th places after Borgie Hermida scored on a buzzer-beaten to make them win the game in overtime at the Araneta Coliseum.

==== Letran Knights ====
Letran won the first six games of the season, including a come-from-behind win against UPHSD, but faltered in the first round finale against San Beda in which the ball slipped from Reymar Gutilban's hands to land at the end lines in the dying seconds. After a win against CSB, Letran lost the next two games against JRU and San Sebastian. After a win against also-ran UPHSD, Mapua whipped the Knights in the Battle of Intramuros despite not scoring a field-goal in the fourth quarter.

Continuing the pattern, Letran beat PCU in their last NCAA game since they'll take a leave of absence. In the elimination round finale, Letran was on the verge of winning a twice-to-beat advantage but a game went into overtime. In the extra period, Letran was leading by 4 points when San Beda rallied to lead by two. RJ Jazul scored on a driving lay-up with 5 seconds remaining but Borgie Hermida scored a buzzer-beater with a looper from the free-throw line to seal San Beda's third straight semifinal appearance with the twice to beat advantage. Letran now had to go through a series of games to determine if they'll qualify for the Final Four.

==== JRU Heavy Bombers ====
The Bombers were blown out by Letran on opening day and were beaten by San Sebastian in the closing minutes in their second game. The Heavy Bombers regrouped and won their next eight games, including an upset against San Beda where they capitalized on their streaky three-point shooting. Ironically it was San Beda that finished the streak when they had a decisive run in the fourth quarter to prevent a JRU comeback.

San Sebastian continued their mastery of the Bombers with another win against them. After a win against PCU, JRU had an outside chance of clinching a twice to beat advantage provided they beat Mapua which was on a must-win situation. The Cardinals were riding on a three-game winning streak and capitalized on the momentum to force three teams tied with 9-5 records; with the loss of Letran against San Beda, those four teams would undergo a series of games to determine which teams will clinch the nos. 2 to 4 seeds.

==== Mapua Cardinals ====
Mapua was blown away by the Red Lions on opening day with a 29-point drubbing, but the Cardinals recovered by winning their next 3 games in a span of a week. After a win against CSB, Letran won the first Battle of Intramuros, and they were beaten by JRU and San Sebastian. Mapua dealt San Beda their only loss in the second round with a slow-down game in which they took a shot at the very end of the shot clock to throw off the Red Lions' fast-paced game, with Kelvin dela Peña proclaiming on the post-game interview that they're back.

The Cardinals were dealt with a disappointing loss against the also-ran CSB Blazers, and they had to win all of their games to force a tie for the last qualifying berth. With them winning all of their games, including the second Battle of Intramuros, and a do-or-die game against JRU in their last game of the eliminations, the Cardinals forced a four-way tie for #2.

The Cardinals became the only team to beat the Red Lions twice this season, with two consecutive win in the second round and the first game of their semifinals match-up.

==== San Sebastian Golden Stags ====
San Sebastian lost its first two games against UPHSD and Mapua, but the Stags emerged victorious against JRU in their third game. After losing to the Red Lions, they didn't lose their faith in nothing more than joining the final four this season and "reliving the glory days" (their consecutive domination in the 90's) as they started their 8 winning streak against PCU and CSB at the end of the first round and extending their run in the second round as they beat PCU for the second time dethroning the Mapua Cardinals at the number 4 spot, revenge on both UPHSD and Letran and then defeating both JRU and CSB. They lost again to the San Beda Red Lions in a close match. Ending at 9-5 did not assure them of a final four seat even if they finished one match earlier than Mapúa, JRU and Letran as they lost against JRU and losing again to Mapúa in the Head-to-Head match for the final four. Even if the stags was granted the #2 seed in the face-off match, they were not able to enter the final four in the season 84.

San Sebastian were the only team to win against JRU Heavy Bombers in the Elimination Round. Sharing with the said team the highest winning streak of 8 matches.

=== Seeding playoffs ===
After a tight race for the final four, it was announced that the Management Committee will meet to determine how to break the ties.

After the games of September 5, it was decided that the system used by FIBA would be used to break ties and assign seedings.

After San Beda's win against Letran, four teams were tied from 2nd to 5th, with only 4 teams advancing to the semifinals. The four teams were ranked on the basis of their head-to-head records.

The four teams will then undergo a mini-tournament to determine the 2nd, 3rd and 4th seeds. The winners of the first round will meet to decide the 2nd seed (a de facto best of three series) while the losers will meet to decide the 4th seed. The loser of that game will be eliminated from contention while the winner will face San Beda in the semifinals.

==== Bracket ====
First round
San Sebastian	53
JRU	57
Mapúa	52
Letran	62

Second seed playoff
JRU	69
Letran	53
Fourth seed playoff
San Sebastian	54
Mapúa	63

==== First round ====
The winners advance to the second seed playoff, while the losers proceed to the fourth seed playoff.

Studio 23

September 15
2:00 p.m.

San Sebastian Stags	53–57	JRU Heavy Bombers
Scoring by quarter: 11–15, 12–19, 10–9, 20–14
Pts: Froilan Saquillo 16; Rebs: Jason Ballesteros 11		Pts: James Sena 11; Rebs: Jayson Nocom 8

Cuneta Astrodome, Pasay

Studio 23

September 15
4:00 p.m.

Mapúa Cardinals	52–62	Letran Knights
Scoring by quarter: 13–21, 9–8, 23–20, 7–13
Pts: Allan Mangahas 13		Pts: Dino Daa 24

Cuneta Astrodome, Pasay

==== Second seed playoff ====
The winner gets the twice-to-beat advantage against its opponent in the semifinals.

Studio 23

September 17
4:00 p.m.

Letran Knights	53–69	JRU Heavy Bombers
Scoring by quarter: 11–25, 9–14, 18–17, 15–13
Pts: Cortez, Jazul, 9 each Rebs: Dino Daa 11		Pts: James Sena 15; Rebs: James Sena 11
JRU wins the twice to beat advantage

Cuneta Astrodome, Pasay

==== Fourth seed playoff ====
The winner faces San Beda wins the twice-to-win disadvantage, while the loser is eliminated.

Studio 23

September 17
2:00 p.m.

San Sebastian Stags	54–63	Mapúa Cardinals
Scoring by quarter: 7–13, 19–12, 2–24, 26–14
Pts: Jim Bruce Viray 11		Pts: Neil Pascual 17
Mapúa advances to the Final Four

Cuneta Astrodome, Pasay

=== Bracket ===
Semifinals (Top 2 twice-to-beat)
1	San Beda	51	60
4	Mapúa	53	53
2	JRU	63
3	Letran	61

Finals (Best-of-three playoff)
1	San Beda	72	60	85
2	JRU	68	62	69

=== Semifinals ===
San Beda and JRU have the twice-to-beat advantage. They only have to win once, while their opponents, twice, to progress.

==== (1) San Beda vs. (4) Mapua ====
Studio 23

September 19
2:00 p.m.

San Beda Red Lions	51–53	Mapúa Cardinals
Scoring by quarter: 9–18, 13–15, 16–12, 13–8
Pts: Rogemar Menor 18		Pts: Kelvin dela Peña 17

Cuneta Astrodome, Pasay

Studio 23

September 22
2:30 p.m.

San Beda Red Lions	60–53	Mapúa Cardinals
Scoring by quarter: 22–16, 6–17, 16–8, 16–12
Pts: Rogemar Menor 17; Rebs: Ekwe, Pascual, 13 each		Pts: Kelvin dela Peña 12; Rebs: Neil Pascual 9
San Beda wins series in two games

Cuneta Astrodome, Pasay

San Beda and Mapua exchange leads until late in the 4th quarter in which Mapua led 51-38 when San Beda had a 13-2 run until the last 12.5 seconds. Ian Mazo turned the ball over for Mapua which led to San Beda taking a last crack at the basket; after the time out, Pong Escobal missed a hurried three-pointer and Mapua extended the series to a deciding second game.

Mapua would run out of gas in the second game as San Beda coach Frankie Lim observed that they were tired after an extended playoff run; although they gave the Red Lions a fight, a shot by Ogie Menor in the final 1:10 put the game out of reach for the Red Lions to clinch their finals berth.

==== (2) JRU vs. (3) Letran ====
Studio 23

September 19
4:00 p.m.

JRU Heavy Bombers	63–61	Letran Knights
Scoring by quarter: 24–15, 8–20, 16–13, 15–13
Pts: James Sena 13; Rebs: James Sena 11		Pts: RJ Jazul 17; Rebs: RJ Jazul 4
JRU wins series in one game

Cuneta Astrodome, Pasay

With Letran up by three in the final 1:43, John Melegrito turned the ball over for a John Wilson lay-up. Mark Cagoco's defense caused RJ Jazul to turn the ball over anew, and James Sena scored in the next possession to put JRU up for good. Marvin Hayes helped in defending Jazul to force another turnover; Jazul fouled Cagoco to stop the clock. As Cagoco split his free throws, Jazul has a last chance to tie the game but Wilson blocked his shot as time expired, leading JRU to their first finals series since 2001.

=== Finals ===
Studio 23

September 24
4:00 p.m.

San Beda Red Lions	72–68	JRU Heavy Bombers
Scoring by quarter: 19-18, 20-13, 16-19, 17-18
Pts: Pong Escobal 15; Rebs: Sam Ekwe 16; Asts: Pong Escobal 5		Pts: James Sena 19; Rebs: Marvin Hayes 11; Asts: Mark Cagoco 7

Araneta Coliseum, Quezon City
Attendance: 15,318

Studio 23

September 26
4:00 p.m.

San Beda Red Lions	60–62	JRU Heavy Bombers
Scoring by quarter: 14-19, 14-11, 16-15, 16-17
Pts: Pong Escobal 16; Rebs: Sam Ekwe 13; Asts: Borgie Hermida 4		Pts: Jayson Nocom 16; Rebs: James Sena 9 Asts: James Sena 5

Araneta Coliseum, Quezon City
Attendance: 19,292

Studio 23

September 29
3:00 p.m.

San Beda Red Lions	85–69	JRU Heavy Bombers
Scoring by quarter: 24-12, 14-17, 26-19, 21-21
Pts: Sam Ekwe 20; Rebs: Sam Ekwe 19; Asts: Pong Escobal 9		Pts: James Sena 24; Rebs: Nchotu Njei 7 Asts: JR Bulangis 6
San Beda wins series, 2–1

Araneta Coliseum, Quezon City
Attendance: 20,360

- Finals Most Valuable Player: Samuel Ekwe (San Beda Red Lions)

=== Controversies ===
==== Wrong uniform ====
San Beda's Sam Ekwe wore a different uniform in San Beda's 71-54 victory against CSB; he instead wore the 2007 uniform. As a result, CSB filed a protest that could overturn San Beda's victory. The Management Committee reversed San Beda's win against CSB on a decision released on July 23, awarding CSB the victory.

=== Awards ===
NCAA Season 84 men's basketball champions
San Beda Red Lions
14th title, third consecutive title

The season's awardees were awarded at halftime of the first game of the finals series. They are:

- Most Valuable Player: Sam Ekwe (San Beda Red Lions)
- Rookie of the Year: Allan Mangahas (Mapúa Cardinals)
- Mythical team:
  - Sam Ekwe (San Beda Red Lions)
  - Jason Ballesteros (San Sebastian Stags)
  - Marvin Hayes (JRU Heavy Bombers)
  - Neil Pascual (Mapúa Cardinals)
  - RJ Jazul (Letran Knights)
- Defensive Player of the Year:Jason Ballesteros (San Sebastian Stags)
- Players of the week:
  - June 28-July 6: RJ Jazul (Letran)
  - July 7–14: Kelvin dela Peña (Mapúa)
  - July 15–21: Pong Escobal (San Beda)
  - July 22–28: James Sena (JRU)
  - July 29-August 5: Sam Ekwe (San Beda)
  - August 6–13: Jason Ballesteros (San Sebastian)
  - August 14–20: James Sena (JRU)

== Juniors' tournament ==
Games began on June 30 at the Cuneta Astrodome at Pasay.

=== Elimination round ===
SSC-R's sweep
Opponent	Score
UPHD	88-61
MHSS	119-25
JRU	89-65
San Beda	77-73*
Letran	79-70
LSGH	71-65
MHSS	101-30
UPHD	99-61
Letran	88-80
LSGH	83-65
San Beda	60-43
JRU	97-88*
*Overtime
Offense	87.58
Defense	60.50
Margin	+27.08

Keith Agovida of JRU broke the NCAA scoring record of 70 points held by Letran's Marlon Bola Bola; as he scored 82 points in JRU's 127-49 rout of Malayan Science.

It was the first time in NCAA history that the San Beda Red Cubs failed to enter the Final Four round and was also the first time that a team had swept the eliminations since 2000. The San Sebastian Staglets therefore advanced to the finals automatically.

==== Team standings ====
Pos	Team	W	L	PCT	GB	Qualification
1	San Sebastian Staglets	12	0	1.000	—	Advance to the Finals (Note: As San Sebastian won all of their elimination round games, the stepladder format will be used instead of the regular Final Four format.)
2	Letran Squires	9	3	.750	3	Proceed to stepladder round 2
3	JRU Light Bombers	7	5	.583 (Note: Head-to-head record: JRU 1–1 (+24) LSGH)	5	Proceed to stepladder round 1
4	La Salle Green Hills Greenies	7	5	.583	5	Proceed to stepladder round 1
5	San Beda Red Cubs	5	7	.417	7	
6	Perpetual Altalettes	2	10	.167	10	
7	Mapúa Red Robins (H)	0	12	.000	12	

Source: ABS-CBN Sports
Rules for classification: 1) winning percentage; 2) if tied for top 4, one-game playoff; 3) head-to-head record; 4) head-to-head point differential; 5) overall point differential
(H) Hosts

==== Rivalry games ====
June 30

Mapúa Red Robins	33–104	San Beda Red Cubs

Cuneta Astrodome, Pasay

August 13

San Beda Red Cubs	96–35	Mapúa Red Robins

Cuneta Astrodome, Pasay

July 14

San Beda Red Cubs	73–77 (OT)	San Sebastian Staglets

Cuneta Astrodome, Pasay

September 3

San Beda Red Cubs	43–60	San Sebastian Staglets

Cuneta Astrodome, Pasay

July 30

San Beda Red Cubs	77–91	Letran Squires

Cuneta Astrodome, Pasay

September 5

Letran Squires	65–61	San Beda Red Cubs

Cuneta Astrodome, Pasay

=== Bracket ===
Stepladder round 1 (Single-elimination)
3	JRU	95*
4	LSGH	89

Stepladder round 2 (Single-elimination)
2	Letran	94
3	JRU	93

Finals (Best-of-three playoff)
1	San Sebastian	83	77
2	Letran	81	70

*Overtime

=== Stepladder semifinals ===
==== (3) JRU vs. (4) LSGH ====
September 15

JRU Light Bombers	95–89 (OT)	La Salle Green Hills Greenies

Cuneta Astrodome, Pasay

==== (2) Letran vs. (3) JRU ====
September 17

Letran Squires	94–93	JRU Light Bombers

Cuneta Astrodome, Pasay

=== Finals ===
Studio 23

September 24

San Sebastian Staglets	83–81	Letran Squires

Araneta Coliseum, Quezon City

Studio 23

September 26

San Sebastian Staglets	77–70	Letran Squires
San Sebastian wins series, 2–0

Araneta Coliseum, Quezon City

- Finals Most Valuable Player: Arvie Bringas (San Sebastian Staglets)

=== Awards ===
NCAA Season 84 juniors' basketball champions
San Sebastian Staglets
Fifth title, fourth consecutive title

- Most Valuable Player: Keith Agovida (JRU Light Bombers)
- Rookie of the Year: Jarelan Tampus (Letran Squires)
- Mythical team:
  - Keith Agovida (JRU Light Bombers)
  - Arvie Bringas (San Sebastian Staglets)
  - Jarelan Tampus (Letran Squires)
  - Martin Reyes (La Salle Green Hills Greenies)
  - Glenn Khobuntin (Letran Squires)
- Defensive Player of the Year: Keith Agovida (JRU Light Bombers)

== Broadcast notes ==
ABS-CBN's UHF channel Studio 23 is the sole coverer of the games, covering all men's games since opening day held on a Wednesday and Friday (except for the last two games on opening day). 101.9 For Life!, ABS-CBN's FM radio station, delivers updates on game dates.

NCAA College Hoops airs every Monday afternoons as a supplement for the main NCAA coverage. It is hosted by Andrei Felix and San Beda courtside reporter Pia Boren.

Playoff broadcasters are:

Game	Play-by-play	Analyst	Courtside reporters
JRU-San Sebastian playoff	Andrei Felix	Allan Gregorio	Cassie Umali and Carla Rivera
Letran-Mapua playoff	Bill Velasco	Butch Maniego	Meg Punzalan and Jean King
Fourth-seed game	Andrei Felix	Butch Maniego	Carla Rivera and Jean King
Second-seed game	Bill Velasco	Allan Gregorio	Meg Punzalan and Cassie Umali
San Beda-Mapua semifinal game 1	Bill Velasco	Allan Gregorio	Pia Boren and Jean King
JRU-Letran semifinal	Andrei Felix	Butch Maniego	Cassie Umali and Meg Punzalan
San Beda-Mapua semifinal game 2	Bill Velasco	Allan Gregorio	Pia Boren and Jean King
Juniors' Finals Game 1	Andrei Felix	Jude Roque	Carla Rivera and Meg Punzalan
Men's Finals Game 1	Bill Velasco	Butch Maniego	Pia Boren and Cassie Umali
Juniors' Finals Game 2	Andrei Felix	Jude Roque	Carla Rivera and Meg Punzalan
Men's Finals Game 2	Bill Velasco	Allan Gregorio	Pia Boren and Cassie Umali
Men's Finals Game 3	Bill Velasco	Allan Gregorio	Pia Boren and Cassie Umali

== Champion rosters ==
=== San Beda Red Lions ===
Note: Flags indicate national team eligibility at FIBA sanctioned events. Players may hold other non-FIBA nationality not displayed.

No.		Position	Player
	(Philippines)	C	David Marcelo
	(Philippines)	C	Elvin Jake Pascual
	(Philippines)	F	Eduardo Canlas
	(Philippines)	F	Ginno Soliman
	(Philippines)	F	Jerome Villanueva
5	(Philippines)	G	Chico Tirona
4	(Philippines)	F	Chris Taupa
6	(Philippines)	G	Riego Gamalinda
7	(Philippines)	G	Garvo Lanete
8	(Philippines)	F	Eduardo Tecson Jr.
13	(Nigeria)	C	Samuel Ekwe
14	(Philippines)	C	Jay-R Taganas
15	(Philippines)	F	Ogie Menor
16	(Philippines)	G	Borgie Hermida
18	(Philippines)	G	Pong Escobal
Position			Name/s
Head coach:			(Philippines) Frankie Lim
				San Beda Red Lions

=== San Sebastian Staglets ===
Note: Flags indicate national team eligibility at FIBA sanctioned events. Players may hold other non-FIBA nationality not displayed.

No.		Position	Player
	(Philippines)	G	Almond Vosotros
	(Philippines)	G	Eris Mendoza
	(Philippines)	G	Jeic Estrada
	(Philippines)	G	Jhon Rhey Villarosa
	(Philippines)	F	Joel Laconico
	(Philippines)	G	John Trinidad
4	(Philippines)	F	Raffy Gusi
9	(Philippines)	F	Jon Ortuoste
10	(Philippines)	C	Kenneth Mamaril
12	(Philippines)	G	Fritz Delgado
14	(Philippines)	F	Marco Cam
15	(Philippines)	F	Fritz Delgado
16	(Philippines)	F	Arvie Bringas
19	(Philippines)	C	Yutien Andrada
Position			Name/s
Head coach:			(Philippines) Raymond Valenzona
				San Sebastian Staglets

== See also ==
- UAAP Season 71 basketball tournaments
- 2008 Philippine Collegiate Championship

Preceded by Season 83 (2007)	NCAA basketball seasons Season 84 (2008)	Succeeded by Season 85 (2009)
