= San Beda–San Sebastian rivalry =

Rivalry between the two teams

San Beda–San Sebastian men's basketball rivalry
- San Beda Red Lions San Sebastian Golden Stags
- Sport: Men's basketball
- Latest meeting: October 2, 2026 (Playtime Filoil Centre, San Juan); San Beda, 85–55
- Next meeting: TBA

Statistics
- All-time record: NCAA Final Four (Philippines) appearances: San Beda 20; San Sebastian 15; Titles: San Beda: NCAA 23; San Sebastian: NCAA 12
- Longest win streak: San Beda, 11 (2017–2023)
- Current win streak: San Beda, 2 (2025–present)

Locations of San Beda (red) and San Sebastian (gold).

This rivalry is between Recto's San Sebastian and Mendiola's San Beda. The rivalry is played at the National Collegiate Athletic Association (Philippines).

== Head-to-head record by sport ==
=== Seniors' Division ===
==== General Championship ====
San Beda has 6 General Championships while San Sebastian has 4 in the General Championship record.

- San Beda (6) - 2010–11, 2011–2012, 2012–2013, 2014–2015, 2015–2016, 2016–2017
- San Sebastian (4) - 1984–1985, 1988–1989, 1989–1990, 1994–1995

=== Juniors' Division ===
==== General Championship ====
San Beda leads the general championship race with 11–0.

- San Beda (11) - 1982, 1988, 1989, 1990, 1991, 1993, 1995, 1996, 1997, 2015
- San Sebastian (6) - 2005, 2006, 2009, 2010, 2011, 2012

== Basketball Statistics ==
=== Men's basketball results ===
The final four was instituted in 1997; prior to that the first and second round winners, plus the team with the best overall standing if it did not win either round, participated in the championship round to determine the champion.

==== Pre-Final Four era ====
San Beda victories	San Sebastian victories

No.	Date	Location	Winner	Score	Note/s
1	1982	Rizal Memorial Coliseum	San Beda	85–76	
2	August 23, 1996	Rizal Memorial Coliseum	San Sebastian	100–91	
3	September 26, 1996	Rizal Memorial Coliseum	San Beda	81–80	

No.	Date	Location	Winner	Score	Note/s
4	October 7, 1996*	Rizal Memorial Coliseum	San Sebastian	85–69	(Note: Finals Game 1.)
5	October 9, 1996*	Rizal Memorial Coliseum	San Sebastian	82–80	(Note: Finals Game 2.)
(*) = finals games; (^) = semifinals; (≠) = seeding playoffs

==== Final Four era ====
Both teams are expected to meet at least 2 times per year.

San Beda victories	San Sebastian victories

No.	Date	Location	Winner	Score	Note/s
1	October 5, 1997*	Rizal Memorial Coliseum	San Sebastian	84–72	(Note: Championship game. San Sebastian won their fifth consecutive title and the school's ninth NCAA crown.)
2	2000	Rizal Memorial Coliseum	San Beda	86–76	
3	2000	Rizal Memorial Coliseum	San Sebastian	85–83	
4	July 28, 2001	Rizal Memorial Coliseum	San Sebastian	81–77	
5	September 18, 2001	Rizal Memorial Coliseum	San Sebastian	84–69	
6	July 19, 2002	Rizal Memorial Coliseum	San Sebastian	90–72	
7	August 26, 2002	Rizal Memorial Coliseum	San Sebastian	98–85	
8	July 21, 2003	Rizal Memorial Coliseum	San Beda	80–69	
9	August 13, 2003	Makati Coliseum	San Sebastian	83–75	
10	June 26, 2004	Araneta Coliseum	San Beda	76–68	
11	August 30, 2004	Rizal Memorial Coliseum	San Beda	94–86	
12	July 13, 2005	Cuneta Astrodome	San Sebastian	77–74	
13	August 5, 2005	Cuneta Astrodome	San Beda	69–63	
14	2006	Rizal Memorial Coliseum	San Beda	71–52	
15	2006	Rizal Memorial Coliseum	San Beda	77–60	
16	July 20, 2007	The Arena in San Juan	San Beda	73–64	
17	August 3, 2007	The Arena in San Juan	San Beda	96–76	
18	July 14, 2008	Cuneta Astrodome	San Beda	96–76^{OT}	(Note: San Beda had a 2-0 record prior to the game.)
19	September 3, 2008	Cuneta Astrodome	San Beda	62–58	(Note: San Beda ended San Sebastian's 8-game winning streak.)
20	July 1, 2009	Filoil Flying V Arena	San Sebastian	83–77	(Note: Both teams had a 1-0 record prior to the game. San Sebastian gave San Beda its first loss of the season.)
21	October 7, 2009	Filoil Flying V Arena	San Beda	71–67	
22	October 14, 2009≠	Filoil Flying V Arena	#1 San Beda	71–67	(Note: Battle for 1st seed.)
23	October 23, 2009*	Araneta Coliseum	San Sebastian	72–68^{2OT}	(Note: Finals Game 1.)
24	October 26, 2009*	Araneta Coliseum	San Sebastian	76–61	(Note: Finals Game 2. San Sebastian ends season's host, San Beda's 3-peat.)
25	August 18, 2010	Filoil Flying V Arena	San Beda	88–76	(Note: Both teams had a 7-0 record prior to the game.)
26	September 29, 2010	Filoil Flying V Arena	San Beda	90–82	(Note: San Beda had a 15-0 record prior to the game. San Beda swept the elimination round by beating San Sebastian.)
27	October 13, 2010*	Araneta Coliseum	San Beda	93–73	(Note: Finals Game 1.)
28	October 15, 2010*	Araneta Coliseum	San Beda	85–70	(Note: Finals Game 2. San Beda reclaimed the NCAA crown by beating the season's host, San Sebastian.)
29	August 19, 2011	Filoil Flying V Arena	San Sebastian	70–68	(Note: A repeat of season 85, both teams had a 8-0 prior to the game. San Sebastian gave San Beda its first loss of the season, ending San Beda's 26-game winning streak.)
30	October 12, 2011	Filoil Flying V Arena	San Beda	91–70	
31	October 14, 2011≠	Filoil Flying V Arena	#1 San Beda	88–85	(Note: Battle for 1st seed.)

No.	Date	Location	Winner	Score	Note/s
32	October 24, 2011*	Smart Araneta Coliseum	San Beda	75–63	(Note: Finals Game 1.)
33	October 26, 2011*	Smart Araneta Coliseum	San Beda	57–55	(Note: Finals Game 2. San Beda won its 16th seniors crown.)
34	August 13, 2012	Filoil Flying V Arena	San Sebastian	80–71	(Note: Both teams had a 6-1 record prior to the game.)
35	October 11, 2012	Filoil Flying V Arena	San Sebastian	69–55	
36	August 12, 2013	Filoil Flying V Arena	San Beda	83–64	
37	September 30, 2013	Filoil Flying V Arena	San Beda	72–68	
38	August 1, 2014	Filoil Flying V Arena	San Beda	75–56	
39	August 25, 2014	Filoil Flying V Arena	San Beda	86–79	
40	August 13, 2015	Filoil Flying V Arena	San Beda	92–81	
41	September 22, 2015	Filoil Flying V Arena	San Sebastian	98–92	
42	August 5, 2016	Filoil Flying V Arena	San Beda	87–77	(Note: San Beda had a 7-0 record prior to the game.)
43	August 23, 2016	Filoil Flying V Arena	San Sebastian	72–71	(Note: San Beda had a 10-1 record prior to the game.)
44	July 8, 2017	Mall of Asia Arena	San Beda	76–67	(Note: Opening game.)
45	September 15, 2017	Filoil Flying V Arena	San Beda	76–65	
46	November 7, 2017^	Mall of Asia Arena	San Beda	76–71	(Note: Semifinals. San Beda went on to win the championship vs. Lyceum.)
47	August 16, 2018	Filoil Flying V Arena	San Beda	65–54	(Note: San Beda had a 5-0 record prior to the game. San Sebastian's loss was also painful as 2 of their wins against CSB and JRU where also forfeited.)
48	September 27, 2018	Filoil Flying V Arena	San Beda	82–75	
49	July 26, 2019	Filoil Flying V Arena	San Beda	73–59	(Note: San Beda had a 3-0 record prior to the game.)
50	September 24, 2019	Filoil Flying V Arena	San Beda	91–76	(Note: San Beda had a 12-0 record prior to the game.)
51	April 8, 2022	St. Benilde Gym	San Beda	61–60	(Note: First San Beda-San Sebastian NCAA game since the COVID-19 pandemic. San Beda had a 3-0 record prior to the game. JB Bahio hit a game-winning shot.)
52	September 21, 2022	Filoil EcoOil Centre	San Beda	78–71	(Note: San Beda led by as much as 23 points in the first half.)
53	November 6, 2022	Filoil EcoOil Centre	San Beda	82–79^{OT}	
54	October 20, 2023	Filoil EcoOil Centre	San Beda	76–53	
55	October 29, 2023	Filoil EcoOil Centre	San Sebastian	75–67	
56	September 14, 2024	Filoil EcoOil Centre	San Beda	85–75	(Note: San Sebastian had a 2–0 record prior to the game. San Beda gave San Sebastian its first loss of the season.)
57	November 16, 2024	Cuneta Astrodome	San Sebastian	79–70	
58	October 26, 2025	Playtime Filoil Centre	San Beda	62–50	
59	October 2, 2026	Playtime Filoil Centre	San Beda	85–55	(Note: San Sebastian had a 0–4 record prior to the game.)
Series: San Beda leads 41–18
(*) = finals games; (^) = semifinals; (≠) = seeding playoffs

=== Juniors' Basketball Results ===
==== Pre-Final Four era ====
San Beda victories	San Sebastian victories

No.	Date	Location	Winner	Score	Note/s
1	1988	Rizal Memorial Coliseum	San Beda	1–0	
2	1988	Rizal Memorial Coliseum	San Beda	1–0	(Note: San Beda swept the first and second round pennants.)

No.	Date	Location	Winner	Score	Note/s
3	1990	Rizal Memorial Coliseum	San Beda	1–0	(Note: San Beda's only loss in the second round came from Letran.)
(*) = finals games; (^) = semifinals; (≠) = seeding playoffs

==== Final Four era ====
Both teams are expected to meet at least 2 times per year.

San Beda victories	San Sebastian victories

No.	Date	Location	Winner	Score	Note/s
1	1997^	Rizal Memorial Coliseum	San Beda	91–72	(Note: Semifinals.)
2	2001^	Rizal Memorial Coliseum	San Beda	1–0	(Note: Semifinals. San Beda had a twice-to-beat advantage coming into the game, and lost to Letran in the finals.)
3	2002	Rizal Memorial Coliseum	San Beda	1–0	
4	2002	Rizal Memorial Coliseum	San Beda	1–0	(Note: San Beda swept the elimination round, and won against Letran in the finals.)
5	2003	Rizal Memorial Coliseum	San Beda	1–0	
6	2003	Rizal Memorial Coliseum	San Beda	1–0	(Note: San Beda swept the elimination round. San Beda won the finals against Mapúa.)
7	September 19, 2005*	Araneta Coliseum	San Sebastian	83–76	(Note: Finals Game 1.)
8	September 21, 2005*	Araneta Coliseum	San Sebastian	81–69	(Note: Finals Game 2. San Sebastian won its 2nd juniors basketball championship and ended San Beda's three-peat.)
9	September 13, 2006^	Araneta Coliseum	San Sebastian	61–52	(Note: Semifinals. San Sebastian won against PCU in the Finals.)
10	July 14, 2008	Cuneta Astrodome	San Sebastian	77–73^{OT}	(Note: San Sebastian had a 3-0 record prior to the game.)
11	September 3, 2008	Cuneta Astrodome	San Sebastian	60–43	(Note: San Sebastian swept the elimination round and won against Letran in the finals.)
12	2009	Filoil Flying V Arena	San Beda	78–53	(Note: San Beda gave San Sebastian its first loss since season 83.)
13	2009	Filoil Flying V Arena	San Beda	101–80	(Note: San Beda won against Letran in the finals.)
14	2010	Filoil Flying V Arena	San Beda	84–80	
15	2010	Filoil Flying V Arena	San Sebastian	76–75^{OT}	
16	October 13, 2010*	Araneta Coliseum	San Beda	89–64	(Note: Finals Game 1.)
17	October 15, 2010*	Araneta Coliseum	San Beda	95–84	(Note: Finals Game 2. San Beda wins its 17th juniors basketball championship.)
18	2011	Filoil Flying V Arena	San Beda	97–68	
19	2011	Filoil Flying V Arena	San Beda	96–68	(Note: San Beda won against LSGH in the finals.)
20	2012	Filoil Flying V Arena	San Beda	77–68^{OT}	(Note: Both teams had a 7-0 record prior to the game.)
21	2012	Filoil Flying V Arena	San Beda	66–61	(Note: San Beda ended San Sebastian's 9-game winning streak.)
22	October 18, 2012*	Mall of Asia Arena	San Beda	69–51	(Note: Finals Game 1.)
23	October 20, 2012*	Smart Araneta Coliseum	San Beda	83–58	(Note: Finals Game 2. San Beda wins its 19th juniors basketball championship.)

No.	Date	Location	Winner	Score	Note/s
24	2013	Filoil Flying V Arena	San Beda	87–75	(Note: Both teams had a 7-0 record prior to the game.)
25	2013	Filoil Flying V Arena	San Beda	77–72	(Note: San Beda had a 14-0 record prior to the game. San Beda won against LSGH in the finals.)
26	2014	Filoil Flying V Arena	San Sebastian	70–65	(Note: San Beda had a 5-game winning streak prior to the game.)
27	2014	Filoil Flying V Arena	San Beda	84–61	(Note: San Beda won against Malayan in the finals.)
28	2015	Filoil Flying V Arena	San Beda	85–60	(Note: San Beda had a 7-0 record prior to the game.)
29	2015	Filoil Flying V Arena	San Beda	88–57	(Note: San Beda had a 14-0 record prior to the game. San Beda won against Arellano in the finals.)
30	2016	Filoil Flying V Arena	San Beda	74–66	(Note: San Beda had a 5-0 record prior to the game.)
31	2016	Filoil Flying V Arena	San Beda	111–55	(Note: San Beda lost to Malayan in the finals.)
32	2017	Filoil Flying V Arena	San Beda	86–75	(Note: Opening game.)
33	2017	Filoil Flying V Arena	San Beda	85–78	(Note: San Beda lost to LSGH in the semifinals.)
34	2018	Filoil Flying V Arena	San Beda	52–51	
35	2018	Filoil Flying V Arena	San Beda	63–50	(Note: San Beda lost to Malayan in the semifinals.)
36	2019	Filoil Flying V Arena	San Beda	89–73	
37	2019	Filoil Flying V Arena	San Beda	88–79	(Note: San Beda won against Lyceum in the finals.)
38	2023	Emilio Aguinaldo College Gym	San Beda	93–81	
39	February 23, 2023≠	Emilio Aguinaldo College Gym	#4 San Beda	93–80	(Note: 4th seed playoff. San Beda lost to LSGH in the semifinals.)
40	February 10, 2024	Filoil EcoOil Centre	San Sebastian	83–79	
41	February 26, 2025	Filoil EcoOil Centre	San Beda	69–64	
42	October 26, 2025	Playtime Filoil Centre	San Beda	75–66	
43	October 2, 2026	Playtime Filoil Centre	San Sebastian	75–69	
Series: San Beda leads 34–9
(*) = finals games; (^) = semifinals; (≠) = seeding playoffs

=== Final Four Rankings ===
For comparison, these are the rankings of these two teams since the Final Four format was introduced.

==== Seniors' division ====
Team ╲ Year	1997	1998	1999	2000	2001	2002	2003	2004	2005	2006	2007	2008	2009	2010	2011	2012	2013	2014	2015	2016	2017	2018	2019	2020	2021 (Note: 2021-22 season was played in early 2022 and the tournament was held in into a round robin tournament instead of the usual double round eliminations.)	2022	2023	2024
San Beda	2	4	5	6	8	7	6	4	7	1	1	1	1	1	1	1	1	1	1	1	2	1	1	C	3	4	3	3
San Sebastian	1	2	1	4	2	1	2	6	4	6	5	5	2	2	2	2	3	8	7	7	4	6	4	C	8	5	8	9

==== Juniors' division ====
Team ╲ Year	1997	1998	1999	2000	2001	2002	2003	2004	2005	2006	2007	2008	2009	2010	2011	2012	2013	2014	2015	2016	2017	2018	2019	2020	2021	2022	2023 (Note: 2023-24 season was played in early 2024 and the tournament was held in into a round robin tournament instead of the usual double round eliminations.)
San Beda		2	1	2	2	1	1	1	2	3	3	5	1	1	1	1	1	2	1	1	1	3	1	C	C	2	5
San Sebastian									1	2	1	1	3	2	6	2	2	6	8	10	5	8	3	C	C	5	3

Legend * Number denotes playoff seeding. Shade denotes final position.
Finished as the champion
Finished as the 1st runner-up
Finished as semifinalist
Lost in 4th-seed playoff
Twice to beat advantage
C Tournament cancelled

== Volleyball Statistics ==
=== Men's volleyball results ===
San Beda victories	San Sebastian victories

No.	Date	Location	Winner	Score	Note/s
1	2010	Emilio Aguinaldo College Gym	San Beda	3–0	(Note: San Beda lost to Letran in the Finals.)
2	November 25, 2011		San Beda	3–0	(Note: San Beda lost in the semifinals.)
3	2012		San Beda	3–0	(Note: San Beda lost to Perpetual in the finals.)
4	November 20, 2012	Filoil Flying V Arena	San Beda	3–0	
5	December 6, 2013		San Beda	3–0	(Note: San Beda lost in the semifinals.)
6	November 18, 2014	Filoil Flying V Arena	San Sebastian	3–0	
7	2015	Filoil Flying V Arena	San Beda	3–0	(Note: San Beda lost to Arellano in the playoffs.)
8	2017	Filoil Flying V Arena	San Beda	3–0	(Note: San Beda lost to Perpetual in the Semifinals.)
9	2018	Filoil Flying V Arena	San Beda	3–1	(Note: San Beda lost to Benilde in the first round playoffs.)

No.	Date	Location	Winner	Score	Note/s
10	2019	Filoil Flying V Arena	San Sebastian	3–2	
11	January 21, 2020	Filoil Flying V Arena	San Sebastian	3–0	
12	March 18, 2023	San Andres Sports Complex	San Beda	3–0	(Note: San Beda lost to Perpetual in the finals.)
13	April 14, 2024	Filoil EcoOil Centre	San Beda	3–1	
14	March 22, 2025	JRU Gym	San Beda	3–2	
15	April 27, 2025	Filoil EcoOil Centre	San Sebastian	3–1	
16	February 8, 2026	San Andres Sports Complex	San Beda	3–0	
Series: San Beda leads 12–4
(*) = finals games; (^) = semifinals; (≠) = seeding playoffs

=== Women's volleyball results ===
San Beda victories	San Sebastian victories

No.	Date	Location	Winner	Score	Note/s
1	2008	Saint Placid's Gym	San Sebastian	3–0	
2	2008	Saint Placid's Gym	San Sebastian	3–0	
3	2009		San Sebastian	3–0	
4	2009		San Sebastian	3–0	
5	2010	Emilio Aguinaldo College Gym	San Sebastian	3–0	(Note: San Sebastian defeated Benilde in the Finals.)
6	2011		San Sebastian	3–0	(Note: San Sebastian defeated Letran in the Finals.)
7	2012		San Beda	3–0	(Note: San Sebastian lost in the Semifinals.)
8	November 20, 2012	Filoil Flying V Arena	San Sebastian	3–0	
9	December 6, 2013		San Sebastian	3–2	(Note: San Sebastian lost in the Semifinals.)
10	November 18, 2014	Filoil Flying V Arena	San Sebastian	3–0	
11	2015	Filoil Flying V Arena	San Sebastian	3–0	(Note: San Sebastian lost to Benilde in the Finals.)
12	2017	Filoil Flying V Arena	San Sebastian	3–0	(Note: San Sebastian lost to Arellano in the Finals.)

No.	Date	Location	Winner	Score	Note/s
13	2018	Filoil Flying V Arena	San Beda	3–1	(Note: San Beda lost to Arellano in the Finals.)
14	2019	Filoil Flying V Arena	San Beda	3–0	(Note: San Beda lost to Arellano in the Semifinals.)
15	January 21, 2020	Filoil Flying V Arena	San Beda	3–0	
16	July 5, 2022	Paco Arena	San Sebastian	3–2	(Note: San Sebastian lost to JRU in the first round stepladder.)
17	March 18, 2023	San Andres Sports Complex	San Sebastian	3–0	
18	April 14, 2024	Filoil EcoOil Centre	San Beda	3–2	
19	March 22, 2025	JRU Gym	San Sebastian	3–2	
20	April 27, 2025	Filoil EcoOil Centre	San Beda	3–1	
21	February 8, 2026	San Andres Sports Complex	San Beda	3–0	
Series: San Sebastian leads 14–7
(*) = finals games; (^) = semifinals; (≠) = seeding playoffs

== See also ==
- San Beda Red Lions
- San Sebastian Stags
- National Collegiate Athletic Association (Philippines)
- Arellano–San Beda rivalry
- JRU–San Sebastian rivalry
- San Beda–Letran rivalry
- San Beda–Perpetual rivalry
- San Sebastian–Letran rivalry
- Arellano-Perpetual rivalry
- Battle of Intramuros
