= Ogie Menor =

Filipino basketball player (born 1986)

Rogemar Menor
Personal information
- Born: December 4, 1986 (age 39) Roxas, Isabela, Philippines
- Listed height: 6 ft 2 in (1.88 m)
- Listed weight: 185 lb (84 kg)

Career information
- High school: San Beda (Manila)
- College: San Beda
- PBA draft: 2009: 1st round, 6th overall pick
- Drafted by: Barako Bull Energy Boosters
- Playing career: 2009–2014, 2018–2020
- Position: Shooting guard / small forward

Career history
- 2009–2010: Barako Bull Energy Boosters
- 2010: Sta. Lucia Realtors
- 2010–2011: Meralco Bolts
- 2011–2014: Shopinas.com Clickers / Air21 Express
- 2014: Blackwater Elite
- 2018–2020: Bulacan Kuyas

Career highlights
- 3× NCAA Philippines champion (2006, 2007, 2008); NCAA Finals Most Valuable Player (2007); PBA All-Rookie Team (2010)

Rogemar "Ogie" A. Menor (born December 4, 1986) is a Filipino former professional basketball player. He last played for the Bulacan Kuyas of the Maharlika Pilipinas Basketball League (MPBL).

== High school ==
Menor spent high school at San Beda College in Mendiola, Manila where he was a vital cog for the Red Cubs in the NCAA Juniors Division. They swept the eliminations of the 79th season of the NCAA paving the way for a duel with the Mapua Robins for the 2003 Juniors basketball championship. The Red Cubs won and Menor was named the Finals MVP. During the 80th season which was his last in the NCAA Juniors, Menor was named the Season MVP and Finals MVP while beating the Letran Squires for the championship.

== College ==
Menor figured in a controversy even before his first college game. He stayed at La Salle for a week before he had a change in heart and opted to return to San Beda College. There, he boldly promised to give the Red Lions the championship. In his first year, though, he struggled to adapt to the college game. Still, he was a threat to other teams. He lost the Rookie of the Year honors to Kelvin dela Peña. San Beda had high hopes of winning the championship after a 28-year drought during his second year. With Menor contributing consistently with averages of 8.6 points, 6 rebounds, and 1.9 assists in 14 games, he finally delivered on his promise as they won the NCAA championship against the PCU Dolphins. In his third year, the Red Lions faced the Letran Knights for the championship and Menor was named the Finals MVP. Menor scored a career high 35 points against the St. Benilde Blazers during his senior year. That was his last year in the Red Lion uniform as he opted to enter his name in the PBA after the season ended.

== Career ==
Menor was drafted 7th overall by the Barako Bull Energy Boosters in the 2009 PBA draft. He was then traded to the now-defunct Sta. Lucia Realtors and later played for the Meralco Bolts. He was waived by the team during the 2011 PBA Commissioner's Cup. Due to injuries to key players Mark Cardona and Chris Ross, Menor was re-signed by the Bolts. He was later traded to the Powerade Tigers during the off-season along with Chris Timberlake. However, he was not signed. He was then signed by the Clickers before the start of the season. In 2014, Menor played for expansion team Blackwater Elite for the 2014–15 season. Menor gained widespread attention on his 'butiki' (lizard in English) haircut that it even reached global attention from several sports websites around the world like ESPN and Bleacher Report.

== PBA career statistics ==
Legend
GP	Games played	MPG	Minutes per game
FG%	Field-goal percentage	3P%	3-point field-goal percentage	FT%	Free-throw percentage
RPG	Rebounds per game	APG	Assists per game	SPG	Steals per game
BPG	Blocks per game	PPG	Points per game	**Bold**	Career high

=== Season-by-season averages ===
Year	Team	GP	MPG	FG%	3P%	FT%	RPG	APG	SPG	BPG	PPG
2009–10	Barako Bull / Barako Energy Coffee	**35**	**19.3**	.353	.290	.553	2.6	**1.2**	.4	.1	**6.9**
2009–10	Sta. Lucia	**35**	**19.3**	.353	.290	.553	2.6	**1.2**	.4	.1	**6.9**
2010–11	Meralco	15	11.7	.386	.200	.333	1.1	.2	.1	.1	2.5
2011–12	Shopinas.com / Air21	22	15.2	.408	.217	.513	**3.0**	1.1	**.5**	.0	5.0
2012–13	Air21	21	14.2	.366	.083	.579	1.6	.7	.4	.0	3.1
2013–14	Air21	13	4.7	**.417**	**.500**	.429	.3	.1	.2	.0	1.1
2014–15	Blackwater	10	15.8	.287	.158	**.591**	1.7	1.1	.3	**.3**	6.2
Career		116	14.7	.359	.237	.538	2.0	.8	.4	.1	4.6
