= San Sebastian–Letran rivalry =

Letran–San Sebastian men's basketball rivalry
- Letran Knights San Sebastian Golden Stags
- Sport: Men's basketball
- Latest meeting: October 26, 2026 (Playtime Filoil Centre, San Juan); Letran, 91–89
- Next meeting: TBA

Statistics
- All-time record: NCAA Final Four (Philippines) appearances: Letran 18; San Sebastian 15; Titles: Letran: NCAA 20; San Sebastian: NCAA 12
- Longest win streak: Letran, 9 (2004–2008)
- Current win streak: Letran, 2 (2026–present)

This rivalry is between Recto's San Sebastian and Muralla's Letran. The rivalry is played at the National Collegiate Athletic Association (Philippines).

Locations of San Sebastian (gold) and Letran (blue).

The Knights became the first 4th seed to upset the 1st seed in the Final Four when they defeated the Stags twice during the 1999 NCAA Final Four. That feat would soon be duplicated the following year when the 4th seed Stags upended top seed JRC Heavy Bombers in the 2000 NCAA Final Four. The Knights went on to win the 1999 NCAA championship.

== Head-to-head record by sport ==
=== Seniors' Division ===
==== General Championship ====
Letran leads the General Championship race with 9–4.

- Letran (9) – 1979–80, 1997–98, 1998–99, 1999–2000, 2000–01, 2001–02, 2002–03, 2003–04, 2009–10
- San Sebastian (4) – 1984–85, 1988–89, 1989–90, 1994–95

=== Juniors' Division ===
==== General Championship ====
Letran leads the general championship race with 7–6.

- Letran (7) – 1983, 1986, 1987, 1998, 1999, 2000, 2001
- San Sebastian (6) – 2005, 2006, 2009, 2010, 2011, 2012

== Basketball Statistics ==
=== Men's basketball results ===
After both Ateneo and La Salle left, San Sebastian (frequently shortened to "Baste") strengthened their basketball program. The recruitment of Paul Alvarez by San Sebastian and Samboy Lim by Letran provided several close games in the 1980s which led to the birth of the rivalry.

In the 1980s, Letranites were notorious for yelling profanities at the San Sebastian players, and on one occasion, led to a rumble at Vito Cruz Avenue when at the last second, a power interruption occurred, causing confusion on what team won the championship. The rumbles between the two schools have become more frequent which solidified the intense rivalry between the two schools. Paul Alvarez would later play for the Pennsylvania Valley Dawgs of the United States Basketball League.

The final four was instituted in 1997; prior to that the first and second round winners, plus the team with the best overall standing if it did not win either round, participated in the championship round to determine the champion.

The rivalry continued in the turn of the millennium when the Stags met the Knights in the finals twice. This led to several memorable games in which the Knights won the 1998 edition with a barrage of three-pointers and free way ows by Letran's Nicholas Pacheco with a few seconds remaining to win their 13th championship. The Knights also became the first 4th seed to upset the 1st seed in the Final Four when they defeated the Stags twice during the 1999 NCAA Final Four. That feat would soon be duplicated the following year when the 4th seed Stags upended top seed JRC Heavy Bombers in the 2000 NCAA Final Four. The Knights went on to win the 1999 NCAA championship. In the 2003 NCAA Finals, the Stags (defending champs) made a rally in the 4th quarter in the 3rd game of their series and kept Letran scoreless for almost 6 minutes that led them to take the lead but Boyet Bautista started the comeback by tying the game at 48-all and then his teammates Jonathan Piñera and Aaron Aban finished the game to win their 15th championship at the expense of the Stags. In 2004, they renewed their rivalry in the second round of eliminations wherein Letran denied Baste's Final 4 hopes and eventually broke their streak of Final Four appearances (since the inception of the final four format in 1998 San Sebastian is always in the Final Four) making it their worst performance in 6 years.

In 2009, Letran ended San Sebastian's 15 winning streak as they gave out the Stags' first loss of the season, and the Knights prevented the Golden Stags from sweeping the 18 game elimination round to qualify outright in the Finals

In 2010, Letran gave San Sebastian a scare as the Stags escaped the Knights with a one-point lead.and The Stags put the Knights in the brink of elimination

In 2011, Letran once again ended the Stags' 15-game winning streak and gave its first loss of the season via overtime.

In 2012, Letran swept the series against San Sebastian at the elimination round. With the Stags had a twice-to-beat advantage over the Knights, Letran once again beat San Sebastian to force another game as Kevin Alas scored 43 points, in the do-or-die game, Letran came back in the fourth quarter to beat the Stags, 73–70, eliminating the Stags from the Finals contention versus San Beda.

In 2017, Both schools met in the playoffs for the first time since 2013 but this time in a hard way with Lyceum sweeping the regular season 18–0 and automatically advances to the finals. 3 teams tied for the number 4 seed in the stepladder semifinals with San Sebastian had the highest quotient among the 3 against Letran and Arellano with the latter 2 needed to figure it out in a knock out match (in which Letran won) in the right to face against San Sebastian. In the proper 4th-seed playoff game, San Sebastian's Michael Calisaan scored a season-high and a career-high double double performance of 36 points and 10 rebounds to eliminate Letran anew with a score of 74–69(with the Golden Stags scoring the last 5 points including a 3-point shot going into regulation that put away the game from the Knights) to advanced to the 1st round of the stepladder semifinals facing off against the JRU Heavy Bombers.

In 2019, With San Beda sweeping the regular season 18–0, gaining an outright finals berth and forcing the post season into a stepladder format. Both teams faced off in the 1st round of the stepladder semifinals with Letran winning the game 85–80(as the Knights survived a late 4th quarter scare from San Sebastian after the Stags cut the deficit into a 1-point game heading into regulation) to advanced to the 2nd round against the Lyceum Pirates (in which Letran also won 92–88) enrouting to their Cinderella run against the San Beda Red Lions, and winning the championship.

==== Pre-Final Four era ====
Letran victories	San Sebastian victories

No.	Date	Location	Winner	Score	Note/s
1	1982	Rizal Memorial Coliseum	San Sebastian	91–83	
2	October 1986	Rizal Memorial Coliseum	San Sebastian	79–75	(Note: The Letran Knights dropped two games in the first round to Mapua, 82–84, and San Sebastian, 75–79, and figured in a three-way tie for second place with Mapua Cardinals and Perpetual Help College.)
3	October 1986*	Rizal Memorial Coliseum	Letran	93–86	(Note: Finals Game 1.)
4	October 1986*	Rizal Memorial Coliseum	San Sebastian	80–70	(Note: Finals Game 2.)
5	October 1986*	Rizal Memorial Coliseum	Letran	88–86	(Note: Finals Game 3.)
6	September 29, 1987	Rizal Memorial Coliseum	Letran	94–91	(Note: Letran denied San Sebastian the outright championship with a 94–91 overtime victory at the Rizal Memorial Coliseum. With Letran up, Jerry Ruiz fouled San Sebastian's Arnold Adlawan with 0.9 seconds left in regulation. Adlawan scored on a free-throw to tie the game at 82. In the overtime period, Letran never trailed as Fil-Am William Johnson and local Roberto Ruiz prevented San Sebastian's Eugene Quilban and foreign-student Napoleon Hatton from scoring. In the final three seconds of overtime, Letran's Fernando Libed, under medication for hepatitis, secured the win with a three-point play off a foul from Hatton.)
7	October 1, 1987*	Rizal Memorial Coliseum	San Sebastian	91–81	(Note: Finals Game 1.)
8	October 6, 1987*	Rizal Memorial Coliseum	Letran	93–90	(Note: Finals Game 2.)

No.	Date	Location	Winner	Score	Note/s
9	October 9, 1987*	Rizal Memorial Coliseum	Letran	63–62	(Note: Finals Game 3.)
10	1987	Rizal Memorial Coliseum	San Sebastian	77–73	(Note: In a rematch of the 1987 first round finale, San Sebastian prevailed over Letran 77–73 preventing a comeback from the Knights which cut the 38–58 SSC lead to a 2-point 71–73 deficit. Paul Alvarez tipped on a miss from a fellow Stag, but Letran's Robert Ruiz split his two free-throws to keep pace with SSC, 72–75. Marlon Bolabola put up a free-throw, then Melchor Teves grabbed the rebound, that led to Crizalde Bade converting two free-throws for SSC off a Jerry Ruiz foul to put San Sebastian up for good 77–73.)
11	1992	Rizal Memorial Coliseum	Letran	94–89	(Note: San Sebastian Stags were on their way to a first round sweep, scoring four straight victories and were leading by 20 points in the second half against Letran, 76–56, in their last assignment in the first round when the Knights rallied back and pulled off a 94–89 comeback victory over the Stags.)
12	September 30, 1992	Rizal Memorial Coliseum	Letran	108–93	
13	October 6, 1992*	Rizal Memorial Coliseum	Letran	98–91	(Note: Finals Game 1.)
14	October 10, 1992*	Rizal Memorial Coliseum	Letran	94–85	(Note: Finals Game 2.)
(*) = finals games; (^) = semifinals; (≠) = seeding playoffs

==== Final Four era ====
Both teams are expected to meet at least 2 times per year.

Letran victories	San Sebastian victories

No.	Date	Location	Winner	Score	Note/s
1	1998*	Rizal Memorial Coliseum	Letran	81–74^{OT}	(Note: Finals Game 2.)
2	1999^	Rizal Memorial Coliseum	Letran	65–63	(Note: Semifinals. Letran, the fourth seed, eliminated the top-seeded San Sebastian Stags who had a twice-to-beat advantage. Letran went on to win the championship vs. JRU.)
3	2000	Rizal Memorial Coliseum	San Sebastian	51–41	
4	2000	Rizal Memorial Coliseum	San Sebastian	67–58	
5	August 6, 2001	Rizal Memorial Coliseum	San Sebastian	75–63	
6	August 27, 2001	Rizal Memorial Coliseum	San Sebastian	83–62	
7	August 5, 2002	Rizal Memorial Coliseum	San Sebastian	72–62	
8	August 19, 2002	Rizal Memorial Coliseum	San Sebastian	74–59	
9	July 14, 2003	Rizal Memorial Coliseum	Letran	73–64	
10	August 29, 2003	Rizal Memorial Coliseum	San Sebastian	63–61	
11	September 17, 2003*	Rizal Memorial Coliseum	Letran	89–73	(Note: Finals Game 1.)
12	September 19, 2003*	Rizal Memorial Coliseum	San Sebastian	85–77	(Note: Finals Game 2.)
13	September 24, 2003*	Rizal Memorial Coliseum	Letran	64–59	(Note: Finals Game 3. Letran ends its 4-year title drought.)
14	July 30, 2004	Rizal Memorial Coliseum	San Sebastian	72–68	
15	September 3, 2004	Rizal Memorial Coliseum	Letran	81–78	(Note: San Sebastian's loss eventually booted them out of the playoffs.)
16	July 4, 2005	Cuneta Astrodome	Letran	78–65	(Note: Letran had a 2–0 record prior to the game.)
17	August 31, 2005	Cuneta Astrodome	Letran	65–46	
18	September 9, 2005^	Cuneta Astrodome	Letran	93–60	(Note: Semifinals. Letran went on to win the championship vs. PCU.)
19	July 3, 2006	Ninoy Aquino Stadium	Letran	81–73	
20	August 16, 2006	Rizal Memorial Coliseum	Letran	62–56	
21	July 6, 2007	The Arena	Letran	71–61	(Note: Letran had a 2–0 record prior to the game.)
22	August 24, 2007	The Arena	Letran	67–63	
23	July 16, 2008	Cuneta Astrodome	Letran	71–67	(Note: Letran had a 3–0 record prior to the game.)
24	September 25, 2008	Cuneta Astrodome	San Sebastian	76–73	(Note: San Sebastian was on a 5-game winning streak prior to the game. San Sebastian ended its 9-game losing skid against Letran since 2004.)
25	August 14, 2009	Filoil Flying V Arena	San Sebastian	77–74	(Note: San Sebastian had an 8–0 record prior to the game.)
26	August 28, 2009	Filoil Flying V Arena	Letran	80–63	(Note: San Sebastian had a 15-0 record prior to the game.)
27	June 26, 2010	Araneta Coliseum	San Sebastian	59–53	(Note: Opening day game.)
28	September 13, 2010	Filoil Flying V Arena	San Sebastian	59–58	(Note: San Sebastian was on a 4-game winning streak prior to the game. San Sebastian lost in the Finals vs. San Beda.)
29	July 20, 2011	Filoil Flying V Arena	San Sebastian	71–62	(Note: Both teams had a 3–0 record prior to the game.)
30	September 30, 2011	Filoil Flying V Arena	Letran	82–81^{OT}	(Note: A repeat of season 85, San Sebastian had a 15–0 record prior to the game. Letran gave San Sebastian its first loss of the season.)
31	October 17, 2011^	Filoil Flying V Arena	Letran	70–62	(Note: Semifinals game 1. Letran forces a rubber match.)
32	October 19, 2011^	Filoil Flying V Arena	San Sebastian	63–56	(Note: Semifinals game 2, San Sebastian lost in the Finals vs. San Beda.)
33	June 23, 2012	Smart Araneta Coliseum	Letran	80–74	(Note: Opening game.)

No.	Date	Location	Winner	Score	Note/s
34	September 15, 2012	Filoil Flying V Arena	Letran	82–67	(Note: San Sebastian and Letran were on a 4-game and 2-game winning streak respectively prior to the game.)
35	October 13, 2012^	Filoil Flying V Arena	Letran	92–74	(Note: Semifinals game 1. Letran forces a rubber match.)
36	October 15, 2012^	Filoil Flying V Arena	Letran	73–70	(Note: Semifinals game 2. Letran lost in the Finals vs. San Beda.)
37	June 22, 2013	Mall of Asia Arena	Letran	74–69	(Note: Opening game.)
38	October 12, 2013	Filoil Flying V Arena	Letran	75–68	(Note: Letran was on a 4-game winning streak prior to the game.)
39	November 7, 2013^	Filoil Flying V Arena	Letran	85–58	(Note: Semifinals. Letran lost in the Finals vs. San Beda.)
40	June 28, 2014	Mall of Asia Arena	San Sebastian	85–83	(Note: Opening game.)
41	September 8, 2014	Filoil Flying V Arena	Letran	75–73	
42	July 21, 2015	Filoil Flying V Arena	Letran	82–76	(Note: Letran had a 3–0 record prior to the game.)
43	August 25, 2015	Filoil Flying V Arena	San Sebastian	89–87	(Note: San Sebastian pulled an upset over Letran, who had an 8–1 record prior to the game.)
44	July 19, 2016	Filoil Flying V Arena	Letran	90–77	
45	September 2, 2016	Filoil Flying V Arena	Letran	73–61	(Note: San Sebastian was on a 4-game winning streak prior to the game.)
46	August 15, 2017	Filoil Flying V Arena	Letran	79–75^{OT}	
47	September 26, 2017	Filoil Flying V Arena	San Sebastian	95–64	
48	October 24, 2017≠	Filoil Flying V Arena	#4 San Sebastian	74–69	(Note: 4th seed-playoff. San Sebastian enters the semifinals for the 1st time since 2013, San Sebastian lost in the semifinals vs. San Beda.)
49	July 20, 2018	Filoil Flying V Arena	Letran	83–76	
50	October 9, 2018	Filoil Flying V Arena	Letran	79–61	
51	August 20, 2019	Filoil Flying V Arena	San Sebastian	102–101^{OT}	
52	September 20, 2019	Filoil Flying V Arena	Letran	99–82	(Note: Letran ends San Sebastian's 5-game winning streak.)
53	November 5, 2019^	Filoil Flying V Arena	Letran	85–80	(Note: Stepladder semifinals 1st round. Letran went on to win the championship vs. San Beda.)
54	April 26, 2022	St. Benilde Gym	Letran	73–69	(Note: First Letran-San Sebastian NCAA game since the COVID-19 pandemic. Letran had a 7–0 record prior to the game. Letran eliminated San Sebastian from the play-in tournament contention.)
55	October 5, 2022	Filoil EcoOil Centre	Letran	77–69	
56	October 23, 2022	Filoil EcoOil Centre	Letran	69–50	
57	October 18, 2023	Filoil EcoOil Centre	Letran	86–71	(Note: Letran had a 0–7 record prior to the game.)
58	November 8, 2023	Filoil EcoOil Centre	San Sebastian	94–75	
59	September 8, 2024	Filoil EcoOil Centre	San Sebastian	91–84	(Note: Opening game.)
60	October 22, 2024	Filoil EcoOil Centre	Letran	101–98^{2OT}	
61	October 29, 2025	Playtime Filoil Centre	San Sebastian	82–81	(Note: Before the game, Letran was riding a five-game winning streak, while San Sebastian was coming off five consecutive losses. Jhuniel Dela Rama sank a game-winning jumper. This game also marks the first match-up between San Sebastian's Ian and Letran's Deo Cuajao, who are brothers.)
62	September 18, 2026	Playtime Filoil Centre	Letran	99–62	
63	October 23, 2026	Playtime Filoil Centre	Letran	91–89	
Series: Letran leads 40–23
(*) = finals games; (^) = semifinals; (≠) = seeding playoffs

=== Juniors' Basketball Results ===
==== Pre-Final Four era ====
Letran victories	San Sebastian victories

No.	Date	Location	Winner	Score	Note/s
1	October 1, 1987	Rizal Memorial Coliseum	San Sebastian	91–83	(Note: Finals Game 1.)
2	1988	Rizal Memorial Coliseum	Letran	1–0	(Note: Letran's first round elimination round losses came from San Beda and JRU only.)

No.	Date	Location	Winner	Score	Note/s
3	1990	Rizal Memorial Coliseum	Letran	1–0	(Note: Letran swept the second round elimination.)
(*) = finals games; (^) = semifinals; (≠) = seeding playoffs

==== Final Four era ====
Both teams are expected to meet at least 2 times per year.

Letran victories	San Sebastian victories

No.	Date	Location	Winner	Score	Note/s
1	2005	Rizal Memorial Coliseum	San Sebastian	1–0	
2	2005	Rizal Memorial Coliseum	San Sebastian	1–0	(Note: Letran was winless in the elimination round.)
3	2006	Rizal Memorial Coliseum	San Sebastian	1–0	
4	2006	Rizal Memorial Coliseum	San Sebastian	1–0	(Note: Letran was winless in the elimination round.)
5	July 2, 2007	The Arena in San Juan	Letran	75–74	
6	August 24, 2007	The Arena in San Juan	San Sebastian	70–64	
7	September 19, 2007*	The Arena in San Juan	San Sebastian	90–72	(Note: Finals Game 1.)
8	September 26, 2007*	The Arena in San Juan	San Sebastian	88–83	(Note: Finals Game 2. San Sebastian won its 3rd consecutive and 4th juniors basketball championship.)
9	July 16, 2008	Cuneta Astrodome	San Sebastian	79–70	(Note: San Sebastian had 4–0 record prior to the game.)
10	August 20, 2008	Cuneta Astrodome	San Sebastian	88–80	(Note: San Sebastian had 8–0 record prior to the game.)
11	July 16, 2008	Cuneta Astrodome	San Sebastian	79–70	(Note: San Sebastian had 4–0 record prior to the game.)
12	September 24, 2008*	Araneta Coliseum	San Sebastian	83–81	(Note: Finals Game 1.)
13	September 24, 2008*	Araneta Coliseum	San Sebastian	77–70	(Note: Finals Game 2. San Sebastian won its 4th consecutive and 5th juniors basketball championship.)
14	2009	Filoil Flying V Arena	Letran	89–79	
15	2009	Filoil Flying V Arena	Letran	81–73	
16	October 16, 2009^	Filoil Flying V Arena	Letran	89–84	(Note: Semifinals. Letran lost to San Beda in the finals.)
17	2010	Filoil Flying V Arena	San Sebastian	89–83	(Note: Opening game.)
18	2010	Filoil Flying V Arena	San Sebastian	78–68	(Note: San Sebastian lost to San Beda in the finals.)
19	2011	Filoil Flying V Arena	Letran	84–72	
20	2011	Filoil Flying V Arena	Letran	85–65	(Note: Letran lost to LSGH in the stepladder round 2.)
21	2012	Filoil Flying V Arena	San Sebastian	87–85	(Note: Opening game.)
22	2012	Filoil Flying V Arena	San Sebastian	75–51	(Note: Letran and San Sebastian lost to San Beda in the semifinals and finals, respectively.)
23	2013	Filoil Flying V Arena	San Sebastian	75–61	(Note: Opening game.)

No.	Date	Location	Winner	Score	Note/s
24	2013	Filoil Flying V Arena	San Sebastian	84–75	(Note: San Sebastian lost to LSGH in the stepladder round 2.)
25	2014	Filoil Flying V Arena	San Sebastian	62–51^{OT}	(Note: Opening game.)
26	2014	Filoil Flying V Arena	San Sebastian	88–83	
27	2015	Filoil Flying V Arena	San Sebastian	75–71	
28	2015	Filoil Flying V Arena	Letran	78–73	
29	2016	Filoil Flying V Arena	Letran	80–73	
30	2016	Filoil Flying V Arena	Letran	75–71	
31	2017	Filoil Flying V Arena	Letran	85–74^{OT}	
32	2017	Filoil Flying V Arena	San Sebastian	67–66	(Note: San Sebastian lost to LSGH in the fourth-seed playoff and Letran lost to Malayan in the semifinals.)
33	2018	Filoil Flying V Arena	Letran	62–59	
34	2018	Filoil Flying V Arena	Letran	87–78	
35	2019	Filoil Flying V Arena	Letran	72–64	
36	2019	Filoil Flying V Arena	San Sebastian	86–81	(Note: San Sebastian lost to Lyceum–Cavite in the semifinals.)
37	2023	Emilio Aguinaldo College Gym	Letran	91–86	(Note: Opening game. Letran won against LSGH in the finals.)
38	February 18, 2024	Filoil EcoOil Centre	Letran	78–66	
39	March 10, 2024^	Filoil EcoOil Centre	Letran	91–77	
40	March 23, 2025	Filoil EcoOil Centre	Letran	88–84	
41	October 29, 2025	Playtime Filoil Centre	Letran	78–63	
42	September 18, 2026	Playtime Filoil Centre	Letran	88–58	
43	October 23, 2026	Playtime Filoil Centre	San Sebastian	81–76	
Series: San Sebastian leads 24–19
(*) = finals games; (^) = semifinals; (≠) = seeding playoffs

=== Final Four Rankings ===
For comparison, these are the rankings of these two teams since the Final Four format was introduced.

==== Seniors' division ====
A.Y.	Letran	San Sebastian
1997–1998	3rd	1st
1998–1999	1st	2nd
1999–2000	4th	1st
2000–2001	7th	4th
2001–2002	6th	2nd
2002–2003	6th	1st
2003–2004	1st	2nd
2004–2005	3rd	6th
2005–2006	1st	4th
2006–2007	3rd	7th
2007–2008	2nd	5th
2008–2009	3rd	5th
2009–2010	4th	1st
2010–2011	5th	2nd
2011–2022	3rd	1st
2012–2013	3rd	2nd
2013–2014	2nd	3rd
2014–2015	6th	8th
2015–2016	2nd	8th
2016–2017	6th	7th
2017–2018	5th	4th
2018–2019	3rd	6th
2019–2020	3rd	4th
2021–2022	1st	8th
2022–2023	2nd	5th
2023–2024	9th	8th
2024–2025	6th	9th

Finished as the champion
Finished as the 1st runner-up
Finished as the 2nd runner-up
Finished as the 3rd runner-up

==== Juniors' division ====
A.Y.	Letran	San Sebastian
1997–1998		
1998–1999	4th	
1999–2000	4th	
2000–2001	1st	
2001–2002	1st	
2002–2003	6th	2nd
2003–2004	2nd	5th
2004–2005	2nd	5th
2005–2006	7th	1st
2006–2007	7th	1st
2007–2008	2nd	1st
2008–2009	2nd	1st
2009–2010	2nd	3rd'
2010–2011	4th	2nd
2011–2022	2nd	6th
2012–2013	4th	2nd
2013–2014	6th	2nd
2014–2015	6th	8th
2015–2016	2nd	8th
2016–2017	6th	7th
2017–2018	5th	4th
2018–2019	3rd	6th
2019–2020	3rd	4th
2021–2022	1st	8th
2022–2023	2nd	5th
2023–2024	9th	8th
2024–2025	6th	9th

Finished as the champion
Finished as the 1st runner-up
Finished as the 2nd runner-up
Finished as the 3rd runner-up

Team ╲ Year	1997	1998	1999	2000	2001	2002	2003	2004	2005	2006	2007	2008	2009	2010	2011	2012	2013	2014	2015	2016	2017	2018	2019	2020	2021	2022	2023 (Note: 2023-24 season was played in early 2024 and the tournament was held in into a round robin tournament instead of the usual double round eliminations.)
San Sebastian									1	2	1	1	3	2	6	2	2	6	8	10	5	8	3	C	C	5	3
Letran		3	4	1	1	6	5	2	7	7	2	2	2	4	2	4	6	3	7	6	3	9	7	C	C	1	2

Legend * Number denotes playoff seeding. Shade denotes final position.
Finished as the champion
Finished as the 1st runner-up
Finished as semifinalist
Lost in 4th-seed playoff
Twice to beat advantage
C Tournament cancelled

== Volleyball Statistics ==
=== Men's volleyball results ===
Letran victories	San Sebastian victories

No.	Date	Location	Winner	Score	Note/s
1	2008	Saint Placid's Gym	Letran	1–0	
2	2008	Saint Placid's Gym	Letran	1–0	
3	2011		Letran	1–0	
4	2012		Letran	1–0	
5	2014		Letran	3–0	
6	2016	Filoil Flying V Arena	San Sebastian	3–2	
7	2017	Filoil Flying V Arena	San Sebastian	3–1	
8	2018	Filoil Flying V Arena	San Sebastian	3–1	

No.	Date	Location	Winner	Score	Note/s
9	2023	Filoil EcoOil Centre	Letran	3–1	
10	2024	Filoil EcoOil Centre	Letran	3–2	
11	April 12, 2025	Filoil EcoOil Centre	Letran	3–0	
12	May 6, 2025	Filoil EcoOil Centre	Letran	3–2	
13	February 15, 2026	San Andres Sports Complex	Letran	3–0	
Series: Letran leads 10–3
(*) = finals games; (^) = semifinals; (≠) = seeding playoffs

=== Women's volleyball results ===
Letran and San Sebastian competed at the NCAA Women's Volleyball Finals in Seasons 82 and 86.

Letran victories	San Sebastian victories

No.	Date	Location	Winner	Score	Note/s
1	2007*		San Sebastian	1–0	
2	2008		San Sebastian	1–0	
3	2008		San Sebastian	1–0	
4	2009		San Sebastian	1–0	
5	2011		San Sebastian	1–0	(Note: San Sebastian gave Letran its only elimination round loss.)
6	2011^		Letran	1–0	
7	January 20, 2011*		San Sebastian	3–1	(Note: Finals Game 1.)
8	January 26, 2011*		San Sebastian	3–1	(Note: Finals Game 2.)
9	2012		Letran	1–0	
10	2012^		San Sebastian	3–1	(Note: Letran lost to Perpetual in the Finals.)
11	2014		San Sebastian	3–0	
12	2015		San Sebastian	1–0	

No.	Date	Location	Winner	Score	Note/s
13	2016	Filoil Flying V Arena	San Sebastian	3–2	
14	2017	Filoil Flying V Arena	San Sebastian	3–0	
15	2018	Filoil Flying V Arena	San Sebastian	3–0	
16	2022	Paco Arena	San Sebastian	3–0	
17	2023	Filoil EcoOil Centre	Letran	3–1	
18	2024	Filoil EcoOil Centre	Letran	3–2	
19	April 12, 2025	Filoil EcoOil Centre	Letran	3–1	
20	May 6, 2025	Filoil EcoOil Centre	Letran	3–0	
21	February 15, 2026	San Andres Sports Complex	Letran	3–0	
22	March 15, 2026^	San Andres Sports Complex	Letran	3–1	(Note: Quarterfinals match. Letran eliminated San Sebastian.)
Series: San Sebastian leads 14–8
(*) = finals games; (^) = semifinals; (≠) = seeding playoffs

== See also ==
- San Sebastian Stags
- National Collegiate Athletic Association (Philippines)
- San Beda–Letran rivalry
- San Beda–San Sebastian rivalry
- Battle of Intramuros
- JRU–San Sebastian rivalry
- Ateneo–La Salle rivalry
- La Salle–UST rivalry
