= Marvin Hayes (basketball) =

Filipino basketball player

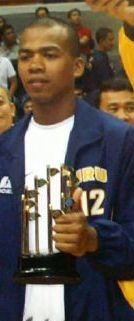
- Hayes in 2007

Personal information
- Born: May 13, 1986 (age 40) Quezon City, Philippines
- Listed height: 6 ft 2 in (1.88 m)
- Listed weight: 190 lb (86 kg)

Career information
- College: JRU
- PBA draft: 2010: 2nd round, 21st overall pick
- Drafted by: Alaska Aces
- Playing career: 2010–present
- Position: Power forward / small forward

Career history
- 2010–2012: Alaska Aces
- 2013: Jumbo Plastic Linoleum Giants
- 2013–2014: GlobalPort Batang Pier
- 2014–2015: Hapee Fresh Fighters
- 2015–2016: GlobalPort Batang Pier
- 2016–2018: Phoenix Fuel Masters
- 2018–2019: Manila Stars
- 2020: Sarangani Marlins
- 2021: Clarin Sto. Niño
- 2021: Sarangani Marlins
- 2023: Imus SV Squad
- 2023–2024: Biñan Tatak Gel
- 2024: Sarangani Marlins
- 2025: Muntinlupa Cagers

Career highlights
- NCAA Season 83 Mythical Five Selection; NCAA Season 83 Most Improved Player; PBA 3x3 champion (2021 First conference)
Medals
Men's 3x3 basketball
Representing Philippines
Southeast Asian Games
Bronze medal – third place	2021 Hanoi	Team

Marvin Hayes (born May 13, 1986) is a Filipino professional basketball player who last played for Muntinlupa Cagers of the Maharlika Pilipinas Basketball League (MPBL). He was selected as the 21st overall pick in the 2010 PBA draft by Alaska.

On September 4, 2013, he was involved in a brawl in a game against San Mig Coffee Mixers. The scuffle ensued after he and San Mig import Marqus Blakely got tangled up. Blakely's teammate Joe Devance shoved him down on the floor, then his teammate Kelly Nabong pushed Blakely. He and Devance were slapped with a technical foul for second motion. He was also ordered to pay P20,000 fine for his “unsportsmanlike conduct, equivalent to a flagrant foul penalty two”.

On May 11, 2015, Hayes was signed up by the GlobalPort Batang Pier as its 14th local player.

== PBA career statistics ==
Legend
GP	Games played	MPG	Minutes per game
FG%	Field-goal percentage	3P%	3-point field-goal percentage	FT%	Free-throw percentage
RPG	Rebounds per game	APG	Assists per game	SPG	Steals per game
BPG	Blocks per game	PPG	Points per game	**Bold**	Career high

Correct as of July 18, 2016

=== Regular season ===
Year	Team	GP	MPG	FG%	3P%	FT%	RPG	APG	SPG	BPG	PPG
2012–13	GlobalPort	6	**16.5**	.444	.000	.636	**3.3**	**1.0**	**.3**	.2	**3.8**
2013–14	GlobalPort	**23**	14.6	.434	.000	.609	2.5	.7	.2	**.3**	3.5
2014–15	GlobalPort	8	6.9	.400	.000	.000	1.4	.0	.0	.1	1.0
2015–16	GlobalPort / Phoenix	7	4.1	**1.000**	.000	**.750**	.3	.1	.0	.0	1.6
Career		44	11.8	.454	.000	.615	2.1	.5	.1	.2	2.8
