= Jim Bruce Viray =

Filipino basketball player

Personal information
- Born: August 4, 1985 (age 41)
- Listed height: 6 ft 3 in (1.91 m)
- Listed weight: 190 lb (86 kg)

Career information
- College: San Sebastian
- PBA draft: 2009: Undrafted
- Playing career: 2009–2011
- Position: Shooting guard / small forward

Career history
- 2009–2011: Barako Bull Energy Boosters

Jim Bruce Viray is a Filipino former professional basketball player.

== Draft ==
He was signed by the Barako Bull Energy Boosters in 2009 as a free agent.
