= Dino Daa =

Filipino basketball player

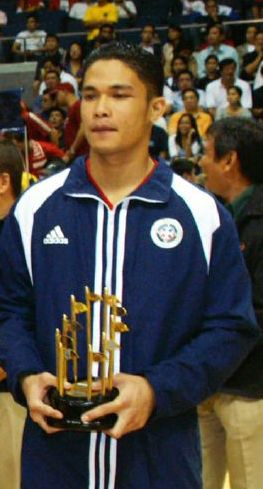
- Daa in 2007

Personal information
- Born: February 20, 1984 (age 42) Tacloban City, Philippines
- Listed height: 6 ft 3 in (1.91 m)
- Listed weight: 185 lb (84 kg)

Career information
- College: Letran
- PBA draft: 2009: Undrafted
- Playing career: 2009–2010, 2018–2019
- Position: Shooting guard

Career history
- 2009–2010: Philippine Patriots
- 2018–2019: Basilan Steel

Fiel Dino M. Daa (born February 20, 1984) is a Filipino former professional basketball player.

The younger brother of Sta. Lucia Realtors' Dennis Daa, he played collegiately for the Letran Knights from 2006 to 2008, and is an undrafted player in the 2009 PBA Draft. He previously played for Hapee Complete Protectors in the Philippine Basketball League. He also used to play for the Philippine Patriots.

In 2014, with Team Raco/Hofer, Daa won the 13th Araw ng Sibugay Governor's Open tournament.
