= Kelvin dela Peña =

Filipino-Canadian basketball player (born 1984)

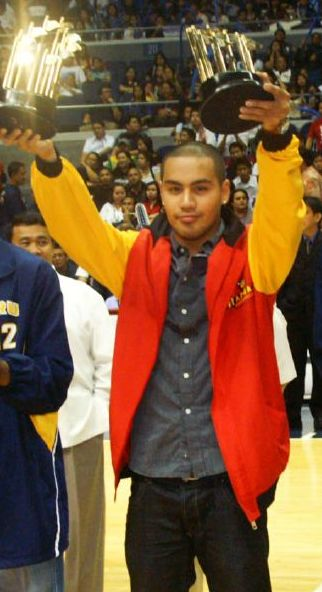
- Dela Peña in 2007

Personal information
- Born: January 19, 1984 (age 42)
- Listed height: 6 ft 1 in (1.85 m)
- Listed weight: 175 lb (79 kg)

Career information
- High school: Bishop McNally (Calgary, Alberta)
- College: Mapúa
- PBA draft: 2008: 2nd round, 15th overall pick
- Drafted by: Alaska Aces
- Playing career: 2008–2015
- Position: Point guard / shooting guard
- Number: 12

Career history
- 2008–2010: Alaska Aces
- 2011–2012: San Miguel Beermen
- 2013–2015: Calgary Crush (ABA)

Career highlights
- NCAA Rookie of the Year (2005); NCAA Most Valuable Player (2007); NCAA Mythical First Team (2007)

Kelvin Charles Chicote dela Peña (born January 19, 1984) is a Filipino-Canadian professional basketball athlete who played shooting guard for the Alaska Aces of the PBA, the San Miguel Beermen of the ASEAN Basketball League and Calgary Crush of the ABA.

== Early life ==
Dela Peña is the youngest son of Susan Chicote-dela Peña and of former Mapuan / San Miguel PBA athlete Ricardo dela Peña. He is brother to Richard dela Peña, who also has an accomplished background in basketball.

Dela Peña was raised in Calgary, Alberta, Canada, where he began his basketball career and suited up for Mount Royal University Cougars. He was named in the All-Canadian team at age 17 and decided to pursue a career as a professional basketball athlete in the Philippines at age 20.

== National Collegiate Athletic Association ==
As a college athlete in the Philippines, dela Peña played four seasons with the NCAA's Mapúa Institute of Technology team, and Philippine Basketball League as well as was a member of the RP team. In his four seasons as a Mapua Cardinal, he was awarded NCAA Season 81 Rookie of the Year, NCAA Season 83 Most Valuable Player, NCAA Season 83 Mythical Five and took the Cardinals to their final four stints all four of his college years earning him the titles of "King Cardinal" and "The Comeback Kid". Towards the final weeks before finishing his senior season of NCAA 84, dela Peña began to suffer from back spasms and played through the pain to assure that the Cardinals qualified in the final four.

== Professional career ==
Dela Peña was drafted 15th overall in the second round in the PBA draft and suited up for the Alaska Aces of the Philippine Basketball Association from 2008 to 2010. Shortly after being drafted, he suffered from three herniated discs in his lower back and a pinched sciatic nerve and was given limited time on the court. After his two years with the Aces, he took a year off to recover. In September 2011, dela Peña became a member of the San Miguel Beermen of the ASEAN Basketball League where teams from the Philippines, Vietnam, Thailand, Singapore, Malaysia, China and South Sumatra compete for a title. In 2013 he returned to his home town of Calgary Canada and suited up for the Calgary Crush, the only Western Canadian team in the American Basketball Association. Dela Peña was an assistant coach for the girls' basketball team at St. Mary's University, Calgary for one season, and has been the head coach for the boys' junior team at Bishop McNally High School since 2014.

His passion to help others with physical disabilities led dela Peña to pursue a career as a strength and conditioning specialist. In 2015 he co-founded Rise Up Hoops, a basketball academy that develops local Calgary talent through on court training and strength and conditioning programming for peak athletic performance.

Preceded by Gabby Espinas	NCAA Seniors' Basketball Rookie of the Year; 2005	Succeeded by Sam Ekwe
Preceded by Sam Ekwe	NCAA Seniors' Basketball Most Valuable Player; 2007	Succeeded by Sam Ekwe
