= NCAA Season 83 =

Philippine collegiate sports season

- Host school: José Rizal University
- Tagline: "Soaring High and Free at 83"

General
- Seniors: CSB Blazers
- Juniors: La Salle Green Hills Greenies

Seniors' champions
Sport		Men	Women
Basketball		San Beda	N/A
Volleyball		Letran	San Sebastian
Chess		Benilde	

Juniors' champions
Sport		Boys	Girls
Basketball		San Sebastian	N/A
Volleyball		San Sebastian	
Chess		Letran	
- (NT) = No tournament; (DS) = Demonstration Sport; (Ex) = Exhibition;

NCAA Season 83 is the 2007–08 Season of the National Collegiate Athletic Association (NCAA) in the Philippines.

José Rizal University is the host of the 2007–2008 season, with this year's theme " Soaring High and Free at 83". NCAA Season 82's commissioner Jun Bernardino was supposed to be the commissioner, if not for his death.

Former Shell Turbo Chargers head coach and Basketball Coaches Association of the Philippines president Chito Narvasa will be this season's commissioner, succeeding Bernardino.

Rizo, the mascot of the 83rd season of the NCAA.

== PCU eligibity scandal ==
After allegations of identity switching circulated via text messaging, Philippine Christian University (PCU) was investigated by the Management Committee (MANCOM) for alleged eligibility infractions on several of its varsity teams. The MANCOM has completed its own investigation and are waiting for PCU's internal investigation and has hinted of suspending the Dolphins for Season 83 after PCU's representatives did not show up in the MANCOM meeting.

After the deliberation by the MANCOM, the NCAA, via a statement issued by NCAA and José Rizal University (JRU) President Vicente Fabella, suspended the Dolphins from all events after four players of the Baby Dolphins basketball team were found to have used falsified documents. The Baby Dolphins were ordered to return their second-place trophy from last season's tournament and all individual awards. The senior Dolphins' 2005-06 general championship trophy was retained, however.

== Basketball ==
=== Seniors' tournament ===
==== Elimination round ====
Pos	Team	W	L	PCT	GB	Qualification
1	San Beda Red Lions	11	1	.917	—	Twice-to-beat in the semifinals
2	Letran Knights	9	3	.750	2	Twice-to-beat in the semifinals
3	JRU Heavy Bombers (H)	7	5	.583	4	Twice-to-win in the semifinals
4	Mapúa Cardinals	6	6	.500	5	Twice-to-win in the semifinals
5	Perpetual Altas	4	8	.333 (Note: Head-to-head record: Perpetual 1–1 San Sebastian (Perpetual +8))	7	
6	San Sebastian Stags	4	8	.333	7	
7	Benilde Blazers	1	11	.083	10	

Source: ABS-CBN Sports
Rules for classification: 1) winning percentage; 2) if tied for top 4, one-game playoff; 3) head-to-head record; 4) head-to-head goal average; 5) overall point differential
(H) Hosts

==== Bracket ====
Semifinals (Top 2 twice-to-beat)
1	San Beda	74
4	Mapúa	64
2	Letran	70
3	JRU	61

Finals (Best-of-three playoff)
1	San Beda	76	76
2	Letran	68	64

=== Juniors' tournament ===
==== Elimination round ====
Pos	Team	W	L	PCT	GB	Qualification
1	San Sebastian Staglets	8	2	.800	—	Twice-to-beat in the semifinals
2	Letran Squires	7	3	.700	1	Twice-to-beat in the semifinals
3	San Beda Red Cubs	6	4	.600	2	Twice-to-win in the semifinals
4	JRU Light Bombers (H)	5	5	.500	3	Twice-to-win in the semifinals
5	La Salle Green Hills Greenies	3	7	.300	5	
6	Perpetual Altalettes	1	9	.100	7	

Source: ABS-CBN Sports
Rules for classification: 1) winning percentage; 2) if tied for top 4, one-game playoff; 3) head-to-head record; 4) head-to-head point differential; 5) overall point differential
(H) Hosts

==== Bracket ====
Semifinals (Top 2 twice-to-beat)
1	San Sebastian	85
4	JRU	74
2	Letran	86	96
3	San Beda	96	92

Finals (Best-of-three playoff)
1	San Sebastian	90	88
2	Letran	72	83

== Volleyball ==
**Qualified for playoffs**	**Eliminated**

=== Men's tournament ===
The men's volleyball tournament began last July 8 at Saint Placid's Gym, San Beda College in Manila with six schools participating.

==== Team standings ====
Team	1st round			2nd round		
Team	W	L	GB	W	L	GB
Letran Knights	4	1	--	5	0	--
St. Benilde Blazers	4	1	--	3	2	2
San Beda Red Lions	3	2	1	4	1	1
San Sebastian Stags	3	2	1	2	3	3
UPHD Altas	3	2	1	1	3	3.5
**JRU Heavy Bombers**	0	5	4	0	3	4
PCU Dolphins	**Suspended**					

Host team in boldface.

==== Finals ====
- Letran Knights def. St. Benilde Blazers

=== Women's tournament ===
The women's volleyball tournament began last July 8 at Saint Placid's Gym, San Beda College in Manila with five schools participating.

==== Team standings ====
Since San Sebastian swept the eliminations, the next two best teams in the cumulative standings advances to the Finals, with San Sebastian having the twice-to-beat advantage, instead of the usual best-of-3 series.

Team	1st round			2nd round			Total		
Team	W	L	GB	W	L	GB	W	L	GB
San Sebastian Lady Stags*	4	0	--	4	0	--	8	0	--
St. Benilde Lady Blazers	3	1	1	3	1	1	6	2	2
Letran Lady Knights	2	2	2	2	2	2	4	4	4
UPHD Lady Altas	1	3	3	1	3	6	2	6	6
San Beda Lionesses	0	4	4	0	4	4	0	8	8
PCU Lady Dolphins	**Suspended**								

Host team in boldface.
* San Sebastian by virtue of their sweep clinches a Finals bye.

==== Semifinal ====
- St. Benilde Lady Blazers def. Letran Lady Knights, 19-25, 18-25, 25-20, 26-24, 15-8.

==== Finals ====
- San Sebastian Lady Stags vs. St. Benilde Lady Blazers, the San Sebastian Lady Stags enjoys a twice-to-beat advantage after sweeping the eliminations
  - Game 1: St. Benilde Lady Blazers defeated San Sebastian Lady Stags- 25-21, 25-17, 18-25, 22-25, 15-13
  - Game 2: San Sebastian Lady Stags defeated St. Benilde Lady Blazers - 25-19, 25-16, 25-13
    - San Sebastian wins the title for the third consecutive year

=== Juniors' tournament ===
The juniors' volleyball tournament began last July 8 at Saint Placid's Gym, San Beda College in Manila with five schools participating.

==== Team standings ====
Team	1st round			2nd round		
Team	W	L	GB	W	L	GB
UPHD Altalettes	4	0	--	3	0	--
San Sebastian Staglets	3	1	1	3	0	--
Letran Squires	1	3	2	0	2	2.5
LSGH Greenies	1	3	2	0	2	2.5
San Beda Red Cubs	0	4	4	0	2	2.5
PCU Baby Dolphins	**Suspended**					

Host team in boldface.

==== Finals ====
- San Sebastian Staglets def. UPHD Altalettes

== Chess ==
=== Seniors' tournament ===
==== Elimination round ====
Team	Points
St. Benilde Blazers	17
Letran Knights	16
San Sebastian Stags	16
Mapua Cardinals	15.5
UPHD Altas	9.5
San Beda Red Lions	8.5
JRU Heavy Bombers	0

=== Juniors' tournament ===
==== Elimination round ====
Team	Points
Letran Squires	20.5
San Sebastian Staglets	19.5
LSGH Greenies	18.5
UPHD Altalettes	8.5
JRU Light Bombers	7.5
San Beda Red Cubs	6.5
Mapua Red Robins	3

== Cheerdance competition ==
The NCAA Cheerdance Competition was held on September 5, 2007 at the Araneta Coliseum. The UPHSD PerpSquad successfully defended their championship, the Mapúa Cheerping Cardinals very much improved to second place as compared to their 2nd runner-up finish from last year, while the Letran Cheering Squad held a notch lower and settled at third place.

Rank	Order	Pep squad	Scores
1st	7th	UPHSD PerpSquad	209.5
2nd	5th	Mapúa Cheerping Cardinals	208.0
3rd	6th	Letran Cheering Squad	201.0
4th	3rd	San Sebastian Golden Stags Pep Squad	175.5
5th	4th	JRU Pep Squad	135.0
6th	1st	St. Benilde Green Peppers	126.0
7th	2nd	San Beda Cheerleaders Association	122.0
DNP		PCU Pep Squad	DNP

The Cheerdance Competition is not counted in the tabulation of the General Championship.

== See also ==
- UAAP Season 70
