= Jamike Jarin =

Filipino basketball coach

Lyceum Pirates
- Position: Head coach
- League: National Collegiate Athletic Association

Personal information
- Born: Philippines

Career information
- College: Ateneo
- Coaching career: 1993–present

Career history

Coaching
- 1998–2010: Ateneo HS
- 2002–2010: Ateneo (assistant)
- 2010–2015: Talk 'N Text Tropang Texters (assistant)
- 2015–2017: San Beda
- 2015–2019: Meralco Bolts (assistant)
- 2017–2019: NU
- 2020–2022: Phoenix Super LPG Fuel Masters (assistant)
- 2021–2022: UE (assistant)
- 2023–2025: Phoenix Super LPG Fuel Masters / Phoenix Fuel Masters
- 2025–2026: Phoenix Fuel Masters (consultant)
- 2026–present: Lyceum

Career highlights
- As head coach: NCAA champion (2016); 8× UAAP Junior's Basketball champions (1999, 2000, 2003, 2004, 2006, 2008, 2009, 2010); As assistant coach: 4× UAAP Senior's Basketball champions (2002, 2008, 2009, 2010); 4× PBA champion (2010–11 Philippine, 2011 Commissioner's, 2011–12 Philippine, 2012–13 Philippine)

Michael Ray "Jamike" Jarin is a Filipino basketball coach. He serves as a head coach for the Lyceum Pirates of the National Collegiate Athletic Association.

== Career ==
=== Early years ===
When he was 18, he coached a team with one of its players was future La Salle player B.J. Manalo, when Manalo was still a 9 year-old kid in an inter-village Filinvest tournament in 1990, Filinvest I was a neighborhood on Commonwealth Avenue. In 1997, Jarin coached the girls varsity team of Our Lord’s Grace Montessori High.

=== Ateneo ===
He started coaching for the Ateneo Blue Eaglets when Chot Reyes' brother Mike, then coach of Eaglets was leaving for MBA. Jarin accepted to fill-in the post and won multiple UAAP juniors championships. One of his notable players was Chot Reyes' nephew Jai, who shot a dagger in 2003 Finals Game 1 win against Adamson Baby Falcons.

That time in Eaglets, he also concurrently served as an assistant to seniors team Blue Eagles under Norman Black, when Black invited him to join.

=== U-17 teams ===
Jarin also coached the U-17 teams in 2014.

=== San Beda and NU ===
After coaching Eaglets, he later coached the San Beda Red Lions, where he won several championships in both teams. He also served as head coach for NU Bulldogs from 2017 until 2019.

=== Talk 'N Text and Meralco assistant ===
He also served as an assistant coach for PBA teams like Talk 'N Text Tropang Texters and Meralco Bolts.

=== UE assistant ===
He previously served as assistant coach for UE Red Warriors.

=== Phoenix Fuel Masters ===
Jarin served as an assistant coach for the Phoenix Fuel Masters. When Topex Robinson was hired to coach the De La Salle Green Archers, Jarin served as an interim coach, and later promoted as the team's head coach with a three-year contract extension.

== Coaching record ==
=== Collegiate record ===
Season	Team	GP	W	L	PCT	Finish	PG	PW	PL	PCT	Results
2015	SBC	18	13	5	.722	1st	5	3	2	.600	Finals
2016	SBC	18	14	4	.778	1st	4	3	1	.750	Champions
2017	NU	14	5	9	.357	6th	–	–	–	–	Eliminated
2018	NU	14	4	10	.286	7th	–	–	–	–	Eliminated
2019	NU	14	2	12	.143	8th	–	–	–	–	Eliminated
Totals		78	38	40	.487		9	6	3	.667	1 championship

== Personal life ==
Being the youngest of four children, Jarin completed his primary and high school education at San Beda. He then attended Mendiola for two years of college before moving to FEU to pursue a degree in biology. His parents own Fairview General Hospital, which has thirty beds, and they are also doctors. His mother, Dr. Amelia Jarin, is the administrator of the hospital, while his father, Dr. Hermogenes Jarin, is the medical director. Iver, Jarin's 13-year-old son, and Jane, his wife, are her top patients as a nurse. Before basketball coaching, Jamike Jarin worked as a medical representative.

Preceded by Boyet Fernandez	San Beda Red Lions men's basketball head coach 2015–2016	Succeeded by Boyet Fernandez
Preceded by Eric Altamirano	NU Bulldogs men's basketball head coach 2017–2019	Succeeded by Jeff Napa
Preceded by Gilbert Malabanan	Lyceum Pirates men's basketball head coach 2026–present	Succeeded by incumbent
