= NCAA Season 101 basketball tournaments =

Basketball season

NCAA Season 101
- "Building Greatness"
- Host school: Mapúa University
Men's Finals	G1	G2	Wins
San Beda Red Lions	89	81	2
Letran Knights	70	73	0
- Duration: December 10–13, 2025
- Arena: Araneta Coliseum
- Finals MVP: Bryan Sajonia
- Winning coach: Yuri Escueta (2nd title)
- Semifinalists: Perpetual Altas (bronze); Benilde Blazers
- TV network: GTV
Juniors' Finals	G1	G2 (OT)	Wins
Arellano Braves	79	88	0
Letran Squires	85	91	2
- Duration: December 10–13, 2025
- Arena: Araneta Coliseum
- Finals MVP: Justin Cargo
- Winning coach: Andrew Estrella (1st title)
- Semifinalists: Mapúa Red Robins (bronze); EAC–ICA Brigadiers
- TV network: Heart of Asia

The NCAA Season 101 basketball tournaments were the basketball tournaments of the National Collegiate Athletic Association (Philippines) (NCAA) for its 101st season, during the 2025–26 academic year. The tournament is being hosted by Mapúa University. The tournaments saw a new format, with teams divided into two groups, and the playoffs having four rounds.

The men's tournament began on October 1, 2025, while the juniors' tournament began a day later. Both tournaments featured a new format, with two groups, and all teams qualifying to the playoffs, with the playoffs concluding on December 13.

In the men's tournament, the Perpetual Altas and the San Beda Red Lions both topped their respective groups. In the quarterfinals, the Altas defeated the JRU Heavy Bombers, winners of the play-in against the EAC Generals. San Beda also eliminated play-in winners Lyceum Pirates, which had defeated the San Sebastian Stags. The Letran Knights eliminated the Arellano Chiefs, which had the twice-to-beat advantage, while the Benilde Blazers needed two games to eliminate the defending champions Mapua Cardinals. In the semifinals, the Knights then eliminated the Altas, and the Red Lions eliminated Benilde. San Beda then won the NCAA title in the finals against Letran.

In the juniors' tournament, group winners Mapua Red Robins and EAC Brigadiers were defeated in the semifinals by the Arellano Braves and Letran Squires, respectively. The Squires then defeated the Braves in the finals.

== Tournament format ==
On July 24, 2025, season hosts Mapúa University announced a modification to the overall format of both the men's and juniors' tournaments which will also be applied for volleyball. Initially described as mixing elements of the NBA play-in tournament and the U.S. NCAA Division I men's basketball tournament, it was initially revealed that the teams are to be divided into two groups of five. The changes were due to Metro Manila hosting the 2025 FIVB Men's Volleyball World Championship, which caused the NCAA to delay the opening due to venue availability, and to make sure the tournament ends before Christmas.

On the day of the draw, on August 29, 2025, it was revealed that teams will be indeed divided into two groups of five teams, with each team playing the teams on its group twice, then teams on the other group once, for a total of 13 games each. The top three teams per group advance to the quarterfinals outright, with the top 2 teams in each group with the twice-to-beat advantage, and the bottom two teams figure in a play-in game. The quarterfinals pair a team from the opposite group. The semifinals and finals are best of three playoffs. The semifinalists from Season 100 are seeded, with the 1st and 4th placed teams being grouped together, as well as the 2nd and 3rd placed teams.

Playoff match-ups originally had the top 2 seeds per group separated until the finals if they made it to that stage. However, after the revision of schedules with the postponement of games due to Typhoon Uwan (Fung-wong), the NCAA changed the semifinal pairings, where the top 2 seeds in the group, if both win in the quarterfinals, will meet in the semifinals instead of the finals.

Rico Quicho was named as this year's basketball commissioner. The juniors' tournament, which had been played separately since the COVID-19 pandemic, will now be held together with the men's tournament. Earlier reports published list Quicho as a San Beda University alumnus, but Quicho himself denied this, saying he studied at De La Salle University for his undergraduate degree, Ateneo Law School for his bachelors of law, and the University of California, Berkeley for his masters of law. Quicho teaches law at the San Beda College Alabang School of Law.

== Teams ==
Men's teams
Team	College	Coach
Arellano Chiefs	Arellano University (AU)	(Philippines) Chico Manabat
Letran Knights	Colegio de San Juan de Letran (CSJL)	(Philippines) Allen Ricardo
Benilde Blazers	De La Salle–College of Saint Benilde (CSB)	(Philippines) Charles Tiu
EAC Generals	Emilio Aguinaldo College (EAC)	(Philippines) Jerson Cabiltes
JRU Heavy Bombers	José Rizal University (JRU)	(Philippines) Nani Epondulan
Lyceum Pirates	Lyceum of the Philippines University (LPU)	(Philippines) Gilbert Malabanan
Mapúa Cardinals	Mapúa University (MU)	(Philippines) Randy Alcantara
San Beda Red Lions	San Beda University (SBU)	(Philippines) Yuri Escueta
San Sebastian Stags	San Sebastian College – Recoletos (SSC–R)	(Philippines) Rob Labagala
Perpetual Altas	University of Perpetual Help System DALTA (UPHSD)	(Philippines) Olsen Racela

Juniors' teams
Team	High school	Coach
Arellano Braves	Arellano University High School (AU)	(Philippines) Anthony Urbano
Letran Squires	Colegio de San Juan de Letran (CSJL)	(Philippines) Andrew Estrella
EAC Brigadiers	Emilio Aguinaldo College (EAC)	(Philippines) Noy Catalan
JRU Light Bombers	José Rizal University (JRU)	(Philippines) Edsel Vallena
La Salle Green Hills Greenies	La Salle Green Hills (LSGH)	(Philippines) Renren Ritualo
Lyceum Junior Pirates	Lyceum of the Philippines University – Cavite (LPU–C)	(Philippines) Al Vergara
Malayan Red Robins	Malayan High School of Science (MHSS)	(Philippines) JR Dela Cruz
San Beda Red Cubs	San Beda University – Rizal (SBU–R)	(Philippines) Britt Reroma
San Sebastian Staglets	San Sebastian College – Recoletos (SSC–R)	(Philippines) Chelito Caro
Perpetual Junior Altas	University of Perpetual Help System DALTA (UPHSD)	(Philippines) Joph Cleopas

=== Coaching changes ===
Team	Outgoing coach	Manner of departure	Date	Replaced by	Date
JRU Heavy Bombers	(Philippines) Louie Gonzalez	Contracts bought out	January 22, 2025	(Philippines) Nani Epondulan	January 31, 2025
San Sebastian Stags	(Philippines) Arvin Bonleon	Contracts not renewed	March 2, 2025	(Philippines) Rob Labagala	March 14, 2025
San Beda Red Cubs	(Philippines) Miko Roldan	Fired	June 22, 2025	(Philippines) Britt Reroma	June 22, 2025
Letran Squires	(Philippines) Willie Miller	Resigned	May 21, 2025	(Philippines) Andrew Estrella	July 4, 2025

=== Draw ===
The seeding and draw for the men's tournament was the basis for the juniors' tournament, as well. The determination of the seeds was based on the results of the Season 100 men's tournament.

Seeded teams	Unseeded teams
Mapúa (1)	Arellano
Benilde/LSGH (2)	Letran
San Beda (3)	EAC
Lyceum (4)	JRU
—N/a	San Sebastian
—N/a	Perpetual

The draw was held on August 29, 2025

Group A	Group B
Arellano	Benilde/LSGH
Lyceum	Letran
Mapúa	EAC
San Sebastian	JRU
Perpetual	San Beda

Group B was labeled by fans as the "group of death" for the men's tournament, with Group A with hosts Mapúa having been described as the "easier" path.

== Venues ==
Venues in Metro Manila

Opening day is on Araneta Coliseum, with most game days held at Playtime Filoil Centre, four game days at the SM Mall of Asia Arena, and two game days at the Rizal Memorial Coliseum, the NCAA's former longtime home. Opening day of the juniors' tournament is at the Ninoy Aquino Stadium.

Arena	Location	M	J	Capacity
Araneta Coliseum	Quezon City	check	check	14,429
Ninoy Aquino Stadium (NAS)	Manila		check	6,000
Playtime Filoil Centre	San Juan	check	check	6,000
Rizal Memorial Coliseum (RMC)	Manila	check	check	6,100
SM Mall of Asia Arena (MOA)	Pasay	check	check	15,000

== Squads ==
Each team can have up to 15 players on their roster, with an additional up to three players in the injured reserve list.

The ban of foreign student-athletes first applied in Season 96 (2020) is still in effect, requiring all players to be Filipinos.

Men's rosters
Arellano	Letran	Benilde	EAC	JRU	Lyceum	Mapúa	San Beda	San Sebastian	Perpetual
Renzo Abiera	John Alejandro	Jhommel Ancheta	Brianne Angeles	Shawn Argente	Jovan Abregana	Sherfrazkhan Abdulla	Yukien Andrada	Rafael Are	John Abis
Anthony Borromeo	Jovel Baliling	Joshua Cajucom	Jethro Bacud	Lance Benitez	Lance Aurigue	Icee Callangan	JC Bonzalida	Matt Acosta	Josiah Alcantara
Leyton Buenaventura	Aaron Buensalida	Raffy Celiz	Jude Bagay	John Canoza	Genesis Aviles	Yam Concepcion	Recaredo Calimag	Jerover Cabilla	Aries Borja
Anjord Cabotaje	Deo Cuajao	Gab Cometa	EJ Castillo	Franzen Casinillo	John Barba	Cyrus Cuenco	Joe Celzo	Clarence Cruz	JP Boral
Yuan Camay	Jimboy Estrada	Bonn Daja	Joshua Devara	Jayson Castillo	Richmond Casiño	Drex delos Reyes	Ismael Culdora	Niel Castor	Andrew Casinillo
Dominic Dayrit	Lorge Gammad	Anton Eusebio	Ruzzelle Dominguez	Benedict Catapang	Jonathan Daileg	Clint Escamis	Penny Estacio	Ian Cuajao	Kenji Duremdes
Girbaud Demetria	Alex Gazzingan	Irele Galas	Adam Doria	Yuri Duque	Charles Dural	Cyril Gonzales	Zedjay Etulle	Jhuniel dela Rama	Angelo Gelsano
Ernjay Geromino	Jonathan Manalili	Jake Gaspay	Mac Jacob	Paul Enal	Nathaniel Fuentes	Joe Gulapa	Nygel Gonzales	Markus Dimaunahan	Mark Gojo Cruz
Joseph Cyril Hernal	Nathaniel Montecillo	Jio Gonzaga	Gelo Loristo	Gyllien Esguerra	Omar Gordon	Marc Igliane	Rafael Jalbuena	TJ Felebrico	Kevin Guibao
Matthew Langit	Edvil Mundas	Jericho Jalalon	Deo Lucero	Jay Garupil	Jasper Matienzo	Ivan Lazarte	Kyle Jamora	Ralph Gubat	Kylle Magdangal
Charles Libang	Mark Omega	Allen Liwag	Kyle Ochavo	Harry Herrera	Gyle Montaño	Cyrus Nitura	Bismarck Lina	Jaime Gomez de Liaño	Ray Allen Maglupay
Will Miller	Joss Poli	John Morales	Wilmar Oftana	Allan Laurenaria	Neil Moralejo	JC Recto	Agjanti Miller	Axcel Kitane	Jearico Nuñez
T-mc Ongotan	Jun Roque	SJ Moore	Jearolan Omandac	Justin Lozano	Lyon Pallingayan	Sebastian Reyes	Jomel Puno	Jose Lumanag	Shawn Michael Orgo
Basti Valencia	Peter Rosillo	Matthew Oli	Rico Postanes	Ivan Panapanaan	Dave Paulo	Edward Ryan	Jimuel Reyes	Gabriel Nepacena	Jan Pagulayan
Maverick Vinoya	Kevin Santos	Justine Sanchez	Nico Quinal	Jhun Peñaverde	Simon Peñafiel	Earl Sapasap	Bryan Sajonia	Thomas Pillado	Emmanuel Pizzaro
Andrei Acop	Syrex Silorio	Ian Torres	Jacob Shanoda	Sean Salvador	Jethro Reyes		Menard Songcuya	Christian Ricio	Jan Roluna
Kyle Anama	Luiz Tapenio	Shawn Umali	Joshua Tolentino	Vince Sarmiento	John Versoza		Ron Rei Tolentino	Vincent Segovia	Patrick Sleat
Joseph Espiritu Jr.	Elijah Yusi	Tony Ynot	Felix Villarente	Rasa Soleimani	Renz Villegas		MJ Vailoces	Leonardo Velasco	Juan Tulabut

== Men's tournament ==
The men's tournament started on October 1, with the traditional host school vs. champion team opening game featuring the defending champions and host school Mapúa Cardinals going up against last season's host Lyceum Pirates.

=== Group stage ===
The NCAA postponed November 9 and November 11 games due to inclement weather caused by Typhoon Fung-wong (Uwan).

==== Group A ====
===== Team standings =====
Pos	Team	W	L	PCT	GB	Qualification
1	Perpetual Altas	9	4	.692	—	Twice-to-beat in the quarterfinals
2	Arellano Chiefs	7	6	.538 (Note: Head-to-head record: Arellano 1–1 Mapua (Arellano +1))	2	Twice-to-beat in the quarterfinals
3	Mapúa Cardinals (H)	7	6	.538	2	Twice-to-win in the quarterfinals
4	Lyceum Pirates	3	10	.231 (Note: Head-to-head record: Lyceum 1–1 San Sebastian (Lyceum +8))	6	Proceed to play-in game
5	San Sebastian Stags	3	10	.231	6	Proceed to play-in game

Source: Rappler
(H) Hosts

===== Results =====
Team	Game												
Team	1	2	3	4	5	6	7	8	9	10	11	12	13
Arellano (AU)	MU; 87–90	SSC-R; 82–66	UPHSD; 67–72	LPU; 92–65	EAC; 73–84	CSB; 72–67	SBU; 53–76	CSJL; 65–83	JRU; 77–79	SSC-R; 78–71	UPHSD; 70–69	LPU; 74–56	MU; 62–58
Lyceum (LPU)	MU; 89–90**	UPHSD; 61–73	SSC-R; 94–100**	AU; 65–92	CSJL; 93–95*	JRU; 78–76	EAC; 75–84	CSB; 67–70	SBU; 78–66	MU; 73–78	SSC-R; 88–74	AU; 56–74	UPHSD; 57–72
Mapúa (MU)	LPU; 90–89**	AU; 90–87	UPHSD; 65–75	SSC-R; 70–49	SBU; 70–79	CSJL; 82–85*	JRU; 63–66	EAC; 85–78	CSB; 65–75	LPU; 78–73	UPHSD; 77–61	SSC-R; 77–72*	AU; 58–62
San Sebastian (SSC-R)	UPHSD; 54–67	AU; 66–82	LPU; 100–94**	MU; 49–70	JRU; 46–59	EAC; 71–86	CSB; 64–82	SBU; 50–62	CSJL; 82–81	UPHSD; 62–61	AU; 71–78	LPU; 74–88	MU; 72–77*
Perpetual (UPHSD)	SSC-R; 67–54	LPU; 73–61	MU; 75–65	AU; 72–67	CSJL; 56–63	JRU; 71–65	EAC; 69–60	CSB; 75–73	SBU; 88–85***	SSC-R; 61–62	MU; 61–77	AU; 69–70	LPU; 72–57

Source: Rappler
Legend: Blue = win; Red = loss; Matches with lighter background shading were decided after overtime. (*) Number of asterisks denotes number of overtime periods

==== Group B ====
===== Team standings =====
Pos	Team	W	L	PCT	GB	Qualification
1	San Beda Red Lions	9	4	.692 (Note: Head-to-head record: San Beda 2–0 Benilde)	—	Twice-to-beat in the quarterfinals
2	Benilde Blazers	9	4	.692	—	Twice-to-beat in the quarterfinals
3	Letran Knights	8	5	.615	1	Twice-to-win in the quarterfinals
4	JRU Heavy Bombers	6	7	.462	3	Proceed to play-in game
5	EAC Generals	4	9	.308	5	Proceed to play-in game

Source: Rappler

===== Results =====
Team	Game												
Team	1	2	3	4	5	6	7	8	9	10	11	12	13
Letran (CSJL)	JRU; 69–73	SBU; 58–68	CSB; 80–95	EAC; 84–80	UPHSD; 63–56	LPU; 95–93*	MU; 85–82*	AU; 83–65	SSC-R; 81–82	JRU; 85–71	CSB; 74–80	EAC; 82–73	SBU; 87–83
Benilde (CSB)	SBU; 85–96	EAC; 74–63	CSJL; 95–80	JRU; 73–65	AU; 67–72	SSC-R; 82–64	UPHSD; 73–75	LPU; 70–67	MU; 75–65	SBU; 76–80	CSJL; 80–74	JRU; 76–66	EAC; 87–82
EAC	CSB; 63–74	JRU; 68–65	CSJL; 80–84	SBU; 64–81	AU; 84–73	SSC-R; 86–71	UPHSD; 60–69	LPU; 84–75	MU; 78–85	JRU; 66–69	CSJL; 73–82	SBU; 82–96	CSB; 82–87
JRU	CSJL; 73–69	EAC; 65–68	SBU; 67–66	CSB; 65–73	SSC-R; 59–46	UPHSD; 65–71	LPU; 76–78	MU; 66–63	AU; 79–77	CSJL; 71–85	EAC; 69–66	SBU; 56–65	CSB; 66–76
San Beda (SBU)	CSB; 96–85	CSJL; 68–58	JRU; 66–67	EAC; 81–64	MU; 79–70	AU; 76–53	SSC-R; 62–50	UPHSD; 85–88***	LPU; 66–78	CSB; 80–76	JRU; 65–56	EAC; 96–82	CSJL; 83–87

Source: Rappler
Legend: Blue = win; Red = loss; Matches with lighter background shading were decided after overtime. (*) Number of asterisks denotes number of overtime periods

=== Bracket ===
Play-in games (Single-elimination)
B4	JRU	80
B5	EAC	76
A4	Lyceum	70
A5	San Sebastian	63

Quarterfinals (Top 2 twice-to-beat)
A1	Perpetual	81
B4	JRU	74
A2	Arellano	78	69
B3	Letran	87	77
B1	San Beda	91
A4	Lyceum	67
B2	Benilde	58	74
A3	Mapúa	73	72

Semifinals (Best-of-three playoff)
A1	Perpetual	73	70
B3	Letran	77	74
B1	San Beda	91	75	84
B2	Benilde	72	77	81

Finals (Best-of-three playoff)
B3	Letran	70	73
B1	San Beda	89	81
Third place playoff
A1	Perpetual	87
B2	Benilde	75

=== Play-in games ===
The teams that finished fourth and fifth in their respective groups will play each other for quarterfinal berths.

==== (A4) Lyceum vs. (A5) San Sebastian ====
Lyceum's loss against Arellano relegated both the Pirates and the Stags to the play-in.

HOA

November 25, 2025
11:00 a.m.

Lyceum Pirates	70–63	San Sebastian Stags
Scoring by quarter: 20–21, 18–21, 12–5, 20–16
Pts: John Barba 22; Rebs: Daileg, Versoza 7 Asts: Renz Villegas 4		Pts: Jhuniel Dela Rama 17; Rebs: Jhuniel Dela Rama 15; Asts: Oneil Castor 5

Playtime Filoil Centre, San Juan
Referees: Aaron Cañete, Harry Santos, Allan Manzano

==== (B4) JRU vs. (B5) EAC ====
JRU and EAC are locked in the play-in game.

GTV
HOA

November 25, 2025
2:30 p.m.

JRU Heavy Bombers	80–76	EAC Generals
Scoring by quarter: 18–18, 20–24, 22–16, 20–18
Pts: Justin Lozano 15; Rebs: Ivan Panapanaan 6 Asts: Justin Lozano 4		Pts: Nico Quinal 16; Rebs: Wilmar Oftana 8 Asts: Aldeo Lucero 5

Playtime Filoil Centre, San Juan
Referees: Joenard Garcia, Totie Celeste, Ernesto Bayais Jr.

=== Quarterfinals ===
The teams that finished first and second in their respective groups will have the twice-to-beat advantage in the crossover quarterfinals.

==== (A1) Perpetual vs. (B4) JRU ====
Perpetual clinched the first twice-to-beat advantage in Group A with Arellano's loss to JRU. The Altas clinched the twice-to-beat advantage with four games to spare. Arellano's win over Mapua gave the #1 seed in the group to the Altas.

HOA

November 27, 2025
11:00 a.m.

Perpetual Altas	81–74	JRU Heavy Bombers
Scoring by quarter: 22–16, 19–21, 22–14, 18–23
Pts: Mark Gojo Cruz 23; Rebs: Jearico Nuñez 8 Asts: Patrick Sleat 10		Pts: Sean Salvador 18; Rebs: Allan Laurenaria 10; Asts: Garupil, Salvador 4
Perpetual wins series in one game

SM Mall of Asia Arena, Pasay
Referees: Harry Santos, Kenny Regino, Joenard Garcia

==== (B1) San Beda vs. (A4) Lyceum ====
San Beda clinched a quarterfinals berth after defeating JRU. They then clinched the top seed in Group B by defeating EAC.

GTV
HOA

November 27, 2025
2:30 p.m.

San Beda Red Lions	91–67	Lyceum Pirates
Scoring by quarter: 17–10, 34–30, 22–11, 18–16
Pts: Yukien Andrada 20; Rebs: Celzo, Lina 13; Asts: Jimuel Reyes 6		Pts: John Barba 13; Rebs: Aviles, Daileg 5 Asts: Barba, Villegas 4
San Beda wins series in one game

SM Mall of Asia Arena, Pasay
Referees: Totie Celeste, Garchee Ferrer, Fernando Mañalac

==== (A2) Arellano vs. (B3) Letran ====
Letran clinched a quarterfinals berth and the #3 seed with San Beda's win over EAC. Arellano clinched a quarterfinals berth win their win against Lyceum. Needing to win by at least four points against Mapua, the Chiefs seized the twice-to-beat advantage by winning over the Cardinals.

HOA

November 26, 2025
11:00 a.m.

Arellano Chiefs	78–87	Letran Knights
Scoring by quarter: 27–19, 19–29, 21–27, 11–12
Pts: T-Mc Ongotan 18; Rebs: T-Mc Ongotan 9 Asts: Ongotan, Camay 6		Pts: Jimboy Estrada 22; Rebs: Aaron Buenasalida 10; Asts: Jonathan Manalili 9

Playtime Filoil Centre, San Juan
Referees: Totie Celeste, Garchee Ferrer, Fernando Mañalac

HOA

November 28, 2025
2:30 p.m.

Arellano Chiefs	69–77	Letran Knights
Scoring by quarter: 17–20, 22–11, 23–23, 15–15
Pts: T-Mc Ongotan 23; Rebs: T-Mc Ongotan 10; Asts: Ernest Geronimo 6		Pts: Jimboy Estrada 19; Rebs: Buenasalida, Santos 8 Asts: Jonathan Manalili 12
Letran wins series in two games

Playtime Filoil Centre, San Juan
Referees: Reynaldo Yante, Manuel Felix, Allan Manzano

==== (B2) Benilde vs. (A3) Mapúa ====
Benilde clinched a quarterfinals berth with their win against JRU. San Beda's win over EAC towed the Blazers to the #2 seed. Mapua clinched a quarterfinals berth on their overtime win against San Sebastian. The Cardinals settled for the #3 seed with their loss against Arellano. This is a rematch of the Season 100 Finals.

GTV
HOA

November 26, 2025
2:30 p.m.

Benilde Blazers	58–73	Mapúa Cardinals
Scoring by quarter: 13–24, 14–15, 20–17, 11–17
Pts: Torres, Umali 10; Rebs: Allen Liwag 11; Asts: Justine Sanchez 4		Pts: Cyril Gonzales 17; Rebs: Cyrus Nitura 11; Asts: Clint Escamis 4

Playtime Filoil Centre, San Juan
Referees: Harry Santos, Jonel Buce, Ernesto Bayais Jr.

HOA

November 28, 2025
12:00 p.m.

Benilde Blazers	74–72	Mapúa Cardinals
Scoring by quarter: 24–17, 23–14, 13–22, 14–19
Pts: Raffy Celis 18; Rebs: Justine Sanchez 10; Asts: Tony Ynot 5		Pts: JC Recto 18; Rebs: Cyrus Nitura 8 Asts: Cyril Gonzales 3
Benilde wins series in two games

Playtime Filoil Centre, San Juan
Referees: Ricor Buaron, Joenard Garcia, Ernesto Bayais Jr.

=== Semifinals ===
The semifinals are best of three playoffs.

==== (A1) Perpetual vs. (B3) Letran ====
Perpetual clinched its first semifinals berth since NCAA Season 97 (2022). Letran clinched its first semifinals berth since NCAA Season 98 (2022).

HOA

December 2, 2025
11:00 a.m.

Perpetual Altas	73–77	Letran Knights
Scoring by quarter: 22–26, 14–24, 20–14, 17–13
Pts: Patrick Sleat 21; Rebs: Shawn Orgo 11; Asts: Patrick Sleat 4		Pts: Estrada, Manalili 15; Rebs: Kevin Santos 10; Asts: Jonathan Manalili 8

Araneta Coliseum, Quezon City
Referees: Ricor Buaron, Reynaldo Yante, Joenard Garcia

HOA

December 5, 2025
2:30 p.m.

Perpetual Altas	70–74	Letran Knights
Scoring by quarter: 15–18, 27–21, 22–15, 6–20
Pts: Patrick Sleat 17; Rebs: John Abis 11; Asts: Five Players 3		Pts: Jonathan Manalili 16; Rebs: Aaron Buensalida 6 Asts: Jonathan Manalili 14
Letran wins series 2–0

SM Mall of Asia Arena, Pasay
Referees: Abdullah Marzouk Alhejaili, Glenn Cornelio, Kenny Regino

==== (B1) San Beda vs. (B2) Benilde ====
San Beda clinched its 19th consecutive semifinals appearance, starting from NCAA Season 82 (2006). Benilde clinched its fifth consecutive semifinals appearance. This is rematch of one of the previous season's semifinals.

GTV
HOA

December 2, 2025
2:30 p.m.

San Beda Red Lions	91–72	Benilde Blazers
Scoring by quarter: 22–19, 26–18, 17–16, 26–19
Pts: Agjanti Miller 29; Rebs: Agjanti Miller 9 Asts: Gonzales, Reyes 4		Pts: Ian Torres 18; Rebs: Allen Liwag 10; Asts: Tony Ynot 6

Araneta Coliseum, Quezon City
Referees: Abdullah Marzouk Alhejaili, Totie Celeste, Aaron Cañete

HOA

December 5, 2025
12:00 p.m.

San Beda Red Lions	75–77	Benilde Blazers
Scoring by quarter: 24–23, 18–13, 16–24, 17–17
Pts: Nygel Gonzales 17; Rebs: Jomel Puno 9 Asts: Jomel Puno 3		Pts: Tony Ynot 19; Rebs: Allen Liwag 15; Asts: Tony Ynot 5

SM Mall of Asia Arena, Pasay
Referees: Aaron Cañete, Manuel Felix, Totie Celeste

GTV
HOA

December 7, 2025
2:30 p.m.

San Beda Red Lions	84–81	Benilde Blazers
Scoring by quarter: 21–26, 13–19, 25–19, 25–17
Pts: Yukien Andrada 27; Rebs: Three Players 6 Asts: Nygel Gonzales 7		Pts: Tony Ynot 18; Rebs: Allen Liwag 8 Asts: Tony Ynot 4
San Beda wins series 2–1

Araneta Coliseum, Quezon City
Referees: Abdullah Marzouk Alhejaili, Joenard Garcia, Totie Celeste

=== Third place playoff ===
A third place playoff will be played by the semifinals losers.

December 13, 2025
8:00 a.m.

Perpetual Altas	87–75	Benilde Blazers
Scoring by quarter: 20-19, 22-21, 25-21, 20-14
Pts: Patrick Sleat 19; Rebs: JP Boral 8 Asts: Patrick Sleat 7		Pts: Jose Eusebio 16; Rebs: Jose Eusebio 9 Asts: Ian Torres 4

Araneta Coliseum, Quezon City
Referees: Hector Villanueva, Ralph Moreto, Garchee Ferrer

=== Finals ===
The finals is a best of three playoff.

The Letran Knights qualified to their first finals since NCAA Season 98 (2022). The San Beda Red Lions clinched their first finals appearance since NCAA Season 99 (2023). This is the first San Beda–Letran finals since NCAA Season 95 (2019), and the 17th time both teams met in the finals.

GTV

December 10, 2025
2:00 p.m.

San Beda Red Lions	89–70	Letran Knights
Scoring by quarter: 29–19, 17–24, 22–5, 21–22
Pts: Bryan Sajonia 17; Rebs: Agjanti Miller 9 Asts: Nygel Gonzales 5		Pts: Jonathan Manalili 17; Rebs: Kevin Santos 10; Asts: Jonathan Manalili 5

Araneta Coliseum, Quezon City
Referees: Abdullah Marzouk Alhejaili, Ricor Buaron, Hector Villanueva

GTV

December 13, 2025
2:00 p.m.

San Beda Red Lions	81–73	Letran Knights
Scoring by quarter: 14–19, 23–20, 28–14, 18–18
Pts: Andrada, Sajonia 21; Rebs: Jomel Puno 14; Asts: Jomel Puno 6		Pts: Jonathan Manalili 15; Rebs: Mark Omega 8 Asts: Jonathan Manalili 7
San Beda wins series 2–0

Araneta Coliseum, Quezon City
Referees: Abdullah Marzouk Alhejaili, Totie Celeste, Glenn Cornelio

- Finals Most Valuable Player: Bryan Sajonia (San Beda Red Lions)

=== Awards ===
NCAA Season 101 men's basketball champions
San Beda Red Lions
24th title

The awards were given prior to game 2 of the finals, at the Araneta Coliseum.

- Most Valuable Player: Allen Liwag (Benilde Blazers)
- Rookie of the Year: Jonathan Manalili (Letran Knights)
- Mythical Five:
  - Allen Liwag (Benilde Blazers)
  - Kevin Santos (Letran Knights)
  - Jonathan Manalili (Letran Knights)
  - Agjanti Miller (San Beda Red Lions)
  - Jhuniel dela Rama (San Sebastian Stags)
- Defensive Player of the Year: Jhuniel dela Rama (San Sebastian Stags)
- All-Defensive Team:
  - Jhuniel dela Rama (San Sebastian Stags)
  - Kevin Santos (Letran Knights)
  - Cyrus Nitura (Mapúa Cardinals)
  - Ivan Panapanaan (JRU Heavy Bombers)
  - Allen Liwag (Benilde Blazers)
- Most Improved Player: Renzo Abiera (Arellano Chiefs)
- Freshman of the Year: Jonathan Manalili (Letran Knights)
- Sportsmanship Award: Perpetual Altas

==== Players of the Week ====
The Collegiate Press Corps awards a "player of the week" throughout the season:

Week	Player	Team
Week 1–2	Patrick Sleat	Perpetual Altas
Week 3	T-Mc Ongotan	Arellano Chiefs
Week 4	Jonathan Manalili	Letran Knights
Week 5–6	Jhuniel dela Rama	San Sebastian Stags
Week 7	T-Mc Ongotan	Arellano Chiefs
Week 8	T-Mc Ongotan	Arellano Chiefs

=== Statistical leaders ===
These are for the group stage.

==== Season player highs ====
Statistic	Player	Team	Average
Points per game	Agjanti Miller	San Beda Red Lions	19.77
Rebounds per game	Jhuniel dela Rama	San Sebastian Stags	10.77
Assists per game	Jonathan Manalili	Letran Knights	8.92
Steals per game	T-Mc Ongotan	Arellano Chiefs	2.08
Blocks per game	Ivan Panapanaan	JRU Heavy Bombers	1.38
Field goal percentage	Ivan Panapanaan	JRU Heavy Bombers	68.29%
Three-point field goal percentage	Joshua Moralejo	Lyceum Pirates	42.86%
Free throw percentage	Deo Cuajao	Letran Knights	82.86%
Turnovers per game	Jonathan Manalili	Letran Knights	4.08

==== Game player highs ====
Statistic	Player	Team	Total	Opponent
Points	Agjanti Miller	San Beda Red Lions	34	Letran Knights
Rebounds	Jhuniel dela Rama	San Sebastian Stags	23 (Note: Overtime)	Lyceum Pirates
Rebounds	Jomel Puno	San Beda Red Lions	23	San Sebastian Stags
Assists	Jonathan Manalili	Letran Knights	15	Lyceum Pirates
Assists	Jonathan Manalili	Letran Knights	13	EAC Generals
Steals	T-Mc Ongotan	Arellano Chiefs	6	EAC Generals
Blocks	Ivan Panapanaan	JRU Heavy Bombers	5	Arellano Chiefs
Blocks	Charles Libang	Arellano Chiefs	5	San Sebastian Stags
Blocks	Cyrus Nitura	Mapúa Cardinals	5	JRU Heavy Bombers
Turnovers	Jonathan Manalili	Letran Knights	9	EAC Generals

==== Season team highs ====
Statistic	Team	Average
Points per game	Letran Knights	78.92
Rebounds per game	San Beda Red Lions	47.54
Assists per game	Letran Knights	19.31
Steals per game	Mapúa Cardinals	9.92
Blocks per game	Benilde Blazers	4.77
Field goal percentage	Letran Knights	42.68%
Three-point field goal percentage	Lyceum Pirates	27.65%
Free throw percentage	Mapúa Cardinals	62.81%
Turnovers per game	San Beda Red Lions	12.54

==== Game team highs ====
Statistic	Team	Total	Opponent
Points	San Sebastian Stags	100	Lyceum Pirates
Points	San Beda Red Lions	96	Benilde Blazers
Points	San Beda Red Lions	96	EAC Generals
Rebounds	San Sebastian Stags	72	Lyceum Pirates
Rebounds	San Beda Red Lions	60	Arellano Chiefs
Assists	San Sebastian Stags	26	Lyceum Pirates
Assists	Letran Knights	25	EAC Generals
Steals	Arellano Chiefs	19	San Sebastian Stags
Blocks	EAC Generals	23	San Sebastian Stags
Field goal percentage	Lyceum Pirates	58.0%	San Sebastian Stags
Three-point field goal percentage	Mapúa Cardinals	54.0%	Arellano Chiefs
Free throw percentage	EAC Generals	90.0%	JRU Heavy Bombers
Turnovers	San Sebastian Stags	28	Arellano Chiefs

=== Discipline ===
The following were the issued suspensions for this season:

- Agjanti Miller of the San Beda Red Lions for incurring two technical fouls for faking a foul (flopping) in Game 1 of the finals against the Letran Knights. Miller will serve his suspension in Game 2.

== Juniors' tournament ==
The juniors' tournament started on October 2.

=== Group stage ===
The NCAA postponed the November 9 and November 11 games due to inclement weather caused by Typhoon Fung-wong (Uwan).

==== Group A ====
===== Team standings =====
Pos	Team	W	L	PCT	GB	Qualification
1	Mapúa Red Robins (H)	9	4	.692	—	Twice-to-beat in the quarterfinals
2	Arellano Braves	8	5	.615	1	Twice-to-beat in the quarterfinals
3	Perpetual Junior Altas	6	7	.462	3	Twice-to-win in the quarterfinals
4	Lyceum Junior Pirates	4	9	.308 (Note: Head-to-head record: San Sebastian 1–1 Lyceum (Lyceum +3))	5	Advance to play-in game
5	San Sebastian Staglets	4	9	.308	5	Advance to play-in game

(H) Hosts

===== Results =====
Team	Game												
Team	1	2	3	4	5	6	7	8	9	10	11	12	13
Arellano (AU)	MHSS; 80–83	SSC-R; 92–61	UPHSD; 97–95*	LPU; 77–71	EAC; 87–94	LSGH; 103–110	SBU; 79–74	CSJL; 83–80	JRU; 91–74	SSC-R; 81–83	UPHSD; 85–75	LPU; 88–80	MHSS; 83–85
LPU Cavite (LPU)	MHSS; 74–66	UPHSD; 62–70	SSC-R; 74–67	AU; 71–77	CSJL; 72–80	JRU; 70–74	EAC; 57–64	LSGH; 81–114	SBU; 63–74	MHSS; 80–73	SSC-R; 69–79	AU; 80–88	UPHSD; 73–66
Mapua (MHSS)	LPU; 66–74	AU; 83–80	UPHSD; 65–57	SSC-R; 71–72	SBU; 85–57	CSJL; 69–64	JRU; 74–71	EAC; 83–76	LSGH; 91–100	LPU; 73–80	UPHSD; 89–69	SSC-R; 75–69	AU; 85–83
San Sebastian (SSC-R)	UPHSD; 61–78	AU; 61–92	LPU; 67–74	MU; 72–71	JRU; 73–77	EAC; 82–83	LSGH; 84–86	SBU; 66–75	CSJL; 63–78	UPHSD; 67–64	AU; 83–81	LPU; 79–69	MU; 69–75
Perpetual (UPHSD)	SSC-R; 78–61	LPU; 70–62	MHSS; 57–65	AU; 95–97*	CSJL; 70–68	JRU; 91–73	EAC; 78–81	LSGH; 91–79	SBU; 75–66*	SSC-R; 64–67	MHSS; 69–89	AU; 75–85	LPU; 66–73

Updated to match(es) played on November 23, 2025. Source: NCAA on Livestats
Legend: Blue = win; Red = loss; Matches with lighter background shading were decided after overtime. (*) Number of asterisks denotes number of overtime periods

==== Group B ====
===== Team standings =====
Pos	Team	W	L	PCT	GB	Qualification
1	EAC–ICA Brigadiers	10	3	.769	—	Twice-to-beat in the quarterfinals
2	Letran Squires	7	6	.538 (Note: Head-to-head record: Letran 2–0 LSGH)	3	Twice-to-beat in the quarterfinals
3	La Salle Green Hills Greenies	7	6	.538	3	Twice-to-win in the quarterfinals
4	San Beda Red Cubs	6	7	.462	4	Advance to play-in game
5	JRU Light Bombers	4	9	.308	6	Advance to play-in game

===== Results =====
Team	Game												
Team	1	2	3	4	5	6	7	8	9	10	11	12	13
Letran (CSJL)	JRU; 62–52	SBU; 63–61	LSGH; 70–69	EAC; 81–83	UPHSD; 68–70	LPU; 80–72	MHSS; 64–69	AU; 80–83	SSC-R; 78–63	JRU; 74–57	LSGH; 88–70	EAC; 75–78	SBU; 77–81**
EAC	LSGH; 89–91	JRU; 60–51	CSJL; 83–81	SBU; 72–69	AU; 94–87	SSC-R; 83–82	UPHSD; 81–78	LPU; 64–57	MHSS; 76–83	JRU; 47–56	CSJL; 78–75	SBU; 71–69	LSGH; 98–97
JRU	CSJL; 52–62	EAC; 51–60	SBU; 52–64	LSGH; 66–64	SSC-R; 77–73	UPHSD; 73–91	LPU; 74–70	MHSS; 71–74	AU; 74–91	CSJL; 57–74	EAC; 56–47	SBU; 60–63	LSGH; 88–93
LSGH	SBU; 67–59	EAC; 91–89	CSJL; 69–70	JRU; 64–66	AU; 110–103	SSC-R; 86–84	UPHSD; 79–91	LPU; 114–81	MHSS; 100–91	SBU; 59–76	CSJL; 70–88	JRU; 93–88	EAC; 97–98
San Beda (SBU)	LSGH; 59–67	CSJL; 61–63	JRU; 64–52	EAC; 69–72	MHSS; 57–85	AU; 74–79	SSC-R; 75–66	UPHSD; 66–75*	LPU; 74–63	LSGH; 76–59	JRU; 63–60	EAC; 69–71	CSJL; 81–77**

Updated to match(es) played on November 23, 2025. Source: NCAA on Livestats
Legend: Blue = win; Red = loss; Matches with lighter background shading were decided after overtime. (*) Number of asterisks denotes number of overtime periods

=== Bracket ===
Play-in games (Single-elimination)
B4	San Beda	75
B5	JRU	69
A4	Lyceum	80
A5	San Sebastian	85*

Quarterfinals (Top 2 twice-to-beat)
A1	Mapúa	69
B4	San Beda	59
A2	Arellano	86
B3	LSGH	79
B1	EAC	71
A5	San Sebastian	70
B2	Letran	69	70
A3	Perpetual	74*	65

Semifinals (Best-of-three playoff)
A1	Mapúa	90	86	107
A2	Arellano	99	82	109**
B1	EAC	76	75	68
B2	Letran	77	70	77

Finals (Best-of-three playoff)
A2	Arellano	79	88
B2	Letran	85	91*
Third place playoff
A1	Mapúa	84
B1	EAC	74

*Overtime; number of asterisks denotes the number of overtime periods.

=== Play-in games ===
The teams that finished fourth and fifth in their respective groups will play each other for a quarterfinal berth.

==== (A4) Lyceum vs. (A5) San Sebastian ====
November 25, 2025
8:30 a.m.

Lyceum Junior Pirates	80–85 (OT)	San Sebastian Staglets
Scoring by quarter: 18–19, 12–20, 23–26, 21–9, Overtime: 6–11
Pts: Steven Creus 16; Rebs: Steven Creus 10; Asts: Ken Bo 9		Pts: Khaizer Castillo 23; Rebs: Browyn Tepan 9 Asts: Mark Esperanza 9

Playtime Filoil Centre, San Juan
Referees: R. Buaron, F Mañalac, D. Escaros

==== (B4) San Beda vs. (B5) JRU ====
November 25, 2025
5:00 p.m.

San Beda Red Cubs	75–69	JRU Light Bombers
Scoring by quarter: 15–10, 13–19, 19–19, 28–21
Pts: Andrei Ugaddan 26; Rebs: Andrei Ugaddan 7 Asts: 4 players 4		Pts: Datu Usop 27; Rebs: Mallorca, Estocapio 9 Asts: 7 players 1

Playtime Filoil Centre, San Juan
Referees: G. Ferrer, R. Yante, K. Regino

=== Quarterfinals ===
The teams that finished first and second in their respective groups will have the twice-to-beat advantage in the crossover quarterfinals.

==== (A1) Mapúa vs. (B4) San Beda ====
November 28, 2025
9:30 a.m.

Mapúa Red Robins	69–59	San Beda Red Cubs
Scoring by quarter: 14–13, 21–19, 21–14, 13–13
Pts: Jhilian Palis 20; Rebs: Chris Parame 12; Asts: Jhilian Palis 5		Pts: Andrei Ugaddan 19; Rebs: Andrei Ugaddan 8 Asts: Adiam Larosa 3
Mapua wins series in one game

Playtime Filoil Centre, San Juan
Referees: J. Buce, E. Faraon, H. Santos

==== (B1) EAC vs. (A5) San Sebastian ====
November 28, 2025
5:00 p.m.

EAC–ICA Brigadiers	71–70	San Sebastian Staglets
Scoring by quarter: 20–13, 17–26, 16–12, 18–19
Pts: Xyriel Macahipay 16; Rebs: Xyriel Macahipay 11; Asts: Clint Bonus 8		Pts: Browyn Tepan 16; Rebs: Jhon Ramiso 13; Asts: Browyn Tepan 4
EAC-ICA wins series in one game

Playtime Filoil Centre, San Juan
Referees: T. Celeste, C. Sanchez, D. Escaros

==== (A2) Arellano vs. (B3) LSGH ====
November 26, 2025
8:30 a.m.

Arellano Braves	86–79	La Salle Green Hills Greenies
Scoring by quarter: 27–28, 22–15, 14–16, 23–20
Pts: Aaron Manansala 22; Rebs: Sean Franco 13; Asts: Chris Dy 5		Pts: Jaime Hizon 26; Rebs: Jaime Teodoro 10; Asts: Camillo Jugo 5
Arellano wins series in one game

Playtime Filoil Centre, San Juan
Referees: R. Yante, A. Chumacera, K. Regino

==== (B2) Letran vs. (A3) Perpetual ====
November 26, 2025
5:00 p.m.

Letran Squires	69–74 (OT)	Perpetual Junior Altas
Scoring by quarter: 17–18, 22–13, 10–15, 11–14, Overtime: 9–14
Pts: Egea, Macadangdang 12; Rebs: Egea, Pascual 7 Asts: Chua, Pascual 4		Pts: Don Rosales 18; Rebs: Lord Dulanas 9 Asts: Lord Dulanas 2

Playtime Filoil Centre, San Juan
Referees: R. Buaron, A, Manzano, R. Danas

November 30, 2025
1:00 p.m.

Letran Squires	70–65	Perpetual Junior Altas
Scoring by quarter: 22–14, 18–15, 14–20, 16–16
Pts: Alvin Villanueva 14; Rebs: Justin Cargo 10; Asts: Earl Dahino 4		Pts: Arkin Cristobal 15; Rebs: Arkin Cristobal 11; Asts: Don Rosales 4
Letran wins series in two games

Playtime Filoil Centre, San Juan
Referees: R. Buaron, R. Yante, H. Santos

=== Semifinals ===
The semifinals are best of three playoffs.

==== (A1) Mapúa vs. (A2) Arellano ====
December 2, 2025
8:30 a.m.

Mapúa Red Robins	90–99	Arellano Braves
Scoring by quarter: 25–30, 33–25, 17–25, 15–19
Pts: Jhilian Palis 25; Rebs: Chris Parame 14; Asts: Palis, Relojo 5		Pts: Ray Ladica 25; Rebs: Sean Franco 10; Asts: Franco, Dy 5

Araneta Coliseum, Quezon City
Referees: F. Manalac, M. Felix, J. Tangkion

December 4, 2025
3:00 p.m.

Mapúa Red Robins	86–82	Arellano Braves
Scoring by quarter: 19–23, 23–16, 19–9, 25–34
Pts: Palis, Parame 18; Rebs: Froilan Reyes 15; Asts: Jhilian Palis 7		Pts: Aaron Manansala 24; Rebs: Manansala, Mendoza 8 Asts: Chris Dy 5

Playtime Filoil Centre, San Juan
Referees: A. Canete, M. Felix, H. Santos

December 7, 2025
9:30 a.m.

Mapúa Red Robins	107–109 (2OT)	Arellano Braves
Scoring by quarter: 24–22, 16–25, 25–19, 28–27, Overtime: 7–7, 7–9
Pts: Froilan Reyes 20; Rebs: Chris Parame 14; Asts: three players 3		Pts: Sean Franco 26; Rebs: Ray Ladica 16; Asts: Chris Dy 6
Arellano wins series 2–1

Araneta Coliseum, Quezon City
Referees: F. Manalac, R. Moreto, H. Santos

==== (B1) EAC-ICA vs. (B2) Letran ====
December 2, 2025
5:00 p.m.

EAC–ICA Brigadiers	76–77	Letran Squires
Scoring by quarter: 15–18, 21–18, 20–21, 20–20
Pts: Kelly Coronel 19; Rebs: Coronel, Macahipay 8 Asts: Clint Bonus 6		Pts: Nathan Egea 23; Rebs: Dhale Lumague 8 Asts: Alvin Villanueva 5

Araneta Coliseum, Quezon City
Referees: H. Villanueva, K. Regino, N. Canete

December 4, 2025
1:00 p.m.

EAC–ICA Brigadiers	75–70	Letran Squires
Scoring by quarter: 26–11, 15–12, 14–25, 20–22
Pts: Clint Bonus 20; Rebs: Xyriel Macahipay 10; Asts: Clint Bonus 6		Pts: Justin Cargo 12; Rebs: Dhale Lumague 10; Asts: Cabañero, Valdeavilla 3

Playtime Filoil Centre, San Juan
Referees: R. Moreto, T. Celeste, R. Yante

December 7, 2025
12:00 p.m.

EAC–ICA Brigadiers	68–77	Letran Squires
Scoring by quarter: 23–20, 16–21, 17–20, 12–16
Pts: Clint Bonus 22; Rebs: Tristan Allam 10; Asts: Clint Bonus 4		Pts: Nathan Egea 21; Rebs: Nathan Egea 10; Asts: Travis Pascual 6
Letran wins series 2–1

Araneta Coliseum, Quezon City
Referees: R. Yante, A. Canete, M. Felix

=== Third place playoff ===
A third place playoff will be played by the semifinals losers.

December 10, 2025
8:00 a.m.

Mapúa Red Robins	84–74	EAC–ICA Brigadiers
Scoring by quarter: 26–25, 15–21, 22–16, 21–12
Pts: Froilan Reyes 18; Rebs: Chris Parame 9 Asts: Mercado, Palis 6		Pts: Noel Lanceta 22; Rebs: Xyriel Macahipay 9 Asts: Clint Bonus 8

Araneta Coliseum, Quezon City
Referees: G. Ferrer, H. Santos, J. Tangkion

=== Finals ===
The finals is a best of three playoff.

HOA

December 10, 2025
11:00 a.m.

Arellano Braves	79–85	Letran Squires
Scoring by quarter: 19–22, 19–28, 25–10, 16–25
Pts: Ray Ladica 22; Rebs: Sean Franco 17; Asts: Chris Dy 4		Pts: Egea, Valdeavilla 19; Rebs: Dahino, Valdeavilla 7 Asts: Travis Pascual 5

Araneta Coliseum, Quezon City
Referees: Aaron Cañete, Reynaldo Yante, Dennis Escaros

HOA

December 13, 2025
11:00 a.m.

Arellano Braves	88–91 (OT)	Letran Squires
Scoring by quarter: 18–17, 16–19, 16–13, 24–25, Overtime: 14–17
Pts: Ray Ladica 37; Rebs: Sean Franco 10; Asts: Chris Dy 9		Pts: Justin Cargo 17; Rebs: Justin Cargo 14; Asts: Justin Cargo 5
Letran wins series 2–0

Araneta Coliseum, Quezon City
Referees: Joenard Garcia, Ricor Buaron, Reynaldo Yante

=== Awards ===
NCAA Season 101 juniors' basketball champions
Letran Squires
15th title

The awards were given prior to game 2 of the finals, at the Araneta Coliseum.

- Most Valuable Player: Sean Franco (Arellano Braves)
- Rookie of the Year: Josef Calo-oy (La Salle Green Hills Greenies)
- Mythical Five:
  - Sean Franco (Arellano Braves)
  - Josef Calo-oy (La Salle Green Hills Greenies)
  - Patrick Pasinos (La Salle Green Hills Greenies)
  - Kelly Coronel (EAC–ICA Brigadiers)
  - Jhillian Palis (Mapúa Red Robins)
  - Ray Ladica (Arellano Braves)
- Defensive Player of the Year: Sean Franco (Arellano Braves)
- All-Defensive Team:
  - Sean Franco (Arellano Braves)
  - Patrick Pasinos (La Salle Green Hills Greenies)
  - MJ Bernabe (Mapúa Red Robins)
  - John Bagro (Mapúa Red Robins)
  - Kelly Coronel (EAC–ICA Brigadiers)
  - Browyn Tepan (San Sebastian Staglets)
- Most Improved Player: Laurence Pillas (Arellano Braves)

== See also ==
- UAAP Season 88 basketball tournaments
