= NCAA Season 91 basketball tournaments =

Basketball season

NCAA Season 91
- Host school: Mapua Institute of Technology
Men's Finals	G1	G2	G3 (OT)	Wins
San Beda Red Lions	90	68	82	1
Letran Knights	94	61	85	2
- Duration: October 23–29, 2015
- Arena: Mall of Asia Arena
- Finals MVP: Mark Cruz
- Winning coach: Aldin Ayo (1st title)
- Semifinalists: Mapúa Cardinals; JRU Heavy Bombers
- TV networks: ABS-CBN Sports and Action, Balls, Balls HD
Juniors' Finals	G1	G2	G3	Wins
San Beda Red Cubs	76	68	70	2+1
Arellano Braves	68	72	61	1
- Duration: October 23–29, 2015
- Arena: Mall of Asia Arena
- Finals MVP: Evan Nelle
- Winning coach: JB Sison (3rd title)
- Semifinalists: Mapúa Red Robins; La Salle Green Hills Greenies

The basketball tournaments of NCAA Season 91 were the Philippines' National Collegiate Athletic Association (NCAA) tournaments for its 91st season. The Mapua Institute of Technology hosted the season, started with an opening ceremony held on June 27, 2015, at the Mall of Asia Arena followed by a double-header. Games are expected to be followed at the Filoil Flying V Arena in San Juan, with two seniors and juniors games. The men's games are aired live by ABS-CBN Sports and Action and in High Definition on Balls HD 167.

== Men's tournament ==
=== Teams ===
Team	School	Coach
Arellano Chiefs	Arellano University (AU)	(Philippines) Jerry Codiñera
Letran Knights	Colegio de San Juan de Letran (CSJL)	(Philippines) Aldin Ayo
Benilde Blazers	De La Salle–College of Saint Benilde (CSB)	(Philippines) Gabby Velasco
EAC Generals	Emilio Aguinaldo College (EAC)	(Philippines) Andy de Guzman
JRU Heavy Bombers	José Rizal University (JRU)	(Philippines) Vergel Meneses
Lyceum Pirates	Lyceum of the Philippines University (LPU)	(Philippines) Topex Robinson
Mapúa Cardinals	Mapúa Institute of Technology (MIT)	(Philippines) Atoy Co
San Beda Red Lions	San Beda College (SBC)	(Philippines) Jamike Jarin
San Sebastian Stags	San Sebastian College – Recoletos (SSC-R)	(Philippines) Rodney Santos
Perpetual Altas	University of Perpetual Help System DALTA (UPHSD)	(Philippines) Jimwell Gican

==== Changes from last season ====
Full members (from probationary members):

- EAC Generals
- Lyceum Pirates

=== Elimination round ===
==== Team standings ====
Pos	Team	W	L	PCT	GB	Qualification
1	San Beda Red Lions	13	5	.722 (Note: First-seed playoff: San Beda 83–78 Letran)	—	Twice-to-beat in the semifinals
2	Letran Knights	13	5	.722	—	Twice-to-beat in the semifinals
3	Mapúa Cardinals (H)	12	6	.667 (Note: Head-to-head record: JRU 3–1, Mapúa 2–2, Arellano 1–3; fourth-seed playoff: Mapúa 93–75 Arellano, third-seed playoff: Mapúa 83–76 JRU)	1	Twice-to-win in the semifinals
4	JRU Heavy Bombers	12	6	.667	1	Twice-to-win in the semifinals
5	Arellano Chiefs	12	6	.667	1	
6	Perpetual Altas	11	7	.611	2	
7	San Sebastian Stags	6	12	.333	7	
8	Benilde Blazers	5	13	.278	8	
9	Lyceum Pirates	4	14	.222	9	
10	EAC Generals	2	16	.111	11	

Source: ABS-CBN Sports
Rules for classification: 1) winning percentage; 2) if tied for top 4, one-game playoff; 3) head-to-head record; 4) overall point differential
(H) Hosts

==== Match-up results ====
	Round 1									Round 2								
Team ╲ Game	1	2	3	4	5	6	7	8	9	10	11	12	13	14	15	16	17	18
Arellano	JRU school colors	Lyceum school colors	EAC school colors	Mapua school colors	SSC-R school colors	Letran school colors	UPHD school colors	CSB school colors	San Beda school colors	JRU school colors	CSB school colors	UPHD school colors	Lyceum school colors	SSC-R school colors	Mapua school colors	Letran school colors	San Beda school colors	EAC school colors
Letran	CSB school colors	JRU school colors	San Beda school colors	SSC-R school colors	UPHD school colors	Arellano school colors	Lyceum school colors	EAC school colors	Mapua school colors	SSC-R school colors	EAC school colors	Lyceum school colors	CSB school colors	Mapua school colors	JRU school colors	Arellano school colors	San Beda school colors	UPHD school colors
Benilde	Letran school colors	UPHD school colors	EAC school colors	Lyceum school colors	San Beda school colors	JRU school colors	SSC-R school colors	Mapua school colors	Arellano school colors	San Beda school colors	Arellano school colors	EAC school colors	Letran school colors	JRU school colors	UPHD school colors	SSC-R school colors	Lyceum school colors	Mapua school colors
EAC	San Beda school colors	CSB school colors	Arellano school colors	JRU school colors	Mapua school colors	SSC-R school colors	Letran school colors	UPHD school colors	Lyceum school colors	San Beda school colors	Letran school colors	CSB school colors	JRU school colors	SSC-R school colors	UPHD school colors	Lyceum school colors	Arellano school colors	Mapua school colors
JRU	Arellano school colors	Letran school colors	SSC-R school colors	EAC school colors	Lyceum school colors	CSB school colors	San Beda school colors	Mapua school colors	UPHD school colors	Arellano school colors	San Beda school colors	Mapua school colors	EAC school colors	CSB school colors	Letran school colors	UPHD school colors	Lyceum school colors	SSC-R school colors
Lyceum	UPHD school colors	Arellano school colors	CSB school colors	San Beda school colors	JRU school colors	Mapua school colors	Letran school colors	SSC-R school colors	EAC school colors	SSC-R school colors	UPHD school colors	Letran school colors	Arellano school colors	Mapua school colors	San Beda school colors	EAC school colors	JRU school colors	CSB school colors
Mapúa	San Beda school colors	SSC-R school colors	UPHD school colors	Arellano school colors	EAC school colors	Lyceum school colors	CSB school colors	JRU school colors	Letran school colors	UPHD school colors	SSC-R school colors	JRU school colors	Lyceum school colors	Letran school colors	Arellano school colors	San Beda school colors	CSB school colors	EAC school colors
San Beda	Mapua school colors	EAC school colors	Letran school colors	Lyceum school colors	CSB school colors	UPHD school colors	JRU school colors	SSC-R school colors	Arellano school colors	EAC school colors	CSB school colors	JRU school colors	UPHD school colors	Lyceum school colors	SSC-R school colors	Mapua school colors	Arellano school colors	Letran school colors
San Sebastian	Mapua school colors	JRU school colors	UPHD school colors	Letran school colors	Arellano school colors	EAC school colors	CSB school colors	Lyceum school colors	San Beda school colors	Letran school colors	Lyceum school colors	Mapua school colors	Arellano school colors	EAC school colors	San Beda school colors	CSB school colors	UPHD school colors	JRU school colors
Perpetual	Lyceum school colors	CSB school colors	Mapua school colors	SSC-R school colors	Letran school colors	San Beda school colors	Arellano school colors	EAC school colors	JRU school colors	Mapua school colors	Lyceum school colors	Arellano school colors	San Beda school colors	CSB school colors	EAC school colors	JRU school colors	SSC-R school colors	Letran school colors

= Win; = OT win; = Loss; = OT loss

==== Scores ====
Team	AU	CSJL	CSB	EAC	JRU	LPU	MIT	SBC	SSC-R	UPHSD
Arellano Chiefs		68–77	85–73	92–80	61–78	80–78	100–96*	88–84	104–92	66–76
Letran Knights	87–81		82–53	69–83	78–62	83–78	80–77	93–80	82–76	79–71
Benilde Blazers	82–86	69–79		73–66	49–67	69–72	64–76	67–73	88–66	69–77
EAC Generals	90–98	76–86	57–81		47–67	55–69	72–101	80–108	77–71	55–68
JRU Heavy Bombers	114–112**	86–80	73–69	87–64		75–60	90–87	69–88	89–91*	83–86*
Lyceum Pirates	83–97	57–74	56–59	59–45	55–64		95–109	74–97	70–77	61–70
Mapúa Cardinals	81–76	82–77	77–72	88–63	68–67	70–66		89–102	88–86	79–82
San Beda Red Lions	72–91	77–73	89–63	96–84	83–75	87–80	75–65		92–81	83–81
San Sebastian Stags	76–86	89–87	62–69	91–77	69–91	67–71	78–87	98–92		70–84
Perpetual Altas	77–84*	64–93	70–47	89–59	60–62	70–42	65–70	88–86	87–91	

Legend: Blue = left column team win; Red = top row team win.
Matches with lighter background shading were decided after overtime.

=== First seed playoff ===
Letran and San Beda were tied for first and second; a playoff was held to determine which will be the #1 seed.

Winner faces the #4 seed, while the loser faces the #3 seed. Both still have the twice-to-beat advantage in the semifinals.

ABS-CBN S+A

October 13
4:00 p.m.

Letran Knights	78–83	San Beda Red Lions
Scoring by quarter: 12–17, 18–24, 18–18, 30–24

Mall of Asia Arena, Pasay

=== Third to fourth seed playoffs ===
JRU, Mapua and Arellano were tied fourth to fifth. JRU advanced to the third seed playoff due to superior tiebreaker, while Mapua and Arellano played each other in a one-game elimination playoff.

First round
Mapúa	93
Arellano	75

Third seed playoff
JRU	76
Mapúa	81

==== Mapúa vs. Arellano ====
Winner advances to the third seed playoff and is guaranteed of no less than a #4 seed, while the loser is eliminated.

ABS-CBN S+A

October 13
2:00 p.m.

Mapúa Cardinals	93–75	Arellano Chiefs
Scoring by quarter: 16–15, 33–18, 20–18, 24–24
Mapúa advances to the Final Four

Mall of Asia Arena, Pasay

==== JRU vs Mapúa ====
Winner is the third seed, while the loser settles for the #4 seed.

ABS-CBN S+A

October 16
4:00 p.m.

JRU Heavy Bombers	76–81	Mapúa Cardinals
Scoring by quarter: 16–19, 16–19, 22–18, 22–25

Mall of Asia Arena, Pasay

=== Bracket ===
Semifinals (Top 2 twice-to-beat)
1	San Beda	78
4	JRU	68
2	Letran	91
3	Mapúa	90

Finals (Best-of-three playoff)
1	San Beda	90	68	82
2	Letran	94	61	85*

*Overtime

=== Semifinals ===
San Beda and Letran have the twice-to-beat advantage; they only have to win once, while their opponents twice, to advance to the Finals.

==== (1) San Beda vs. (4) JRU ====
ABS-CBN S+A

October 20
4:00 p.m.

San Beda Red Lions	78–68	JRU Heavy Bombers
Scoring by quarter: 17–19, 13–13, 26–21, 22–15
San Beda wins series in one game

Mall of Asia Arena, Pasay

==== (2) Letran vs. (3) Mapua ====
ABS-CBN S+A

October 20
2:00 p.m.

Letran Knights	91–90	Mapúa Cardinals
Scoring by quarter: 21–17, 24–25, 22–28, 24–20
Letran wins series in one game

Mall of Asia Arena, Pasay

=== Finals ===
This is a best-of-three playoff.

ABS-CBN S+A

October 23
4:00 p.m.

San Beda Red Lions	90–94	Letran Knights
Scoring by quarter: 21–22, 20–17, 21–22, 28–33

Mall of Asia Arena, Pasay
Attendance: 12,825

ABS-CBN S+A

October 27
4:00 p.m.

San Beda Red Lions	68–61	Letran Knights
Scoring by quarter: 22–15, 11–15, 19–19, 16–12

Mall of Asia Arena, Pasay
Attendance: 17,588

ABS-CBN S+A

October 29
4:00 p.m.

San Beda Red Lions	82–85 (OT)	Letran Knights
Scoring by quarter: 12–20, 27–20, 13–14, 23–21, Overtime: 7–10
Letran wins series 2–1

Mall of Asia Arena, Pasay
Attendance: 20,158

- Finals Most Valuable Player: Mark Cruz (Letran Knights)

=== All-Star Game ===
The 10 member schools were divided into East and West. The East squad is represented by players from San Beda College, University of Perpetual Help, Arellano University, Jose Rizal University and San Sebastian College-Recoletos, while the West team draws from Lyceum of the Philippines University, Emilio Aguinaldo College, College of Saint Benilde, Mapua Institute of Technology, and Colegio de San Juan de Letran.

ABS-CBN S+A

August 21
3:00 p.m.

NCAA West All-Stars	89–88	NCAA East All-Stars
Scoring by quarter: 19–14, 22–24, 18–25, 30–25

Filoil Flying V Arena

- All-Star Game MVP: Jonathan Grey (Benilde Blazers)

Rosters	West NCAA All-Stars	East NCAA All-Stars
	Mark Cruz; Kevin Racal; Rey Nambatac; Jonathan Grey; Pons Saavedra; Jeffrey Ongteco; Francis Munsayac; Sydney Onwubere; Christ Mejos; Joseph Gabayni; Wilson Baltazar; Shaq Alanes; Allwell Oraeme; JP Nietes; Justin Serrano	Jio Jalalon; Zach Nicholls; Kent Sallado; Abdul Razak Abdul Wahab; Tey Teodoro; Jordan dela Paz; Michole Sorela; Arthur dela Cruz; Ryusei Koga; Jamil Ortuoste; Michael Calisaan; Bradwyn Guinto; Bright Akhuetie; Earl Thompson (replaced by John Ylagan); Gab Dalangon
	Coach: Aldin Ayo	Coach: Jamike Jarin

==== Side events winners ====
- 3-Point Shootout Champion: Mark Cruz (Letran Knights)
- Slam Dunk Champion: Jebb Bulawan (Perpetual Altas)
- Miss NCAA: Lyra Velchez (Perpetual Altas)
  - Miss NCAA 1st Runner-Up: Rycca Timog (Lyceum Pirates)
  - Miss NCAA 2nd Runner-Up: Zahara Soriano (Arellano Chiefs)

=== Awards ===
NCAA Season 91 men's basketball champions
Letran Knights
17th title

The awards were given prior to Game 1 of the Men's basketball finals on October 23, 2015, at the Mall of Asia Arena.

- Most Valuable Player: Allwell Oraeme (Mapúa Cardinals)
- Rookie of the Year: Allwell Oraeme (Mapúa Cardinals)
- Mythical Five:
  - Scottie Thompson (Perpetual Altas)
  - Jio Jalalon (Arellano Chiefs)
  - Arthur dela Cruz (San Beda Red Lions)
  - Bright Akhuetie (Perpetual Altas)
  - Allwell Oraeme (Mapúa Cardinals)
- Defensive Player of the Year: Allwell Oraeme (Mapúa Cardinals)
- All-Defensive Team:
  - Allwell Oraeme (Mapúa Cardinals)
  - Bradwyn Guinto (San Sebastian Stags)
  - Arthur dela Cruz (San Beda Red Lions)
  - Scottie Thompson (Perpetual Altas)
  - Bright Akhuetie (Perpetual Altas)
- Most Improved Player: Michael Calisaan (San Sebastian Stags)
- Coach of the Year: Aldin Ayo (Letran Knights)

=== Broadcast notes ===
==== Finals ====
Simulcast over ABS-CBN Sports and Action, The Filipino Channel or ABS-CBN Sports and Action International, and Balls HD 195 with replays on Balls and Balls HD 195.

Game	Play-by-play	Analyst	Courtside Reporters
Game 1	Anton Roxas	Olsen Racela	Myrtle Sarrosa and Ceej Tantengco
Game 2	Andrei Felix	Allan Gregorio	Roxanne Montealegre and Ceej Tantengco
Game 3	Anton Roxas	Allan Gregorio	Myrtle Sarrosa and Ceej Tantengco

Additional Game 3 crew:

- Award presenter: Andrei Felix

== Juniors' tournament ==
=== Elimination round ===
==== Team standings ====
Pos	Team	W	L	PCT	GB	Qualification
1	San Beda Red Cubs	18	0	1.000	—	Thrice-to-beat in the Finals (Note: As San Beda won all of their elimination round games, the stepladder format will be used instead of the regular Final Four format.)
2	Mapúa Red Robins (H)	16	2	.889	2	Proceed to stepladder round 2
3	Arellano Braves	12	6	.667	6	Proceed to stepladder round 1
4	La Salle Green Hills Greenies (Note: LSGH's first round win against Letran was forfeited after three of its players were ruled to be ineligible for wearing uniform numbers outside the league-mandated 4 to 19.)	11	7	.611 (Note: Fourth-seed playoff: LSGH 88–71 Lyceum)	7	Proceed to stepladder round 1
5	Lyceum Junior Pirates	11	7	.611	7	
6	EAC–ICA Brigadiers	9	9	.500	9	
7	Letran Squires	6	12	.333	12	
8	San Sebastian Staglets	4	14	.222	14	
9	JRU Light Bombers	2	16	.111	16	
10	Perpetual Junior Altas	1	17	.056	17	

Source: ABS-CBN Sports
Rules for classification: 1) winning percentage; 2) if tied for top 4, one-game playoff; 3) head-to-head record; 4) head-to-head point differential; 5) overall point differential
(H) Hosts

==== Match-up results ====
	Round 1									Round 2								
Team ╲ Game	1	2	3	4	5	6	7	8	9	10	11	12	13	14	15	16	17	18
AU	JRU school colors	Lyceum school colors	EAC school colors	Mapua school colors	SSC-R school colors	Letran school colors	UPHD school colors	CSB school colors	San Beda school colors	JRU school colors	CSB school colors	UPHD school colors	Lyceum school colors	SSC-R school colors	Mapua school colors	Letran school colors	San Beda school colors	EAC school colors
CSJL	CSB school colors	JRU school colors	SSC-R school colors	San Beda school colors	UPHD school colors	Arellano school colors	Lyceum school colors	EAC school colors	Mapua school colors	SSC-R school colors	EAC school colors	Lyceum school colors	CSB school colors	Mapua school colors	JRU school colors	Arellano school colors	San Beda school colors	UPHD school colors
EAC–ICA	San Beda school colors	CSB school colors	Arellano school colors	JRU school colors	Mapua school colors	SSC-R school colors	Letran school colors	UPHD school colors	Lyceum school colors	San Beda school colors	Letran school colors	CSB school colors	JRU school colors	SSC-R school colors	UPHD school colors	Lyceum school colors	Arellano school colors	Mapua school colors
JRU	Arellano school colors	Letran school colors	SSC-R school colors	EAC school colors	Lyceum school colors	CSB school colors	San Beda school colors	Mapua school colors	UPHD school colors	Arellano school colors	San Beda school colors	Mapua school colors	EAC school colors	CSB school colors	Letran school colors	UPHD school colors	Lyceum school colors	SSC-R school colors
LSGH	Letran school colors	UPHD school colors	EAC school colors	Lyceum school colors	San Beda school colors	JRU school colors	SSC-R school colors	Mapua school colors	Arellano school colors	San Beda school colors	Arellano school colors	EAC school colors	Letran school colors	JRU school colors	UPHD school colors	SSC-R school colors	Lyceum school colors	Mapua school colors
LPU–C	UPHD school colors	Arellano school colors	CSB school colors	San Beda school colors	JRU school colors	Mapua school colors	Letran school colors	SSC-R school colors	EAC school colors	SSC-R school colors	UPHD school colors	Letran school colors	Arellano school colors	Mapua school colors	San Beda school colors	EAC school colors	JRU school colors	CSB school colors
MHSS	San Beda school colors	SSC-R school colors	UPHD school colors	Arellano school colors	EAC school colors	Lyceum school colors	CSB school colors	JRU school colors	Letran school colors	UPHD school colors	SSC-R school colors	JRU school colors	Lyceum school colors	Letran school colors	Arellano school colors	San Beda school colors	CSB school colors	EAC school colors
SBC–R	Mapua school colors	EAC school colors	Letran school colors	Lyceum school colors	CSB school colors	UPHD school colors	JRU school colors	SSC-R school colors	Arellano school colors	EAC school colors	CSB school colors	JRU school colors	UPHD school colors	Lyceum school colors	SSC-R school colors	Mapua school colors	Arellano school colors	Letran school colors
SSC–R	Mapua school colors	JRU school colors	UPHD school colors	Letran school colors	Arellano school colors	EAC school colors	CSB school colors	Lyceum school colors	San Beda school colors	Letran school colors	Lyceum school colors	Mapua school colors	Arellano school colors	EAC school colors	San Beda school colors	CSB school colors	UPHD school colors	JRU school colors
UPHSD	Lyceum school colors	CSB school colors	Mapua school colors	SSC-R school colors	Letran school colors	San Beda school colors	Arellano school colors	EAC school colors	JRU school colors	Mapua school colors	Lyceum school colors	Arellano school colors	San Beda school colors	CSB school colors	EAC school colors	JRU school colors	SSC-R school colors	Letran school colors

= Win; = OT win; = Win by forfeit; = Loss; = OT loss; = Loss by forfeit

==== Scores ====
Team	AU	CSJL	EAC-ICA	JRU	LSGH	LPU-C	MHSS	SBC-R	SSC-R	UPHSD
Arellano Braves		89–71	104–98	103–34	69–90	97–88	76–69	81–86	82–64	85–69
Letran Squires	76–86		71–72	92–54	20–0 (Note: LSGH originally won 88–49; the NCAA Management Committee upheld Letran's protest of the game after three LSGH players were ineligible for wearing uniform numbers outside of the league-mandated 4 to 19.)	73–76	63–97	59–99	71–75	81–80*
EAC-ICA Brigadiers	74–92	87–77		111–73	61–72	79–76	80–88	78–84	81–67	88–62
JRU Light Bombers	52–99	65–69	69–93		57–86	73–81*	39–87	53–103	56–75	89–66
La Salle Green Hills Greenies	80–67	69–48	68–75	84–54		80–83	55–79	63–84	69–48	82–67
LPU Cavite Junior Pirates	77–100	91–83	95–90	87–63	66–81		64–76	81–91	88–82	78–59
Malayan Red Robins	86–73	73–43	90–74	83–62	64–57	85–63		63–80	80–51	87–51
San Beda Red Cubs	80–76	76–67	100–83	95–71	82–70	90–79	89–84		85–60	85–61
San Sebastian Staglets	99–72	73–78	84–83	66–70	57–87	49–78	64–86	57–88		87–58
Perpetual Junior Altas	66–100	52–74	72–73	51–77	58–83	74–88	46–95	53–109	60–55	

Legend: Blue = left column team win; Red = top row team win.
Matches with lighter background shading were decided after overtime.

=== Fourth seed playoff ===
October 13
12 noon

Lyceum Junior Pirates	71–88	La Salle Green Hills Greenies
La Salle advances to the Final Four

Mall of Asia Arena, Pasay

=== Bracket ===
Stepladder round 1 (Single-elimination)
3	Arellano	75
4	LSGH	74

Stepladder round 2 (Single-elimination)
2	Malayan	79
3	Arellano	85

Finals (No. 1 thrice-to-beat)
1	San Beda–Rizal	76	68	70
3	Arellano	68	72	61

=== Stepladder semifinals ===
The semifinals consists of two rounds of single-elimination.

==== (3) Arellano vs. (4) LSGH ====
October 16
2:00 p.m.

Arellano Braves	75–74	La Salle Green Hills Greenies
Arellano advances to the 2nd round

Mall of Asia Arena, Pasay

==== (2) Malayan vs. (3) Arellano ====
October 20
12 noon

Mapúa Red Robins	79–85	Arellano Braves
Arellano advances to the Finals

Mall of Asia Arena, Pasay

=== Finals ===
Since San Beda swept the elimination round, the Finals is a de facto best of five series with San Beda automatically leading 1–0. Therefore, San Beda has to win twice, while Arellano needed thrice, to win the championship.

October 23
12 noon

San Beda Red Cubs	76–68	Arellano Braves

Mall of Asia Arena, Pasay

October 27
2:00 p.m.

San Beda Red Cubs	68–72	Arellano Braves

Mall of Asia Arena, Pasay

October 29
2:00 p.m.

San Beda Red Cubs	70–61	Arellano Braves
San Beda wins series in three games

Mall of Asia Arena, Pasay

- Finals Most Valuable Player: Evan Nelle (San Beda Red Cubs)

Arellano snapped San Beda's 19-game winning streak on game 2. In game 3, San Beda won its seventh consecutive championship.

=== Awards ===
NCAA Season 91 juniors' basketball champions
San Beda Red Cubs
22nd title, seventh consecutive title

- Most Valuable Player: Michael Enriquez (Mapúa Red Robins)
- Mythical Five:
  - Michael Enriquez (Mapúa Red Robins)
  - Sherwin Concepcion (San Beda Red Cubs)
  - Samuel Abu Hijle (San Beda Red Cubs)
  - Guilmer dela Torre (Arellano Braves)
  - Carlo Abadeza (Arellano Braves)
- Defensive Player of the Year: John Anthony Umali (Perpetual Junior Altas)
- Rookie of the Year: Lars Sunga (Arellano Braves)
- Most Improved Player: Maui Cruz (EAC–ICA Brigadiers)
- Coach of the Year: JB Sison (San Beda Red Cubs)

=== Controversies ===
==== Wrong uniform ====
The NCAA Management Committee, chaired by Melchor Divina of Mapua, upheld the recommendation of commissioner Arturo Cristobal forfeiting La Salle-Greenhills’ 88–49 victory over Letran. LSGH's Jesmar Pedrosa, Alain Madrigal and Ladis Lepalam wore Nos. 20, 28 and 27, respectively, which violated a league rule limiting the use of jersey numbers to Nos. 4 to 19.

== See also ==
- UAAP Season 78 basketball tournaments

Preceded by Season 90 (2014)	NCAA basketball seasons Season 91 (2015)	Succeeded by Season 92 (2016)
