= NCAA Season 97 men's basketball tournament =

Basketball season

NCAA Season 97
- "Stronger Together. Buo ang Puso"
- Host school: De La Salle–College of Saint Benilde
| Men's Finals | G1 | G2 | Wins |
|---|---|---|---|
| Letran Knights | 68 | 75 | 2 |
| Mapúa Cardinals | 63 | 65 | 0 |
- Duration: May 15 to 22, 2022
- Arena(s): Filoil Flying V Arena
- Finals MVP: Jeo Ambohot
- Winning coach: Bonnie Tan (2nd title)
- Semifinalists: San Beda Red Lions; Perpetual Altas
- TV network(s): GMA

The NCAA Season 97 men's basketball tournament was the basketball tournaments of the National Collegiate Athletic Association (Philippines) for its 2021–22 season. This was the first tournament since the COVID-19 pandemic in the Philippines, and since 2019 after the planned 96th season was cancelled because of the pandemic. Only the men's tournament for college students was held; the juniors' tournament for senior high school students last held in 2019 was canceled.

The Letran Knights won all games to become champions undefeated, defeating the Mapua Cardinals in the finals. Rhenz Abando was named season MVP.

== Tournament format ==
The season will be held with five gamedays a week calendar, with two games being played in each gameday. These gamedays are scheduled from Tuesday to Sundays.

- Round robin tournament
- Teams will be ranked by winning percentage.
- Top two teams will be given the twice-to-beat advantage in the semifinals. Next four teams will participate in the play-in tournament.
  - Third and fourth placed teams will play for the third seed
  - Fifth and sixth placed teams will play for a berth in the fourth seed playoff, to face the loser of the third seed playoff.
- The finals shall be a best-of-three series.

== Teams ==
All ten schools are participating.

| Team | College | Men's coach |
|---|---|---|
| Arellano Chiefs | Arellano University (AU) | (Philippines) Cholo Martin |
| Letran Knights | Colegio de San Juan de Letran (CSJL) | (Philippines) Bonnie Tan |
| Benilde Blazers | De La Salle–College of Saint Benilde (CSB) | (Philippines) Charles Tiu |
| EAC Generals | Emilio Aguinaldo College (EAC) | (Philippines) Oliver Bunyi |
| JRU Heavy Bombers | José Rizal University (JRU) | (Philippines) Louie Gonzalez |
| Lyceum Pirates | Lyceum of the Philippines University (LPU) | (Philippines) Gilbert Malabanan |
| Mapúa Cardinals | Mapúa University (MU) | (Philippines) Randy Alcantara |
| San Beda Red Lions | San Beda University (SBU) | (Philippines) Boyet Fernandez |
| San Sebastian Stags | San Sebastian College – Recoletos (SSC-R) | (Philippines) Edgar Macaraya |
| Perpetual Altas | University of Perpetual Help System DALTA (UPHSD) | (Philippines) Myk Saguiguit |

=== Coaching changes ===
| Team | Outgoing coach | Manner of departure | Date | Replaced by | Date |
|---|---|---|---|---|---|
| Perpetual Altas | (Philippines) Frankie Lim | Resignation | September 16, 2020 | (Philippines) Myk Saguiguit | December 1, 2020 |
| Lyceum Pirates | (Philippines) Topex Robinson | Signed by Phoenix Super LPG Fuel Masters | September 12, 2020 | (Philippines) Jeff Perlas | October 6, 2020 |
| Benilde Blazers | (Philippines) Ty Tang | End of contract | June 18, 2021 | (Philippines) Charles Tiu | December 2, 2021 |
| Lyceum Pirates | (Philippines) Jeff Perlas | Resignation | December 13, 2021 | (Philippines) Gilbert Malabanan | December 13, 2021 |

== Venues ==
Venues in Metro Manila.

St. Benilde Gym in La Salle Green Hills (LSGH), Mandaluyong is the exclusive venue of the tournament. All games will be held behind closed doors, with teams being transported to LSGH from their schools every game day.

In April, the NCAA announced that fans will be allowed back to watch the games at the venue for the last game day of the elimination round, the play-in tournament, semifinals, and finals, which was held at the Filoil Flying V Centre in San Juan.

== Squads ==
Each NCAA team can have up to 15 players on their roster.

Starting this season, all teams in all sports are banned from including foreigners in their rosters. Squads were released on March 22.

== Elimination round ==
=== Team standings ===
| Pos | Team | W | L | PCT | GB | Qualification |
|---|---|---|---|---|---|---|
| 1 | Letran Knights | 9 | 0 | 1.000 | — | Twice-to-beat in the semifinals |
| 2 | Mapúa Cardinals | 7 | 2 | .778 (Note: Head-to-head record: Mapúa 1–0 San Beda) | 2 | Twice-to-beat in the semifinals |
| 3 | San Beda Red Lions | 7 | 2 | .778 | 2 | Advance to third seed playoff |
| 4 | Benilde Blazers (H) | 5 | 4 | .556 | 4 | Advance to third seed playoff |
| 5 | Perpetual Altas | 4 | 5 | .444 (Note: Head-to-head record: Perpetual 1–0 Arellano) | 5 | Proceed to qualifying playoff |
| 6 | Arellano Chiefs | 4 | 5 | .444 | 5 | Proceed to qualifying playoff |
| 7 | EAC Generals | 3 | 6 | .333 (Note: Head-to-head record: EAC 1–0 San Sebastian) | 6 | |
| 8 | San Sebastian Stags | 3 | 6 | .333 | 6 | |
| 9 | Lyceum Pirates | 2 | 7 | .222 | 7 | |
| 10 | JRU Heavy Bombers | 1 | 8 | .111 | 8 | |

Source: GMA Network-NCAA Philippines
Rules for classification: 1) winning percentage; 2) head-to-head record; 3) head-to-head point differential; 4) overall point differential
(H) Hosts

=== Match-up results ===
| Team ╲ Game | 1 | 2 | 3 | 4 | 5 | 6 | 7 | 8 | 9 |
|---|---|---|---|---|---|---|---|---|---|
| Arellano | SSC-R school colors | Letran school colors | CSB school colors | UPHD school colors | Mapua school colors | San Beda school colors | Lyceum school colors | EAC school colors | JRU school colors |
| Letran | CSB school colors | Arellano school colors | UPHD school colors | Mapua school colors | Lyceum school colors | EAC school colors | JRU school colors | SSC-R school colors | San Beda school colors |
| Benilde | Letran school colors | Lyceum school colors | Arellano school colors | EAC school colors | UPHD school colors | JRU school colors | Mapua school colors | SSC-R school colors | San Beda school colors |
| EAC | Mapua school colors | San Beda school colors | Lyceum school colors | CSB school colors | JRU school colors | SSC-R school colors | Letran school colors | Arellano school colors | UPHD school colors |
| JRU | UPHD school colors | Mapua school colors | San Beda school colors | Lyceum school colors | EAC school colors | CSB school colors | SSC-R school colors | Letran school colors | Arellano school colors |
| Lyceum | San Beda school colors | CSB school colors | EAC school colors | JRU school colors | SSC-R school colors | Letran school colors | Arellano school colors | UPHD school colors | Mapua school colors |
| Mapúa | EAC school colors | JRU school colors | SSC-R school colors | Letran school colors | Arellano school colors | UPHD school colors | CSB school colors | San Beda school colors | Lyceum school colors |
| San Beda | Lyceum school colors | EAC school colors | JRU school colors | SSC-R school colors | Arellano school colors | UPHD school colors | Mapua school colors | CSB school colors | Letran school colors |
| San Sebastian | Arellano school colors | UPHD school colors | Mapua school colors | San Beda school colors | Lyceum school colors | EAC school colors | JRU school colors | CSB school colors | Letran school colors |
| Perpetual | JRU school colors | SSC-R school colors | Letran school colors | Arellano school colors | CSB school colors | Mapua school colors | San Beda school colors | Lyceum school colors | EAC school colors |

Updated to match(es) played on April 29, 2022. Source: GMA Network-NCAA Philippines
= Win; = OT win; = Loss; = OT loss

=== Scores ===
Results on top and to the right of the dashes are for first-round games.

| Teams | AU | CSJL | CSB | EAC | JRU | LPU | MU | SBU | SSC-R | UPHSD |
|---|---|---|---|---|---|---|---|---|---|---|
| Arellano Chiefs | — | 67–96 | 71–76 | 70–55 | 65–62 | 66–70 | 72–63 | 68–82 | 65–63 | 70–87 |
| Letran Knights | | — | 67–63 | 83–62 | 81–59 | 80–77 | 80–60 | 59–56 | 73–69 | 68–57 |
| Benilde Blazers | | | — | 78–68 | 68–74 | 79–68 | 65–84 | 63–67 | 71–62 | 83–73 |
| EAC Generals | | | | — | 80–65 | 70–69 | 67–73 | 81–85 | 63–60 | 60–63 |
| JRU Heavy Bombers | | | | | — | 75–82 | 56–59 | 53–67 | 64–70 | 56–77 |
| Lyceum Pirates | | | | | | — | 65–75 | 76–84 | 71–83 | 69–72 |
| Mapúa Cardinals | | | | | | | — | 68–54 | 65–59 | 95–83 |
| San Beda Red Lions | | | | | | | | — | 61–60 | 78–71 |
| San Sebastian Stags | | | | | | | | | — | 63–58 |
| Perpetual Altas | | | | | | | | | | — |

Updated to match(es) played on April 29, 2022. Source: GMA Network
Legend: Blue = left column team win; Red = top row team win.
Matches with lighter background shading were decided after overtime.

== Play-in tournament ==
Play-in games
Third seed playoff
3 | San Beda | 63
4 | Benilde | 57
Qualifying playoff
5 | Perpetual | 59
6 | Arellano | 52

Fourth seed playoff
4 | Benilde | 64
5 | Perpetual | 76

=== Third seed playoff ===
This is between the teams that finished 3rd and 4th after the elimination round; the winner is the #3 seed and advances to the semifinals against the #2 seed, while the loser is relegated to the fourth seed playoff.

GTV

May 1
12:00 p.m.

Boxscore

| San Beda Red Lions | 63–57 | Benilde Blazers |
Scoring by quarter: 18–7, 8–13, 14–17, 23–20
| Pts: James Kwekuteye 17; Rebs: JB Bahio 10; Asts: Alfaro, Cortez, 4 each | | Pts: Robi Nayve 10; Rebs: Will Gozum 11; Asts: Robi Nayve 3 |
San Beda advances to the semifinals

Filoil Flying V Centre, San Juan

=== Qualifying playoff ===
This is between the teams that finished 5th and 6th after the elimination round; the winner advances to the fourth seed playoff, while the loser is eliminated.

GTV

May 1
3:00 p.m.

Boxscore

| Perpetual Altas | 59–52 | Arellano Chiefs |
Scoring by quarter: 13–14, 12–10, 19–19, 15–9
| Pts: Kim Aurin 16; Rebs: Mark Omega 9 Asts: Jielo Razon 6 | | Pts: Jordan Sta. Ana 12; Rebs: Justin Arana 17; Asts: Maui Cruz 4 |
Perpetual advances to the fourth seed playoff

Filoil Flying V Centre, San Juan

=== Fourth seed playoff ===
The winner is the #4 seed and advances to the semifinals against the #1 seed.

GTV

May 4
3:00 p.m.

Boxscore

| Benilde Blazers | 64–76 | Perpetual Altas |
Scoring by quarter: 14–21, 18–19, 15–19, 17–17
| Pts: JC Cullar 18; Rebs: Will Gozum 13; Asts: Robi Nayve 3 | | Pts: John Abis 14; Rebs: Jielo Razon 11; Asts: John Abis 5 |
Perpetual advances to the Final Four

Filoil Flying V Centre, San Juan

== Bracket ==
Semifinals (Top 2 twice-to-beat)
1 | Letran | 77
4 | Perpetual | 75
2 | Mapúa | 67 | 70
3 | San Beda | 73* | 67

Finals (Best-of-three series)
1 | Letran | 68 | 75
2 | Mapúa | 63 | 65

*Overtime

== Semifinals ==
The top 2 seeded teams have the twice-to-beat advantage. In case a team wins all elimination round games, the stepladder format won't be used since the elimination round is shortened to just one round instead of the usual two.

=== (1) Letran vs. (4) Perpetual ===
This is the first meeting between Letran and Perpetual in the playoffs. Letran qualified to its third consecutive playoffs, while Perpetual returned to the playoffs after missing out the 2019 tournament.

GTV

May 8
12:00 p.m.

Boxscore

| Letran Knights | 77–75 | Perpetual Altas |
Scoring by quarter: 20–17, 16–22, 26–16, 15–20
| Pts: Rhenz Abando 24; Rebs: Jeo Ambohot 14; Asts: Reyson, Yu 3 each | | Pts: Jielo Razon 21; Rebs: Jielo Razon 11; Asts: Jielo Razon 4 |
Letran wins series in one game

Filoil Flying V Centre, San Juan

=== (2) Mapúa vs. (3) San Beda ===
This is the first meeting between Mapúa and San Beda in the semifinals since 2008 and fourth overall. Meanwhile, this is Mapúa's first semifinals appearance since 2016 and the first time they have the twice-to-beat advantage. while it will be the first time since 2005 when San Beda does not have the twice-to-beat advantage.

GTV

May 8
3:00 p.m.

Boxscore

| Mapúa Cardinals | 67–73 (OT) | San Beda Red Lions |
Scoring by quarter: 12–6, 13–19, 16–8, 19–27, Overtime: 7–13
| Pts: Warren Bonifacio 18; Rebs: Warren Bonifacio 13; Asts: Brian Lacap 4 | | Pts: James Kwekuteye 17; Rebs: JB Bahio 13; Asts: James Kwekuteye 4 |

Filoil Flying V Centre, San Juan

GTV

May 11
3:00 p.m.

Boxscore

| Mapúa Cardinals | 70–67 | San Beda Red Lions |
Scoring by quarter: 9–9, 18–15, 21–25, 22–18
| Pts: Gamboa, Lacap 13 each Rebs: Arvin Gamboa 10; Asts: Nocum, Pido 3 each | | Pts: Yukien Andrada 19; Rebs: JB Bahio 15; Asts: James Kwekuteye 4 |
Mapúa wins series in two games

Filoil Flying V Centre, San Juan

== Finals ==
The finals is a best-of-three series. This is the first meeting between Letran and Mapúa in the finals during the Final Four era, the first since 1979 where Letran won the title, and is a part of the Battle of Intramuros rivalry, so named after the district of Manila both schools are located at. Letran is in its second consecutive finals appearance, while Mapúa is in its first finals appearance since 1995.

GMA
GTV

May 15
3:00 p.m.

Boxscore

| Letran Knights | 68–63 | Mapúa Cardinals |
Scoring by quarter: 15–24, 17–15, 17–15, 19–9
| Pts: Paraiso, Sangalang 14 each Rebs: Jeo Ambohot 13; Asts: Paraiso, Yu 5 each | | Pts: Bonifacio, Gamboa 10 each Rebs: Warren Bonifacio 14; Asts: Adrian Nocum 6 |

Filoil Flying V Centre, San Juan

GMA
GTV

May 22
3:00 p.m.

Boxscore

| Letran Knights | 75–65 | Mapúa Cardinals |
Scoring by quarter: 19–8, 20–15, 19–25, 17–17
| Pts: Rhenz Abando 14; Rebs: Louie Sangalang 13; Asts: Fran Yu 5 | | Pts: Paolo Hernandez 14; Rebs: Warren Bonifacio 10; Asts: Paolo Hernandez 5 |
Letran wins series, 2–0

Filoil Flying V Centre, San Juan

- Finals Most Valuable Player: Jeo Ambohot (Letran Knights)
- Coach of the Year: Bonnie Tan (Letran Knights)

== All-Star Game ==
An all-star game pattered after the NBA All-Star Game was held after the tournament. It included 2 teams, "Team Saints" or the schools named after Catholic saints and figures, and "Team Heroes", for those named after Filipino dignitaries and heroes. Each team has two all-stars from each school, and several male contract stars of Sparkle, GMA's talent agency.

GTV

June 5, 2022

| Team Heroes | 109–109 | Team Saints |

Filoil Flying V Centre, San Juan

- All-Star Game MVP: Enoch Valdez (Team Heroes)
- Celebrity MVP: Jose Sarasola (Team Saints)

== Awards ==
NCAA Season 97 men's basketball champions
Letran Knights
19th title, second consecutive title

The awards were given prior to Game 2 of the men's Finals.

- Most Valuable Player: Rhenz Abando (Letran Knights)
- Rookie of the Year: Rhenz Abando (Letran Knights)
- Mythical Five:
  - Rhenz Abando (Letran Knights)
  - Jeo Ambohot (Letran Knights)
  - Justin Arana (Arellano Chiefs)
  - JM Calma (San Sebastian Stags)
  - Will Gozum (Benilde Blazers)
- Defensive Player of the Year: Justin Arana (Arellano Chiefs)
- All-Defensive Team:
  - Jeo Ambohot (Letran Knights)
  - Justin Arana (Arellano Chiefs)
  - Will Gozum (Benilde Blazers)
  - Omar Larupay (Lyceum Pirates)
  - JM Calma (San Sebastian Stags)
  - Nat Cosejo (EAC Generals)
- Most Improved Player: Paolo Hernandez (Mapúa Cardinals)
- Sportsmanship Award: Perpetual Altas

== Statistical leaders ==
=== Game player highs ===
| Statistic | Player | Team | Total | Opponent |
|---|---|---|---|---|
| Points | Ralph Robin | EAC Generals | 27 | San Sebastian Stags |
| Rebounds | Justin Arana | Arellano Chiefs | 29 | JRU Heavy Bombers |
| Assists | JL delos Santos | JRU Heavy Bombers | 9 | Arellano Chiefs |
| Steals | Axel Doromal | Arellano Chiefs | 7 | Perpetual Altas |
| Blocks | Louie Sangalang | Letran Knights | 5 | Perpetual Altas |

=== Season player highs ===
This were for games played during the elimination round.

| Statistic | Player | Team | Average |
|---|---|---|---|
| Points | JM Calma | San Sebastian Stags | 16.9 |
| Rebounds | Justin Arana | Arellano Chiefs | 17.13 |
| Assists | Renzo Navarro | Lyceum Pirates | 4.7 |
| Steals | Axel Doromal | Arellano Chiefs | 2.1 |
| Blocks | Justin Arana | Arellano Chiefs | 2.9 |

== See also ==
- UAAP Season 84 basketball tournaments

| Preceded by Season 95 (2019) | NCAA basketball seasons Season 97 (2021) | Succeeded by Season 98 (2022) |
