= Lyceum Pirates basketball =

Lyceum Pirates
2026 Lyceum Pirates basketball team
- University: Lyceum of the Philippines University
- Head coach: Jamike Jarin (1st season)
- Location: Intramuros, Manila
- Nickname: Pirates
- Colors: International Red and Gray

PCCL Champion
- 2017

ISAA Champion
- 2009, 2010

The Lyceum Pirates basketball program represents Lyceum of the Philippines University (LPU) in men's basketball as a member of the National Collegiate Athletic Association (Philippines) (NCAA). The Lyceum Pirates previously co-founded the Inter-Scholastic Athletic Association (ISAA).

== History ==
=== Run at MUCAA ===
Leo Austria and Dante Gonzalgo played for Lyceum while it was a member of the now defunct Manila Universities and Colleges Athletic Association (MUCAA) in the late 1970s and early 1980s.

=== Stint with NCRAA ===
The Lyceum Pirates previously saw the likes of Gary David and Chico Lanete play for the Intramuros-based school. Playing at the National Capital Region Athletic Association (NCRAA), Bai Cristobal coached Lyceum at this time. The Pirates were defeated by the St. Francis Doves in the 2003 finals.

=== ISAA champions ===
Coached by Bonnie Tan starting in 2003, the Pirates won two undefeated championships in the ISAA, and two runs to the Sweet 16 in the Philippine Collegiate Champions League (PCCL).

=== Entry to the NCAA ===
Lyceum then entered the NCAA as a guest team in 2011, and was admitted as a regular member in 2015. Tan resigned as coach in 2014, and was replaced by Topex Robinson. They would first make it to the playoffs in 2017 when CJ Perez led them to an 18–0 elimination round record, only to lose in the finals to the San Beda Red Lions. The Pirates defeated the Red Lions for the championship though in the postseason 2017 PCCL. They would meet in an NCAA Finals rematch as a #2 seed with the Red Lions in the next season, but still lost. The championship series saw Perez suspended in Game 1 for failing to notify the NCAA of his intentions to join the 2018 PBA Draft.

The Pirates then finished second in 2019, but lost to eventual champions Letran Knights in the playoffs. After being appointed as head coach of the Philippine Basketball Association's Phoenix Fuel Masters in 2018, Robinson was replaced by Jeff Perlas. Perlas himself didn't coach the Pirates in an NCAA game as he resigned for personal reasons in 2021; he was replaced by Gilbert Malabanan. Malabanan coached the Pirates in the 2021 bubble season to 2–7 record, way off the play-in tournament places. The Pirates made it to the playoffs in the 2022 season, losing out to Letran in the semifinals. They made it to Final Four the following 2023 season with a twice to beat advantage as the second seed but lost both games to the eventual champions San Beda and the Benilde Blazers in the first battle for third place in NCAA basketball history.

== Current roster ==
NCAA Season 102

Lyceum Pirates roster
Players
Coaches

Pos.	No.	Nat.	Name	Height	Year	High School
SF	19	(Philippines)	Almario, James	6'0" (1.83m)	–	–
PF	34	(Philippines)	Aurigue, Lance	6'5" (1.96m)	–	–
C	29	(Philippines)	Aviles, Genesis	6'5" (1.96m)	–	St Jude College Dasmariñas Cavite
F	11	(Philippines)	Caduyac, Khen	5'9" (1.75m)	–	Lyceum of the Philippines University – Cavite
PF	18	(Philippines)	Cardinas, Iven	6'4" (1.93m)	–	–
SG	28	(Philippines)	Daileg, Jonathan	6'4" (1.93m)	–	–
SG	27	(Philippines)	Fuentes, Nath	6'0" (1.83m)	–	–
SF	5	(Canada)	Gordon, Omar	6'1" (1.85m)	–	–
TC	7	(Philippines)	Guadaña, McLaude (C)	5'11" (1.8m)	–	Lyceum of the Philippines University – Cavite
PG	33	(Philippines)	Manuel, Axl	5'11" (1.8m)	–	–
F	12	(Philippines)	Matienzo, Jasper	6'3" (1.91m)	–	–
SG SF	2	(Philippines)	Nocum, Carl	6'1" (1.85m)	–	–
PF	22	(Philippines)	Ondoa, Roger	6'3" (1.91m)	–	–
PG	10	(Philippines)	Pallingayan, Iyon	5'8" (1.73m)	–	–
C	14	(Philippines)	Panelo, JD	6'4" (1.93m)	–	–
SG	1	(Philippines)	Peñafiel, Simon	6'1" (1.85m)	–	Our Lady of Fatima University
PG	26	(Philippines)	Rubico, Matthew	5'11" (1.8m)	–	–
PG	20	(Philippines)	Villegas, Renz Adrian	5'8" (1.73m)	–	Colegio de San Juan de Letran

Head coach

- (Philippines) Jamike Jarin

Assistant coach(es)

- (Philippines) M.C. Caceres
- (Philippines) Neville Gido
- (Philippines) John Lopez
- (Philippines) Ian Anthony Sangco
- (Philippines) Christien dela Cruz
- (Philippines) Jjay Alejandro
- (Philippines) RR Garcia
- (Philippines) Ryan Dy
- (Philippines) Anthony Miano
- (Philippines) Al Vergara

Legend

- (C) Team captain
- Injured

- Roster
Updated: 2024-09-03

== Head coaches ==
- c. 2003: Bai Cristobal
- 2003–2014: Bonnie Tan
- 2014–2020: Topex Robinson
- 2021–2025: Gilbert Malabanan
- 2026–present: Jamike Jarin

== Season-by-season records ==
Season	League	Elimination round						Playoffs			
Season	League	Pos	GP	W	L	PCT	GB	GP	W	L	Results
2009	ISAA										Won Finals
2010	ISAA										Won Finals
2011	ISAA										Lost Finals vs TIP
2011	NCAA	6th/10	18	7	11	.389	9	Did not qualify			
2012	NCAA	10th/10	18	3	15	.167	12	Did not qualify			
2013	NCAA	7th/10	18	8	10	.444	7	Did not qualify			
2014	NCAA	7th/10	18	7	11	.389	6	Did not qualify			
2015	NCAA	9th/10	18	4	14	.222	9	Did not qualify			
2016	NCAA	9th/10	18	6	12	.333	8	Did not qualify			
2017	NCAA	1st/10	18	18	0	1.000	—	2	0	2	Lost Finals vs San Beda
2018	NCAA	2nd/10	18	15	3	.833	2	3	1	2	Lost Finals vs San Beda
2019	NCAA	2nd/10	18	13	5	.722	5	1	0	1	Lost stepladder round 2 vs Letran
2020 (Note: Season cancelled due to the COVID-19 pandemic.)	NCAA	Season canceled									
2021 (Note: Season postponed to early 2022 due to the COVID-19 pandemic.)	NCAA	9th/10	9	2	7	.222	7	Did not qualify			
2022	NCAA	3rd/10	18	12	6	.667	2	1	0	1	Lost semifinals vs Letran
2023	NCAA	2nd/10	18	13	5	.722	2	3	0	3	Lost 3rd place playoff vs Benilde
2024	NCAA	4th/10	18	10	8	.556	5	1	0	1	Lost semifinals vs Mapua
2025	NCAA	4th/5	13	3	10	.231	6	2	1	1	Lost quarterfinals vs San Beda
2026	NCAA	5th/5	13	4	9	.308	6	1	0	1	Lost play-in vs Mapua
ISAA totals							—				2 championships
NCAA totals			251	125	126	.498	—	13	2	12	6 playoffs appearances

== Honors ==
=== Team honors ===
- Philippine Collegiate Champions League
  - Champions (1): 2017
- Inter-Scholastic Athletic Association
  - Champions (2): 2009, 2010

=== Player honors ===
- PCCL Most Valuable Player:
  - Jaycee Marcelino (1): 2017
- NCAA Most Valuable Player
  - CJ Perez (1): 2017
- NCAA Rookie of the Year
  - Mike Harry Nzeusseu: 2016
  - Jaycee Marcelino: 2017
- NCAA Defensive Player of the Year
  - Joseph Gabayni (1): 2014
- NCAA Most Improved Player
  - Shawn Umali (1): 2022
- NCAA Best Defensive Foreign Player
  - Mike Harry Nzeusseu (1): 2019
