= Arellano Chiefs basketball =

Arellano Chiefs
2026 Arellano Chiefs basketball team
- University: Arellano University
- History: Arellano Flaming Arrows (until 2006); Arellano Chiefs (since 2006)
- Head coach: Chico Manabat (4th season)
- Location: Legarda Street, Manila
- Nickname: Chiefs
- Colors: Blue, Red, and Gray

National Intercollegiate Champions
- 1983

NCRAA Champions
- 2006, 2007

The Arellano Chiefs basketball program represents Arellano University in men's basketball as a member of the National Collegiate Athletic Association (Philippines) (NCAA). Originally the Arellano Flaming Arrows, the Arellano Chiefs have previously played in the National Capital Region Athletic Association (NCRAA), winning two consecutive championships from 2007 and 2008. The Chiefs transferred to the NCAA in 2010, and have qualified to two Finals appearances, in 2014 and 2016, losing each time to the defending champions San Beda Red Lions.

== History ==
=== Beginnings ===
The Arellano Flaming Arrows won the Basketball Association of the Philippines-organized National Student's Championship in the 1970s. The Flaming Arrows, coached by Cholo Martin and led by Joey Loyzaga, defeated the De La Salle Green Archers in the 1983 National Intercollegiate Championship. In 2006, the Flaming Arrows were named into the Chiefs, in honor of Cayetano Arellano, the first Chief Justice of the Philippines and university's namesake.

=== NCRAA stint ===
In 2006, the Chiefs lost out to the St. Francis Doves in the NCRAA Finals. On the next year, they defeated the EAC Generals to win their first NCRAA title off the heroics of Gio Ciriacruz. The Chiefs then defeated the Doves in the next season's Finals.

In the 2009 campaign they were defeated by the Universal College Golden Dragons in the finals. Arellano sought to enter the NCAA in time for the 2009–10 season, but the association deferred in accepting new members. The NCAA instead invited three schools, including Arellano as guest teams.

=== Entry to the NCAA ===
The Chiefs ended up with the best record among the three guest teams. In 2014, led by Jio Jalalon and coach Jerry Codiñera, the Chiefs qualified to its first Finals appearance. They were swept by the four-time defending champions San Beda Red Lions. On the next year, the Chiefs missed the Final Four, but returned to the Finals in 2016. In a rematch of the 2014 Finals, the Chiefs were again swept by San Beda. Two years later, the Chiefs struggled on the floor and had a losing season. Codiñera resigned and replaced by Junjie Ablan.

On the next campaign the university rehired Cholo Martin as its new coach. Martin's best season came in the 2021 bubble season played in early 2022, where they were eliminated in the play-in tournament by the Perpetual Altas. The Chiefs missed the playoffs in 2022; Martin was fired and was replaced by Chico Manabat. By his third season as head coach, the Chiefs posted their first winning record since Season 93 with a 7-6 record, a 2nd place finish in group A and a twice-to-beat advantage in the quarterfinals against the Letran Knights but lost both games.

== Current roster ==
CHIEFS NCAA Season 102

Arellano Chiefs roster
Players
Coaches

Pos.	No.	Nat.	Name	Height	Year	High School
G	12	(Philippines)	Abiera, Renzo	6'4" (1.93m)	–	NUNS
G	13	(Philippines)	Cabotaje, Anjord	5'11" (1.8m)	–	–
G	19	(Philippines)	Anama, Kyle Matthew	6'2" (1.88m)	–	–
G	25	(Philippines)	Borromeo, Anthony	6'0" (1.83m)	–	–
C	10	(Philippines)	Buenaventura, Leyton	6'5" (1.96m)	–	–
PG	9	(Philippines)	Camay, Yuan Jerico	5'10" (1.78m)	–	–
G	0	(Philippines)	Manansala, Aaron Dywane	6'0" (1.83m)	–	–
PG	16	(Philippines)	De Leon, Joaquim	5'11" (1.8m)	–	–
F	17	(Philippines)	Flores, Karl	6'4" (1.93m)	–	–
PG	3	(Philippines)	Geronimo, Ernest	5'11" (1.8m)	–	–
F	42	(Philippines)	Hernal, Joseph	6'2" (1.88m)	–	–
PG	7	(Philippines)	Langit, Matthew	6'0" (1.83m)	–	–
C	4	(Philippines)	Libang, Charles	6'5" (1.96m)	–	–
G	20	(Philippines)	Barraca, Prince	6'1" (1.85m)	–	–
PG	1	(Philippines)	Ongotan, T-Mc	5'9" (1.75m)	–	–
F	5	(Philippines)	Valencia, Sebastian	6'4" (1.93m)	–	San Beda University
F	14	(Philippines)	Vinoya, King (C)	6'4" (1.93m)	–	–
G	41	(Philippines)	Ladica, John Ray	6'1" (1.85m)	–	–

Head coach

- (Philippines) Chico Manabat

Assistant coach(es)

- (Philippines) Tim Taclas
- (Philippines) Jun Cuevas
- (Philippines) Benedict Pejo
- (Philippines) Gilbert Neo
- (Philippines) Paolo Atinaja
- (Philippines) Manny Dandan
- (Philippines) Kenyon Chee
- (Philippines) Ric Gulapa
- (Philippines) Jesse Mapanao
- (Philippines) Anthony Urbano
- (Philippines) Andy Vergara

Legend

- (C) Team captain
- Injured

BRAVES NCAA Season 102

Arellano Braves roster
Players
Coaches

Pos.	No.	Nat.	Name	Height	Year	High School
PG	1	(Philippines)	Castro, Hance	5'10" (1.78m)	–	–
G	2	(Philippines)	Acain, Mathew	–	–	–
PG	3	(Philippines)	Barinque, Kin	5'7" (1.7m)	–	–
G	5	(Philippines)	Garing, Kyle	5'7" (1.7m)	–	–
PG	6	(Philippines)	Trinos, Kyle	–	–	–
F	8	(Philippines)	Ferriols, Hugo	6'2" (1.88m)	–	–
G	9	(Philippines)	Mabbayad, Mathaniel	–	–	–
G	10	(Philippines)	Langit, Derrek	–	–	–
G	11	(Philippines)	Cabantac, Angelo	–	–	–
F	13	(Philippines)	Lugo, Angelo	6'3" (1.91m)	–	–
F	15	(Philippines)	Tan, Prince	–	–	–
G	16	(Philippines)	Pillas, Laurence (C)	5'11" (1.8m)	–	–
G	19	(Philippines)	Sapo, Jermaine	6'0" (1.83m)	–	–
C	22	(Philippines)	Teoc, Tristan	–	–	–
F	28	(Philippines)	Dalaten, Zaqueo	6'1" (1.85m)	–	–
G	31	(Philippines)	Angeles, Thadeus	5'4" (1.63m)	–	–
PG	33	(Philippines)	Garan, Ronie	–	–	–
C	47	(Philippines)	Asay, Ian	6'4" (1.93m)	–	–

Head coach

Anthony Urbano

Legend

- (C) Team captain
- Injured

== Head coaches ==
- c. 1983: Loreto Carbonell
- 1980s: Cholo Martin
- 2010–2011: Leo Isaac
- 2011: Junjie Ablan
- 2012–13: Koy Banal
- 2013–18: Jerry Codiñera
  - 2018: Junjie Ablan (interim)
- 2018–2022: Cholo Martin
- 2023–present: Chico Manabat

== Season-by-season records ==
Season	League	Elimination round						Playoffs			
Season	League	Pos	GP	W	L	PCT	GB	GP	W	L	Results
2004–05	NCRAA										
2005–06	NCRAA										Lost Finals vs St. Francis
2006–07	NCRAA	2nd	10	7	3	.700	2	3	3	0	Won Finals vs EAC
2007–08	NCRAA										Won Finals vs St. Francis
2008–09	NCRAA										Lost Finals vs UCN
2009	NCAA	5th/10	18	8	10	.444	8	Did not qualify			
2010	NCAA	6th/9	16	6	10	.375	10	Did not qualify			
2011	NCAA	7th/10	18	6	12	.333	10	Did not qualify			
2012	NCAA	8th/10	18	6	12	.333	9	Did not qualify			
2013	NCAA	6th/10	18	8	10	.444	7	Did not qualify			
2014	NCAA	2nd/10	18	13	5	.722	—	4	1	3	Lost Finals vs San Beda
2015	NCAA	5th/10	18	12	6	.667	1	1	0	1	Lost 4th seed playoff vs Mapua
2016	NCAA	2nd/10	18	14	4	.778	—	4	1	3	Lost Finals vs San Beda
2017	NCAA	6th/10	18	9	9	.500	9	1	0	1	Lost 4th seed playoff round 1 vs Letran
2018	NCAA	8th/10	18	5	13	.278	12	Did not qualify			
2019	NCAA	10th/10	18	4	14	.222	14	Did not qualify			
2020 (Note: Season cancelled due to the COVID-19 pandemic.)	NCAA	Season canceled									
2021 (Note: Season postponed to early 2022 due to the COVID-19 pandemic.)	NCAA	6th/10	9	4	5	.444	5	1	0	1	Lost qualifying playoff vs Perpetual
2022	NCAA	7th/10	18	7	11	.389	7	Did not qualify			
2023	NCAA	10th/10	18	2	16	.111	13	Did not qualify			
2024	NCAA	7th/10	18	7	11	.389	8	Did not qualify			
2025	NCAA	2nd/5	13	7	6	.538	2	2	0	2	Lost quarterfinals vs Letran
2026	NCAA	3rd/5	13	6	7	.462	3	1	0	1	Lost quartetfinals vs JRU
NCRAA totals							—				2 championships
NCAA totals			285	124	161	.435	—	13	2	11	2 playoffs appearances

== Honors ==
=== Team honors ===
- National Intercollegiate Championship
  - Champions (1): 1983
- National Capital Region Athletic Association
  - Champions (2): 2006, 2007

=== Player honors ===
- NCAA Rookie of the Year
  - Dioncee Holts: 2014
  - Justin Arana: 2019
  - Cade Flores: 2022
- NCAA Defensive Player of the Year
  - Justin Arana (2): 2019, 2021
  - Cade Flores (1): 2022
- NCAA Most Improved Player
  - Jio Jalalon (1): 2014
  - Archie Concepcion (1): 2018
  - Lorenz Capulong (1): 2022
  - Renzo Abiera (1): 2025
