= Gilbert Malabanan =

Filipino basketball head coach

Personal information
- Born: February 19, 1979 (age 47) San Pedro, Laguna, Philippines

Career information
- College: Perpetual
- PBA draft: 2002:
- Drafted by: Barangay Ginebra Kings
- Position: Head coach
- Coaching career: 2018–present

Career history

Playing
- 2002: Barangay Ginebra Kings
- 2002–2005: San Miguel Beermen

Coaching
- 2018: Lyceum (assistant)
- 2021–2025: Lyceum

Career highlights
- As head coach: 3× Final 4 semifinalist, 2022-2024

Gilbert Locarinas Malabanan (born February 19, 1979) is a Filipino former basketball player and current head coach of the Lyceum Pirates in the National Collegiate Athletic Association. He played for Ginebra and San Miguel in the Philippine Basketball Association in the early 2000s.

== Coaching career ==
A former deputy of Topex Robinson and Jeff Perlas, Malabanan took over the head coaching position of the Lyceum Pirates in December 2021 and never lost a final four berth for three straight years in the NCAA.

== Coaching record ==
=== Collegiate ===
Season	Team	GP	W	L	PCT	Finish	PG	PW	PL	PPCT	Results
2021	LPU	9	2	7	.222	9th	—	—	—	—	Did not qualify
2022	LPU	18	12	6	.667	3rd	1	0	1	.000	Lost in the semifinals
2023	LPU	18	13	5	.722	2nd	3	0	3	.000	Lost in the semifinals
2024	LPU	18	10	8	.556	4th	1	0	1	.000	Lost in the semifinals
2025	LPU	13	3	13	.231	4th/5	2	1	1	.000	Lost in the quarterfinals
Totals		63	37	26	.587		6	1	6	.000	0 championship

== Early years ==
Malabanan was a high-scorer for UPHSD Altas in the NCAA before he became a second-round pick in the 2002 PBA Draft for Ginebra and would later play for San Miguel.

During his amateur days, Malabanan also played for Chowking under coach Leo Austria in the defunct Philippine Basketball League and won the PBL crowns in the 2000–01 and 2001-02 seasons.

== Political career ==
Malabanan is running as city councilor of San Pedro, Laguna in the 2025 elections.
