= NCAA Season 92 basketball tournaments =

Basketball season

NCAA Season 92
- Host school: San Beda College
| Men's Finals | G1 | G2 | Wins |
|---|---|---|---|
| San Beda Red Lions | 88 | 83 | 2 |
| Arellano Chiefs | 85 | 73 | 0 |
- Duration: October 6–11, 2016
- Arena(s): Mall of Asia Arena
- Finals MVP: Arnaud Noah
- Winning coach: Jamike Jarin (1st title)
- Semifinalists: Mapúa Cardinals; Perpetual Altas
- TV network(s): ABS-CBN Sports and Action, The Filipino Channel, ABS-CBN Sports and Action HD
| Juniors' Finals | G1 | G2 | G3 | Wins |
|---|---|---|---|---|
| San Beda Red Cubs | 64 | 81 | 67 | 1 |
| Mapúa Red Robins | 83 | 78 | 84 | 2 |
- Duration: October 6–14, 2016
- Arena(s): Mall of Asia Arena; The Arena in San Juan
- Finals MVP: Bryan Samudio
- Winning coach: Randy Alcantara (1st title)
- Semifinalists: La Salle Green Hills Greenies; Arellano Braves

The 2016 basketball tournaments of the National Collegiate Athletic Association (Philippines), otherwise known as NCAA Season 92, officially opened on June 25, 2016 at the Mall of Asia Arena, Pasay. The showdown between season hosts San Beda Red Lions and season 91 men's basketball champions Letran Knights will be the first game, while JRU Heavy Bombers will face Mapua Cardinals in the second game.

== Tournament format ==
The NCAA used the NCAA Final Four format first adopted in 1997.

The games of the men's basketball will be played on Tuesdays, Thursdays and Fridays, while the junior games will be conducted every Mondays, Thursdays and Fridays. Most of the basketball games will be held at the Filoil Flying V Centre in San Juan, while Playoffs Final Four and Finals matches will be held at the MOA Arena.

Starting this season, NCAA players can choose their jersey number from #00 to #99. The new rule is in line with the current rules set by FIBA on basketball jerseys. Also, the league will implement harsher penalties against teams who will commit foul away from the ball in the last two minutes or the so-called Hack-a-Shaq fouls.

Veteran basketball analyst Andy Jao will serve as the commissioner of the men's basketball tournament. Jao will tap referees and game officials from the three basketball referees associations, which are all associated with the Samahang Basketball ng Pilipinas (SBP), to officiate this season's basketball games.

== Men's tournament ==
=== Teams ===
| Team | College | Coach |
|---|---|---|
| Arellano Chiefs | Arellano University (AU) | (Philippines) Jerry Codiñera |
| Letran Knights | Colegio de San Juan de Letran (CSJL) | (Philippines) Jeff Napa |
| Benilde Blazers | De La Salle–College of Saint Benilde (CSB) | (Philippines) Gabby Velasco |
| EAC Generals | Emilio Aguinaldo College (EAC) | (Philippines) Andy de Guzman |
| JRU Heavy Bombers | José Rizal University (JRU) | (Philippines) Vergel Meneses |
| Lyceum Pirates | Lyceum of the Philippines University (LPU) | (Philippines) Topex Robinson |
| Mapúa Cardinals | Mapúa Institute of Technology (MIT) | (Philippines) Atoy Co |
| San Beda Red Lions | San Beda College (SBC) | (Philippines) Jamike Jarin |
| San Sebastian Stags | San Sebastian College – Recoletos (SSC-R) | (Philippines) Edgar Macaraya |
| Perpetual Altas | University of Perpetual Help System DALTA (UPHSD) | (Philippines) Jimwell Gican |

==== Coaching changes ====
| Team | Old coach | Reason | New coach |
|---|---|---|---|
| Letran Knights | (Philippines) Aldin Ayo | Signed by De La Salle Green Archers | (Philippines) Jeff Napa |
| Perpetual Altas | (Philippines) Jimwell Gican | End of interim spell | (Philippines) Jimwell Gican |
| San Sebastian Stags | (Philippines) Rodney Santos | Fired | (Philippines) Edgar Macaraya |

=== Elimination round ===
==== Team standings ====
| Pos | Team | W | L | PCT | GB | Qualification |
|---|---|---|---|---|---|---|
| 1 | San Beda Red Lions (H) | 14 | 4 | .778 (Note: First-seed playoff: San Beda 80–73 Arellano) | — | Twice-to-beat in the semifinals |
| 2 | Arellano Chiefs | 14 | 4 | .778 | — | Twice-to-beat in the semifinals |
| 3 | Mapúa Cardinals | 12 | 6 | .667 | 2 | Twice-to-win in the semifinals |
| 4 | Perpetual Altas | 11 | 7 | .611 | 3 | Twice-to-win in the semifinals |
| 5 | JRU Heavy Bombers | 9 | 9 | .500 (Note: Head-to-head record: JRU 1–1 Letran (JRU +2)) | 5 | |
| 6 | Letran Knights | 9 | 9 | .500 | 5 | |
| 7 | San Sebastian Stags | 8 | 10 | .444 | 6 | |
| 8 | EAC Generals | 6 | 12 | .333 (Note: Head-to-head record: EAC 2–0 Lyceum) | 8 | |
| 9 | Lyceum Pirates | 6 | 12 | .333 | 8 | |
| 10 | Benilde Blazers | 1 | 17 | .056 | 13 | |

Source: ABS-CBN Sports
Rules for classification: 1) winning percentage; 2) if tied for top 4, one-game playoff; 3) head-to-head record; 4) overall point differential
(H) Hosts

==== Match-up results ====
| | Round 1 | | | | | | | | | Round 2 | | | | | | | | |
| Team ╲ Game | 1 | 2 | 3 | 4 | 5 | 6 | 7 | 8 | 9 | 10 | 11 | 12 | 13 | 14 | 15 | 16 | 17 | 18 |
|---|---|---|---|---|---|---|---|---|---|---|---|---|---|---|---|---|---|---|
| Arellano | UPHD school colors | SSC-R school colors | Letran school colors | Mapua school colors | San Beda school colors | EAC school colors | CSB school colors | Lyceum school colors | JRU school colors | SSC-R school colors | CSB school colors | EAC school colors | UPHD school colors | Lyceum school colors | Letran school colors | JRU school colors | Mapua school colors | San Beda school colors |
| Letran | San Beda school colors | EAC school colors | CSB school colors | Arellano school colors | SSC-R school colors | UPHD school colors | JRU school colors | Lyceum school colors | Mapua school colors | Lyceum school colors | JRU school colors | San Beda school colors | CSB school colors | SSC-R school colors | UPHD school colors | Arellano school colors | Mapua school colors | EAC school colors |
| Benilde | SSC-R school colors | Mapua school colors | Letran school colors | JRU school colors | San Beda school colors | Lyceum school colors | UPHD school colors | Arellano school colors | EAC school colors | San Beda school colors | Arellano school colors | UPHD school colors | Letran school colors | JRU school colors | SSC-R school colors | Mapua school colors | EAC school colors | Lyceum school colors |
| EAC | Lyceum school colors | Letran school colors | San Beda school colors | Mapua school colors | JRU school colors | Arellano school colors | SSC-R school colors | UPHD school colors | CSB school colors | UPHD school colors | San Beda school colors | Arellano school colors | JRU school colors | Lyceum school colors | Mapua school colors | SSC-R school colors | CSB school colors | Letran school colors |
| JRU | Mapua school colors | UPHD school colors | CSB school colors | Lyceum school colors | EAC school colors | Letran school colors | SSC-R school colors | Arellano school colors | San Beda school colors | Mapua school colors | Letran school colors | Lyceum school colors | EAC school colors | CSB school colors | San Beda school colors | UPHD school colors | Arellano school colors | SSC-R school colors |
| Lyceum | EAC school colors | San Beda school colors | Mapua school colors | JRU school colors | CSB school colors | SSC-R school colors | UPHD school colors | Arellano school colors | Letran school colors | Letran school colors | Mapua school colors | JRU school colors | SSC-R school colors | EAC school colors | Arellano school colors | San Beda school colors | UPHD school colors | CSB school colors |
| Mapúa | JRU school colors | CSB school colors | Lyceum school colors | EAC school colors | Arellano school colors | SSC-R school colors | San Beda school colors | UPHD school colors | Letran school colors | JRU school colors | Lyceum school colors | SSC-R school colors | San Beda school colors | EAC school colors | Letran school colors | CSB school colors | Arellano school colors | UPHD school colors |
| San Beda | Letran school colors | Lyceum school colors | EAC school colors | CSB school colors | UPHD school colors | Arellano school colors | Mapua school colors | SSC-R school colors | JRU school colors | CSB school colors | EAC school colors | SSC-R school colors | Letran school colors | Mapua school colors | JRU school colors | Lyceum school colors | UPHD school colors | Arellano school colors |
| San Sebastian | CSB school colors | Arellano school colors | UPHD school colors | Letran school colors | Mapua school colors | Lyceum school colors | EAC school colors | JRU school colors | San Beda school colors | Arellano school colors | UPHD school colors | San Beda school colors | Mapua school colors | Lyceum school colors | Letran school colors | CSB school colors | EAC school colors | JRU school colors |
| Perpetual | Arellano school colors | JRU school colors | SSC-R school colors | San Beda school colors | Letran school colors | CSB school colors | Lyceum school colors | EAC school colors | Mapua school colors | EAC school colors | SSC-R school colors | CSB school colors | Arellano school colors | Letran school colors | JRU school colors | Lyceum school colors | San Beda school colors | Mapua school colors |

= Win; = OT win; = Loss; = OT loss

==== Scores ====
| Team | AU | CSJL | CSB | EAC | JRU | LPU | MIT | SBC | SSC-R | UPHSD |
|---|---|---|---|---|---|---|---|---|---|---|
| Arellano Chiefs | | 79–89 | 70–59 | 88–82 | 89–69 | 81–76 | 96–75 | 86–101 | 99–81 | 83–78 |
| Letran Knights | 74–83 | | 56–52 | 76–72 | 67–62 | 72–75 | 75–79 | 85–89 | 90–77 | 55–61 |
| Benilde Blazers | 69–78 | 40–57 | | 56–76 | 56–86 | 58–75 | 68–78 | 63–90 | 49–54 | 55–70 |
| EAC Generals | 74–83 | 87–93* | 65–62 | | 59–60 | 64–57 | 67–70 | 76–91 | 73–67 | 53–70 |
| JRU Heavy Bombers | 68–79 | 75–68* | 71–63 | 60–63 | | 66–69 | 71–74 | 79–73 | 68–62 | 50–58 |
| Lyceum Pirates | 75–78 | 68–66 | 61–65 | 66–73 | 58–68 | | 64–75 | 86–91 | 83–79 | 68–71 |
| Mapúa Cardinals | 82–95 | 77–72 | 69–59 | 82–72 | 60–65 | 90–75 | | 74–85 | 88–75 | 51–71 |
| San Beda Red Lions | 91–81 | 83–71 | 82–64 | 90–82 | 88–97 | 89–73 | 97–101* | | 87–77 | 88–70 |
| San Sebastian Stags | 84–89 | 61–73 | 66–57 | 87–69 | 85–58 | 77–69 | 69–67 | 72–71 | | 61–76 |
| Perpetual Altas | 76–62 | 63–69 | 70–45 | 71–59 | 89–80** | 61–64 | 63–67 | 75–84 | 55–71 | |

Legend: Blue = left column team win; Red = top row team win.
Matches with lighter background shading were decided after overtime.

=== First seed playoff ===
Winner will face Perpetual Help, while loser will face Mapua, in the semifinals. Either way, both teams had twice-to-beat advantage in the semifinals.

ABS-CBN S+A

September 27
3:45 p.m.

| San Beda Red Lions | 80–73 | Arellano Chiefs |
Scoring by quarter: 23–22, 15–13, 22–24, 20–14
| Pts: Amiel Soberano 26; Rebs: Robert Bolick 7 Asts: Roldan Sara 5 | | Pts: Jio Jalalon 14; Rebs: Dioncee Holts 12; Asts: Jio Jalalon 5 |

Filoil Flying V Center, San Juan

=== Bracket ===
Semifinals (Top 2 twice-to-beat)
1 | San Beda | 83 | 78
4 | Perpetual | 87 | 63
2 | Arellano | 92
3 | Mapúa | 80

Finals (Best-of-three playoff)
1 | San Beda | 88 | 83
2 | Arellano | 85 | 73

=== Semifinals ===
San Beda and Arellano have the twice-to-beat advantage; they only need to win once, while their opponents twice, to advance to the Finals.

==== (1) San Beda vs. (4) Perpetual ====
ABS-CBN S+A

September 30
1:45 pm

| San Beda Red Lions | 83–87 | Perpetual Altas |
Scoring by quarter: 9–21, 27–20, 26–19, 21–27
| Pts: Robert Bolick 21; Rebs: Javee Mocon 7 Asts: Robert Bolick 6 | | Pts: Gab Dangangon 27; Rebs: Bright Akhuetie 11; Asts: Jeffrey Coronel 8 |

Mall of Asia Arena Pasay

ABS-CBN S+A

October 4
3:45 pm

| San Beda Red Lions | 78–63 | Perpetual Altas |
Scoring by quarter: 15–20, 22–10, 19–14, 22–19
| Pts: Davon Potts 16; Rebs: Javee Mocon 15; Asts: Roldan Sara 4 | | Pts: Gab Dagangon 16; Rebs: Dagangon, Akhuetie, 10 each Asts: Keith Pido 5 |
San Beda wins series in two games

Mall of Asia Arena, Pasay

==== (2) Arellano vs. (3) Mapua ====
ABS-CBN S+A

September 30
3:45 pm

| Arellano Chiefs | 92–80 | Mapúa Cardinals |
Scoring by quarter: 27–18, 22–24, 20–15, 23–23
| Pts: Jalalon, Flores, 22 each Rebs: Holts, Flores, 10 each Asts: Jio Jalalon 9 | | Pts: Allwell Oraeme 20; Rebs: Allwell Oraeme 24; Asts: Andrew Estrella 6 |
Arellano wins series in one game

Mall of Asia Arena Pasay

=== Finals ===
This is a best-of-three playoff.

ABS-CBN S+A

October 6
3:45 pm

| San Beda Red Lions | 88–85 | Arellano Chiefs |
Scoring by quarter: 28–20, 26–29, 16–20, 18–15
| Pts: Robert Bolick 24; Rebs: Roldan Sara 13; Asts: Roldan Sara 11 | | Pts: Jio Jalalon 21; Rebs: Dioncee Holts 14; Asts: Kent Salado 6 |

Mall of Asia Arena, Pasay

ABS-CBN S+A

October 11
3:45 pm

| San Beda Red Lions | 83–73 | Arellano Chiefs |
Scoring by quarter: 18–25, 27–15, 18–20, 20–13
| Pts: Arnaud Noah 18; Rebs: Arnaud Noah 11; Asts: Roldan Sara 6 | | Pts: Jio Jalalon 19; Rebs: Lervin Flores 10; Asts: Jio Jalalon 10 |
San Beda wins series, 2–0

Mall of Asia Arena, Pasay

- Finals Most Valuable Player: Arnaud Noah (San Beda Red Lions)

=== All-Star Game ===
The All-Star festivities of the NCAA Season 92 was held at the Filoil Flying V Centre on August 12, 2016, which served as a transition event for the first and second rounds of elimination of the basketball tournament. This also marked the introduction of two new side events, Skills Challenge and Shooting Stars, aside from the three-point shootout and slam dunk competitions.

In the All-Star Game, the 10 member schools were divided into East and West. The West squad is represented by players from San Beda College, University of Perpetual Help, Arellano University, Jose Rizal University and San Sebastian College-Recoletos, while the East team draws from Lyceum of the Philippines University, Emilio Aguinaldo College, College of Saint Benilde, Mapua Institute of Technology, and Colegio de San Juan de Letran.

ABS-CBN S+A

August 12

| West All-Stars | 111–77 | East All-Stars |
Scoring by quarter: 35–17, 17–21, 29–17, 30–22
| Pts: Bright Akhuetie 15; Rebs: Donald Tankoua 11; Asts: Jio Jalalon 6 | | Pts: Jorem Morada 13; Rebs: Christian Fajarito 7 Asts: Jorem Morada, Darell Menina 3 |

Filoil Flying V Centre, San Juan

- All-Star Game MVP: Bright Akhuetie (UPHSD)

==== Side events winners ====
- Skills Challenge Champion: Shane Menina (Mapúa)
- Shooting Stars Champion: Darius Estrella, Cadell Buño, and Marvin Hayes (JRU)
- 3-Point Shootout Champion: AC Soberano (San Beda)
- Slam Dunk Champion: Yankie Haruna (Benilde)

=== Awards ===
NCAA Season 92 men's basketball champions
San Beda Red Lions
20th title

- Most Valuable Player: Allwell Oraeme (Mapúa Cardinals)
- Rookie of the Year: Mike Harry Nzeusseu (Lyceum Pirates)
- Defensive Player of the Year: Allwell Oraeme (Mapúa Cardinals)
- Most Improved Player: Donald Tankoua (San Beda Red Lions)
- Mythical Five:
  - Jio Jalalon (Arellano Chiefs)
  - Laminou Hamadou (EAC Generals)
  - Allwell Oraeme (Mapúa Cardinals)
  - Donald Tankoua (San Beda Red Lions)
  - Bright Akhuetie (Perpetual Altas)

==== Players of the Week ====
| Week | Player | Team | Ref. |
|---|---|---|---|
| Week 1^{July 3–9} | (Philippines) Jio Jalalon | Arellano Chiefs | |
| Week 2^{July 10–16} | (Cameroon) Donald Tankoua | San Beda Red Lions | |
| Week 3^{July 17–23} | (Philippines) Adrian Ablan | Lyceum Pirates | |
| Week 4^{July 24–30} | (Nigeria) Bright Akhuetie | Perpetual Altas | |
| Week 5^{August 7 to 13} | (Philippines) Paolo Pontejos | JRU Heavy Bombers | |
| Week 6^{August 14 to 20} | (Philippines) Jio Jalalon | Arellano Chiefs | |
| Week 7^{August 21 to 27} | (Philippines) Teytey Teodoro | JRU Heavy Bombers | |
| Week 8^{August 28 to September 3} | (Philippines) Gab Dagangon | Perpetual Altas | |
| Week 9^{September 4 to 10} | (Philippines) Jio Jalalon | Arellano Chiefs | |
| Week 10^{September 11 to 17} | (Nigeria) Allwell Oraeme | Mapúa Cardinals | |
| Week 11^{September 18 to 24} | (Philippines) Javee Mocon | San Beda Red Lions | |

== Juniors' tournament ==
=== Elimination round ===
==== Team standings ====
| Pos | Team | W | L | PCT | GB | Qualification |
|---|---|---|---|---|---|---|
| 1 | San Beda Red Cubs (H) | 17 | 1 | .944 | — | Twice-to-beat in the semifinals |
| 2 | Mapúa Red Robins | 15 | 3 | .833 | 2 | Twice-to-beat in the semifinals |
| 3 | La Salle Green Hills Greenies | 13 | 5 | .722 (Note: Third-seed playoff: LSGH 79–76 Arellano) | 4 | Twice-to-win in the semifinals |
| 4 | Arellano Braves | 13 | 5 | .722 | 4 | Twice-to-win in the semifinals |
| 5 | Lyceum Junior Pirates | 9 | 9 | .500 | 8 | |
| 6 | Letran Squires | 7 | 11 | .389 | 10 | |
| 7 | Perpetual Junior Altas | 5 | 13 | .278 (Note: Head-to-head record: Perpetual 2–0 JRU) | 12 | |
| 8 | JRU Light Bombers | 5 | 13 | .278 | 12 | |
| 9 | EAC–ICA Brigadiers | 4 | 14 | .222 | 13 | |
| 10 | San Sebastian Staglets | 2 | 16 | .111 | 15 | |

Source: ABS-CBN Sports
Rules for classification: 1) winning percentage; 2) if tied for top 4, one-game playoff; 3) head-to-head record; 4) overall point differential
(H) Hosts

==== Match-up results ====
| | Round 1 | | | | | | | | | Round 2 | | | | | | | | |
| Team ╲ Game | 1 | 2 | 3 | 4 | 5 | 6 | 7 | 8 | 9 | 10 | 11 | 12 | 13 | 14 | 15 | 16 | 17 | 18 |
|---|---|---|---|---|---|---|---|---|---|---|---|---|---|---|---|---|---|---|
| AU | UPHD school colors | SSC-R school colors | JRU school colors | EAC school colors | Letran school colors | Mapua school colors | Lyceum school colors | San Beda school colors | CSB school colors | EAC school colors | SSC-R school colors | JRU school colors | Letran school colors | UPHD school colors | Lyceum school colors | CSB school colors | Mapua school colors | San Beda school colors |
| CSJL | San Beda school colors | EAC school colors | CSB school colors | Lyceum school colors | Arellano school colors | SSC-R school colors | UPHD school colors | JRU school colors | Mapua school colors | Lyceum school colors | UPHD school colors | CSB school colors | Arellano school colors | EAC school colors | San Beda school colors | Mapua school colors | SSC-R school colors | JRU school colors |
| EAC–ICA | Lyceum school colors | Letran school colors | San Beda school colors | Arellano school colors | UPHD school colors | JRU school colors | Mapua school colors | SSC-R school colors | CSB school colors | Arellano school colors | CSB school colors | JRU school colors | Lyceum school colors | Letran school colors | San Beda school colors | UPHD school colors | SSC-R school colors | Mapua school colors |
| JRU | Mapua school colors | UPHD school colors | Arellano school colors | SSC-R school colors | Lyceum school colors | EAC school colors | CSB school colors | Letran school colors | San Beda school colors | Mapua school colors | San Beda school colors | Arellano school colors | EAC school colors | CSB school colors | UPHD school colors | Lyceum school colors | Letran school colors | SSC-R school colors |
| LSGH | SSC-R school colors | Mapua school colors | UPHD school colors | Letran school colors | San Beda school colors | Lyceum school colors | JRU school colors | EAC school colors | Arellano school colors | UPHD school colors | EAC school colors | Letran school colors | SSC-R school colors | JRU school colors | Lyceum school colors | Arellano school colors | San Beda school colors | Mapua school colors |
| LPU–C | EAC school colors | San Beda school colors | Letran school colors | Mapua school colors | JRU school colors | CSB school colors | Arellano school colors | UPHD school colors | SSC-R school colors | Letran school colors | San Beda school colors | Mapua school colors | EAC school colors | Arellano school colors | CSB school colors | SSC-R school colors | JRU school colors | UPHD school colors |
| MHSS | JRU school colors | CSB school colors | SSC-R school colors | Lyceum school colors | Arellano school colors | EAC school colors | San Beda school colors | UPHD school colors | Letran school colors | JRU school colors | SSC-R school colors | UPHD school colors | Lyceum school colors | San Beda school colors | Letran school colors | Arellano school colors | CSB school colors | EAC school colors |
| SBC–R | Letran school colors | Lyceum school colors | EAC school colors | UPHD school colors | CSB school colors | SSC-R school colors | Mapua school colors | Arellano school colors | JRU school colors | SSC-R school colors | JRU school colors | Lyceum school colors | UPHD school colors | Mapua school colors | Letran school colors | EAC school colors | CSB school colors | Arellano school colors |
| SSC–R | CSB school colors | Arellano school colors | Mapua school colors | JRU school colors | UPHD school colors | Letran school colors | San Beda school colors | EAC school colors | Lyceum school colors | San Beda school colors | Arellano school colors | Mapua school colors | CSB school colors | UPHD school colors | Lyceum school colors | Letran school colors | EAC school colors | JRU school colors |
| UPHSD | Arellano school colors | JRU school colors | CSB school colors | San Beda school colors | SSC-R school colors | EAC school colors | Letran school colors | Lyceum school colors | Mapua school colors | CSB school colors | Letran school colors | Mapua school colors | San Beda school colors | Arellano school colors | SSC-R school colors | JRU school colors | EAC school colors | Lyceum school colors |

= Win; = OT win; = Loss; = OT loss

==== Scores ====
| Team | AU | CSJL | EAC-ICA | JRU | LSGH | LPU-C | MHSS | SBC-R | SSC-R | UPHSD |
|---|---|---|---|---|---|---|---|---|---|---|
| Arellano Braves | | 87–75 | 98–89 | 95–74 | 69–98 | 91–77 | 83–74 | 93–90 | 86–66 | 105–88 |
| Letran Squires | 77–107 | | 74–67 | 74–63 | 56–69 | 63–56 | 74–95 | 74–107 | 80–73 | 68–88 |
| EAC–ICA Brigadiers | 64–90 | 64–69 | | 67–85 | 74–87 | 66–85 | 74–98 | 60–107 | 71–87 | 70–87 |
| JRU Light Bombers | 80–85 | 64–51 | 58–65 | | 63–70 | 74–92 | 64–86 | 69–79 | 68–60 | 52–66 |
| La Salle Green Hills Greenies | 77–70 | 71–69 | 70–65 | 72–51 | | 77–82 | 78–94 | 72–97 | 70–65 | 92–81 |
| LPU Cavite Junior Pirates | 77–66 | 105–91 | 76–78 | 75–72 | 72–85 | | 86–89 | 88–97 | 84–65 | 117–93 |
| Malayan Red Robins | 84–71 | 86–77 | 112–75 | 81–79 | 75–59 | 77–74 | | 84–86 | 101–45 | 100–76 |
| San Beda Red Lions | 92–74 | 96–83 | 86–79 | 86–61 | 85–82 | 80–66 | 89–84 | | 74–66 | 95–63 |
| San Sebastian Staglets | 65–78 | 71–75 | 74–81 | 60–63 | 51–61 | 74–86 | 66–91 | 55–111 | | 45–57 |
| Perpetual Junior Altas | 76–92 | 70–78 | 65–79 | 76–72 | 80–95 | 72–76 | 82–92 | 81–93 | 68–72 | |

Legend: Blue = left column team win; Red = top row team win.
Matches with lighter background shading were decided after overtime.

=== Third seed playoff ===
September 27
1:45 pm

| La Salle Green Hills Greenies | 79–76 | Arellano Braves |
Scoring by quarter: 18–21, 14–14, 25–21, 22–20
| Pts: Unique Naboa 21; Rebs: Troy Mallinllin 11; Asts: Unique Naboa 8 | | Pts: Guilmer Dela Torre 20; Rebs: Lars Sunga 14; Asts: Guilmer Dela Torre, Jayson Danas 2 |

Filoil Flying V Center, San Juan

=== Bracket ===
Semifinals (Top 2 twice-to-beat)
1 | San Beda–Rizal | 84 | 102
4 | Arellano | 87 | 93
2 | Malayan | 88
3 | LSGH | 81

Finals (Best-of-three playoff)
1 | San Beda–Rizal | 64 | 81 | 67
2 | Malayan | 83 | 78 | 84

=== Semifinals ===
San Beda and Malayan have the twice-to-beat advantage; they only need to win once, while their opponents twice, to advance to the Finals.

==== (1) San Beda vs. (4) Arellano ====
September 30
10:00 am

| San Beda Red Cubs | 84–87 | Arellano Braves |
Scoring by quarter: 25–18, 24–19, 15–23, 20–29
| Pts: 3 players 15; Rebs: Sam Abu Hilje 25; Asts: Joshua Tagala 3 | | Pts: Lars Sunga 16; Rebs: Carlo Abadeza 11; Asts: Carlo Abadeza 4 |

Mall of Asia Arena

October 4
1:00 pm

| San Beda Red Cubs | 102–93 | Arellano Braves |
Scoring by quarter: 28–17, 33–20, 22–30, 18–27
| Pts: Robi Nayve 17; Rebs: Sam Abu Hilje 10; Asts: Joshua Tagala 5 | | Pts: Carlo Abadeza 19; Rebs: Carlo Abadeza, Aaron Fermin 9 Asts: Jayson Danas 5 |
San Beda wins series in two games

Mall of Asia Arena

==== (2) Malayan vs. (3) LSGH ====
September 30
11:45 am

| Mapúa Red Robins | 88–81 | La Salle Green Hills Greenies |
Scoring by quarter: 21–23, 17–14, 25–26, 25–18
| Pts: Will Gozum 16; Rebs: Bryan Samudio 17; Asts: Michael Enriquez 6 | | Pts: Unique Naboa 17; Rebs: Troy Mallinllin 22; Asts: JD Cagulangan 6 |
Malayan wins series in one game

Mall of Asia Arena

=== Finals ===
This is a best-of-three playoff.

October 6
1:00 pm

| San Beda Red Cubs | 64–83 | Mapúa Red Robins |
Scoring by quarter: 11–12, 22–19, 22–30, 9–22
| Pts: Joshua Tagala 11; Rebs: 3 players 8 Asts: Evan Nelle 6 | | Pts: Jasper Salenga 17; Rebs: Bryan Samudio 12; Asts: Romuel Junsay 5 |

Mall of Asia Arena

October 11
1:00pm

| San Beda Red Cubs | 81–78 | Mapúa Red Robins |
Scoring by quarter: 16–18, 17–23, 32–21, 16–16
| Pts: Romuel Junsay 23; Rebs: Warren Bonifacio 14; Asts: 5 players 3 | | Pts: Carlo Obenza 19; Rebs: Prince Etrate, Sam Abu Hilje 8 Asts: Evan Nelle 7 |

Mall of Asia Arena

October 13
2:00pm

| San Beda Red Cubs | 67–84 | Mapúa Red Robins |
Scoring by quarter: 13–24, 11–14, 16–14, 27–32
| Pts: Carlo Obenza, Ed Velasquez 14; Rebs: Sam Abu Hilje 11; Asts: Robi Nayve, Joshua Tagala 3 | | Pts: Brian Lacap 16; Rebs: Warren Bonifacio 15; Asts: Clint Escamis 4 |
Malayan wins series, 2-1

Mall of Asia Arena

- Finals Most Valuable Player: Bryan Samudio (Mapúa Red Robins)

=== Awards ===
NCAA Season 92 juniors' basketball champions
Mapúa Red Robins
First title
(Mapúa High School has phased out in 2000.)

- Most Valuable Player: John Troy Mallinllin (La Salle Green Hills Greenies)
- Rookie of the Year: Aaron Fermin (Arellano Braves)
- Defensive Player of the Year: Aaron Fermin (Arellano Braves)
- Most Improved Player: Joshua Gavril Tagala (San Beda Red Cubs)
- Mythical Five:
  - Guilmer Dela Torre (Arellano Braves)
  - Aaron Fermin (Arellano Braves)
  - John Troy Mallinllin (La Salle Green Hills Greenies)
  - Samuel Abu Hijle (San Beda Red Cubs)
  - Joshua Gavril Tagala (San Beda Red Cubs)

==== Players of the Week ====
| Week | Player | Team | Ref. |
|---|---|---|---|
| Week 1^{July 10–16} | (Philippines) Guilmer dela Torre | Arellano Braves | |
| Week 2^{July 17–23} | (Philippines) Guilmer dela Torre | Arellano Braves | |
| Week 3^{July 24–30} | (Philippines) Samuel Abu Hijle | San Beda Red Cubs | |
| Week 4^{July 31-August 6} | (Philippines) Guilmer dela Torre | Arellano Braves | |
| Week 5^{August 14–20} | (Philippines) Troy Mallillin | La Salle Green Hills Greenies | |
| Week 6^{August 21–27} | (Philippines) Samuel Abu Hijle | San Beda Red Cubs | |
| Week 7^{August 28-September 3} | (Philippines) Guilmer dela Torre | Arellano Braves | |
| Week 8^{September 4–10} | (Philippines) Troy Mallillin | La Salle Green Hills Greenies | |
| Week 9^{September 11–17} | (Philippines) Evan Nelle | San Beda Red Cubs | |
| Week 10^{September 18–24} | (Philippines) Evan Nelle | San Beda Red Cubs | |

== See also ==
- UAAP Season 79 basketball tournaments

| Preceded by Season 91 (2015) | NCAA basketball seasons Season 92 (2016) | Succeeded by Season 93 (2017) |
