= List of NCAA Final Four results (Philippines) =

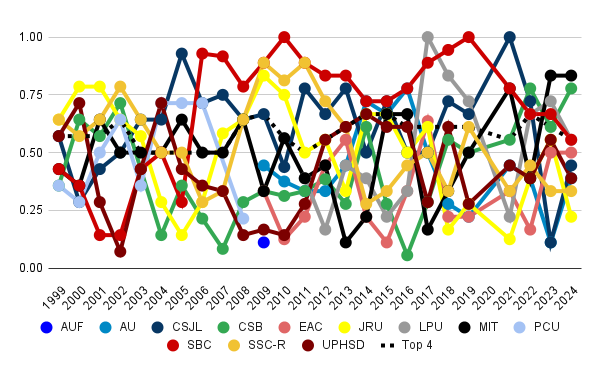
Final team standings for men's basketball since 1999

This is a list of the National Collegiate Athletic Association (NCAA) men's basketball final four results. The list includes NCAA men's basketball games played under the final four format since the 1997 season, the year the format was instituted.

The results include one-game playoffs where teams tied after the elimination round for a final four berth played an extra game to determine which team clinches the higher seed in the playoffs.

Since the NCAA is not a home-and-away league, the position of season host rotates among member universities, and the host pays for the arena rental and other facilities. Since the 2004 season, most final four games are held at the Araneta Coliseum in Quezon City, the Philippines largest indoor arena, unless the Big Dome is unavailable.

The league uses a modified Shaughnessy playoff system: the top four teams enter the playoffs, while the top two seeds are given the "twice-to-beat" advantage, that is, in order for them to be eliminated in the semifinals, they have to be beaten twice by the No. 3 and No. 4 seed, with them needing to win only once in order to advance. The winners in the semifinals dispute the championship trophy in a best-of-three series.

In its institution in 1997, if a team wins all of its elimination round games (the "sweep"), the sweeping team advances outright to the finals possessing the twice-to-beat advantage, while the No. 3 and No. 4 seeds figure in a playoff to face the No. 2 seed. In 1997, the San Sebastian Stags swept the elimination round, earning a finals berth and a twice-to-beat advantage. After the San Sebastian juniors team swept the elimination round in 2008, the twice-to-beat incentive was dropped and the finals was turned into a best-of-three series. When the San Beda seniors team swept the elimination round in 2010, the No. 1 seed has a thrice to beat advantage in the finals, while the opponent has to be beaten twice to be defeated.

A third place playoff, a one-game playoff between losing semifinalists, was added in 2023.

== Results ==
For the semifinal columns, the No. 1 vs. No. 4 matchup is given first.

Legend

Arellano	Arellano University
Letran	Colegio de San Juan de Letran
Benilde	De La Salle–College of Saint Benilde
EAC	Emilio Aguinaldo College
JRU	José Rizal University
Lyceum	Lyceum of the Philippines University

Mapúa	Mapúa University
PCU	Philippine Christian University
San Beda	San Beda University
San Sebastian	San Sebastian College–Recoletos
Perpetual	University of Perpetual Help System DALTA
(OT)	Game went into overtime.

Year	Finals/third-place playoff			Semifinals			One-game playoff			
Year	Higher seed	Scores	Lower seed	Higher seed	Score/s	Lower seed	Winner	Score	Loser	Seed
1997	San Sebastian	84–72	San Beda	San Beda	72–65	Letran	None			
1997	San Sebastian	84–72	San Beda	Letran	68–57	Mapúa	None			
1998	Letran	81–74 (OT)	San Sebastian	Letran	def.	San Beda	None			
1998	Letran	81–74 (OT)	San Sebastian	San Sebastian	def.	Perpetual	None			
1999	JRC	74–75; 0–20 (Note: Game 2 of the 1999 finals was abandoned after a fracas where Letran point guard John Prior elbowed JRC's John Dale Valeña, with Letran leading 83–60. This caused the gallery to pelt debris to the court which caused the NCAA Commissioner to order JRC to concede the game.)	Letran	San Sebastian	63–65 def. by	Letran	None			
1999	JRC	74–75; 0–20	Letran	JRC	84–63	Perpetual	None			
2000 (details)	Benilde	66–64; 74–61	San Sebastian	JRC	53–60; 79–97	San Sebastian	None			
2000 (details)	Benilde	66–64; 74–61	San Sebastian	Perpetual	70–73; 73–86	Benilde	None			
2001 (details)	JRU	74–77; 95–81; 62–95	San Sebastian	JRU	94–98; 99–76	Benilde	None			
2001 (details)	JRU	74–77; 95–81; 62–95	San Sebastian	San Sebastian	58–65; 48–44	Mapúa	None			
2002 (details)	San Sebastian	79–78; 86–69	Benilde	San Sebastian	102–96 (OT)	JRU	None			
2002 (details)	San Sebastian	79–78; 86–69	Benilde	Benilde	93–95 (OT); 106–87	PCU	None			
2003 (details)	Letran	89–73; 77–85; 64–59	San Sebastian	Letran	72–66	Mapúa	None			
2003 (details)	Letran	89–73; 77–85; 64–59	San Sebastian	San Sebastian	81–73	JRU	None			
2004 (details)	Perpetual	68–70; 60–72	PCU	Perpetual	48–57; 58–56	San Beda	San Beda	59–52	Mapúa	4th
2004 (details)	Perpetual	68–70; 60–72	PCU	PCU	64–65; 85–80 (OT)	Letran	San Beda	59–52	Mapúa	4th
2005 (details)	Letran	74–79; 78–60; 62–54	PCU	Letran	93–60	San Sebastian	None			
2005 (details)	Letran	74–79; 78–60; 62–54	PCU	PCU	76–53	Mapúa	None			
2006 (details)	San Beda	71–57; 50–72; 68–67	PCU	San Beda	55–51	Mapúa	PCU	67–62	Letran	2nd
2006 (details)	San Beda	71–57; 50–72; 68–67	PCU	PCU	72–50	Letran	PCU	67–62	Letran	2nd
2007 (details)	San Beda	76–68; 76–64	Letran	San Beda	74–64	Mapúa	None			
2007 (details)	San Beda	76–68; 76–64	Letran	Letran	70–61	JRU	None			
2008 (details)	San Beda	72–68; 60–62; 85–69	JRU	San Beda	51–53; 60–53	Mapúa	JRU	57–53	San Sebastian	2nd/4th (Note: With four teams tied for second place in 2008, a mini-tournament was held to determine the 2nd–4th seeds in which the team with the best head-to-head record among the four (SSC-R) meets the team with the worst head-to-head record (JRU), with the other two (Letran and Mapúa) meeting each other in classification games. The winners of both games faced each other for the No. 2 seed while the losers faced for the No. 4 seed.)
2008 (details)	San Beda	72–68; 60–62; 85–69	JRU	San Beda	51–53; 60–53	Mapúa	Letran	62–52	Mapúa	2nd/4th
2008 (details)	San Beda	72–68; 60–62; 85–69	JRU	JRU	63–61	Letran	JRU	69–53	Letran	2nd
2008 (details)	San Beda	72–68; 60–62; 85–69	JRU	JRU	63–61	Letran	Mapúa	63–54	San Sebastian	4th
2009 (details)	San Beda	68–72 (2OT); 61–76	San Sebastian	San Beda	82–76	Letran	San Beda	71–65	San Sebastian	1st
2009 (details)	San Beda	68–72 (2OT); 61–76	San Sebastian	San Sebastian	65–72; 79–64	JRU	San Beda	71–65	San Sebastian	1st
2010 (details)	San Beda	93–73; 85–70	San Sebastian	San Sebastian	61–52	JRU	None			
2010 (details)	San Beda	93–73; 85–70	San Sebastian	JRU	60–54	Mapúa	None			
2011 (details)	San Beda	75–63; 57–55	San Sebastian	San Beda	83–74	JRU	San Beda	88–85	San Sebastian	1st
2011 (details)	San Beda	75–63; 57–55	San Sebastian	San Sebastian	62–70; 63–56	Letran	San Beda	88–85	San Sebastian	1st
2012 (details)	San Beda	62–60; 55–64; 67–39	Letran	San Beda	56–52	Perpetual	Perpetual	73–68	JRU	4th
2012 (details)	San Beda	62–60; 55–64; 67–39	Letran	San Sebastian	74–92; 70–73	Letran	Perpetual	73–68	JRU	4th
2013 (details)	San Beda	80–68; 74–79; 60–56	Letran	San Beda	70–51	Perpetual	San Sebastian	81–71	Perpetual	3rd
2013 (details)	San Beda	80–68; 74–79; 60–56	Letran	Letran	85–58	San Sebastian	San Sebastian	81–71	Perpetual	3rd
2014 (details)	San Beda	74–65; 89–70	Arellano	San Beda	81–75	Perpetual	San Beda	97–69	Arellano	1st
2014 (details)	San Beda	74–65; 89–70	Arellano	Arellano	72–65	JRU	San Beda	97–69	Arellano	1st
2015 (details)	San Beda	90–94; 68–61; 82–85 (OT)	Letran	San Beda	78–68	JRU	San Beda	83–78	Letran	1st
2015 (details)	San Beda	90–94; 68–61; 82–85 (OT)	Letran	Letran	91–90	Mapúa	Mapúa	81–76	JRU	3rd
2016 (details)	San Beda	88–85; 83–73	Arellano	San Beda	83–87; 78–63	Perpetual	San Beda	80–73	Arellano	1st
2016 (details)	San Beda	88–85; 83–73	Arellano	Arellano	92–80	Mapúa	San Beda	80–73	Arellano	1st
2017 (details)	Lyceum	87–94; 82–92	San Beda	San Beda	76–71	San Sebastian	San Sebastian	74–69	Letran	4th (Note: With three teams tied for fourth place in 2017, two tie-breaker games were held to determine who the 4th seed shall be. SSC-R, who has the best head-to-head record among the three, gets a bye, with the other two teams (Letran and Arellano) playing the first tie-breaker game. The winner of the Letran-Arellano game meets SSC-R in the second tie-breaker game.)
2017 (details)	Lyceum	87–94; 82–92	San Beda	JRU	73–85	San Sebastian	Letran	70–68	Arellano	4th
2018 (details)	San Beda	73–60; 71–56	Lyceum	San Beda	83–72	Perpetual	None			
2018 (details)	San Beda	73–60; 71–56	Lyceum	Lyceum	109–85	Letran	None			
2019 (details)	San Beda	64–65; 79–76; 79–81	Letran	Lyceum	88–92	Letran	None			
2019 (details)	San Beda	64–65; 79–76; 79–81	Letran	Letran	85–80	San Sebastian	None			
2020 (Note: 2020–21 season had a basketball tournament, but it was basically a skills showdown, due to the restrictions of the COVID-19 pandemic in the Philippines.)	Not held – Canceled due to the COVID-19 pandemic in Metro Manila						None			
2021 (Note: 2021–22 season was played in early 2022.) (details)	Letran	68–63; 75–65	Mapúa	Letran	77–75	Perpetual	San Beda	63–57	Benilde	Play-in (Note: The teams that finished 3rd and 4th after the elimination round; the winner is the #3 seed and advances to the semifinals against the #2 seed, while the loser is relegated to the fourth seed playoff. The teams that finished 5th and 6th after the elimination round; the winner advances to the fourth seed playoff, while the loser is eliminated. The winner is the #4 seed and advances to the semifinals against the #1 seed.)
2021 (details)	Letran	68–63; 75–65	Mapúa	Letran	77–75	Perpetual	Perpetual	59–52	Arellano	Play-in
2021 (details)	Letran	68–63; 75–65	Mapúa	Mapúa	67–73 (OT); 70–67	San Beda	Perpetual	76–64	Benilde	Play-in
2022 (details)	Benilde	75–81; 76–71; 67–81	Letran	Benilde	62–61	San Beda	None			
2022 (details)	Benilde	75–81; 76–71; 67–81	Letran	Letran	67–58	Lyceum	None			
2023 (details)	Mapúa	68–63; 65–71; 66–76	San Beda	Mapúa	78–67	Benilde	None			
2023 (details)	Lyceum	83–93	Benilde	Lyceum	68–89; 72–82	San Beda	None			
2024 (details)	Mapúa	84–73; 94–82	Benilde	Mapúa	89–79	Lyceum	None			
2024 (details)	Mapúa	84–73; 94–82	Benilde	Benilde	79–63	San Beda	None			
2025 (details)	Did not use the Final Four format									

== See also ==
- UAAP Final Four
- List of UAAP Final Four results
