= NCAA Final Four (Philippines) =

College basketball tournament

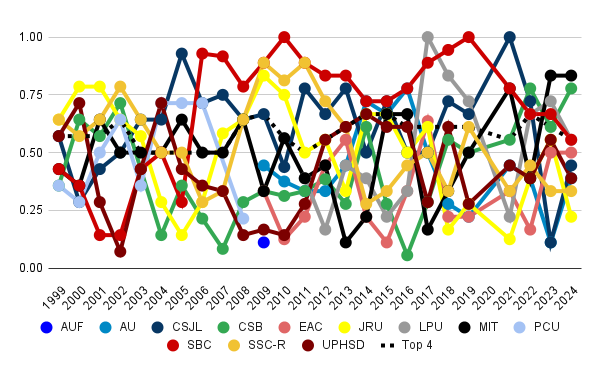
Final team standings for men's basketball since 1999.

In the context of basketball in the Philippines, the NCAA Final Four is the playoffs of the National Collegiate Athletic Association (Philippines) (NCAA) seniors' basketball tournament.

The term "final four" came from the United States National Collegiate Athletic Association's men's Division I basketball tournament which was colloquially called the "final four" ("Final Four" is now the American NCAA's registered trademark).

== History ==
The NCAA instituted the final four format in 1997, discarding the split season format that they have used for the previous 73 years. The change was done due to the TV coverage of Vintage Sports, mimicking the change done by the UAAP four years earlier when Silverstar Sports started covering their tournaments, and to allow more teams to win the championship. The old format reportedly discouraged teams that had experienced early losses to improve their form as the season progresses.

== Format ==
- If no team sweeps the group stage:
  - Seeds No. 1 and No. 2 teams possess the twice to beat advantage
  - Team No. 1 meets No. 4 while No. 2 meets No. 3 in the semifinals.
  - The semifinal winners advance to the finals.
  - The team that wins 2 games in the finals wins the championship.
- If a team sweeps the group stage:
  - Seed No. 1 advance to the finals.
    - Prior to 2008, the No. 1 seed had the twice-to-beat advantage in the finals.
    - From 2008 to 2009, the finals was a best-of-three series.
  - Seed No. 2 advance to the semifinals.
  - Teams No. 3 and No. 4 face off to meet No. 2 in the semifinals in a one-game playoff.
  - In the finals, either the No. 1 seed or the other opponent has to win twice. From 2008 to 2016, seed No. 1 earned a thrice-to-beat advantage (or a 1−0 incentive lead in a virtual best-of-five Finals series).
- In case of two teams being tied, an extra game will be played to determine which seed they will possess.
- In case of three or more teams being tied, a quotient system will decide which team possesses the best seeding, while the other teams will play an extra game to determine the second-best seeding. The winner will face the holder of the best seeding for a playoff slot.

== Statistics ==
=== Seniors tournament ===
==== Appearances ====
Team	Semifinal appearances	Last semis appearance	First semis appearance	Finals appearances	Highest seed
Arellano	2	2016	2014	2	2nd
Letran	18	2022	1997	11	1st
Benilde	6	2024	2000	4	1st
JRU	13	2017	1999	3	1st
Lyceum	6	2024	2018	2	1st
Mapúa	13	2024	1997	3	1st
PCU*	4	2006	2002	3	2nd
San Beda	21	2024	1997	16	1st
San Sebastian	15	2019	1997	9	1st
Perpetual	10	2021	1998	1	1st

Notes:

- Number of appearances excludes 4th seed elimination games.
- PCU left the league

==== Season-by-season performances ====
Key
- Color: Meaning
- Champion
- 1st Runners-up
- 2nd Runners-up, won in the third place playoff
- Semifinalist, lost with twice to beat advantage
- Semifinalist, lost with twice to win disadvantage
- Lost in 4th-seed playoff
- Lost in play-in tournament
- Suspended
- Not in the league
X	Tournament cancelled
1	elimination round ranking
?	unknown ranking
- Guest school
- Under probation

- Number denotes playoff seeding.
- Shade denotes final position.

School	NCAA Season																												
School	73	74	75	76	77	78	79	80	81	82	83	84	85	86	87	88	89	90	91	92	93	94	95	96 (Note: 2020-21 season had a basketball tournament, but it was basically a skills showdown, due to the restrictions of the COVID-19 pandemic in the Philippines.)	97 (Note: 2021-22 season was played in early 2022 and the tournament was held in into a round robin tournament instead of the usual double round eliminations.)	98	99	100	101 (Note: For 2025-26 season onwards, the Final Four format was replaced with an expanded playoff format that saw all 10 teams participate in the playoffs.)
AUF (Note: AUF pulled out of the league in 2010.)	--												10	--															
Arellano	--												5	6	7	8	7	2	5	2	6	8	10	X	6	7	10	7	
Letran	3	1	4	7	6	6	1	3	1	3	2	3	4	5	3	3	2	6	2	6	5	3	3	X	1	2	9	6	
Benilde	--	?	7	3	4	2	6	8	6	8	7	6	8	7	8	9	9	5	8	10	8	5	5	X	5	1	4	2	
EAC	--												7	9	10	7	5	9	10	8	7	9	9	X	7	10	7	5	
JRU	6	7	2	1	1	4	3	7	8	7	3	2	3	3	4	5	8	3	4	5	3	10	8	X	10	9	6	10	
Lyceum	--														6	10	6	7	9	9	1	2	2	X	9	3	2	4	
Mapúa	4	?	6	5	3	5	4	5	3	4	4	4	6	4	5	6	10	10	3	3	10	7	6	X	2	6	1	1	
PCU (Note: PCU pulled out of the league in 2009.)	7	?	8	8	5	3	8	2	2	2		7	--																
San Beda	2	4	5	6	8	7	5	4	7	1	1	1	1	1	1	1	1	1	1	1	2	1	1	X	3	4	3	3	
San Sebastian	1	2	1	4	2	1	2	6	4	6	5	5	2	2	2	2	3	8	7	7	4	6	4	X	8	5	8	9	
Perpetual	5	3	3	2	7	8	7	1	5	5	6	8	9	8	9	4	4	4	6	4	9	4	7	X	4	8	5	8	

==== Semifinals and knockout games ====
Team	Pld	W	L	PCT
San Beda	31	24	7	0.774
PCU	7	5	2	0.714
Letran	30	19	11	0.633
Benilde	12	7	5	0.583
San Sebastian	26	13	13	0.500
Mapúa	22	9	13	0.409
JRU	22	8	14	0.363
Perpetual	20	6	14	0.300
Arellano	8	2	6	0.250
Lyceum	6	1	5	0.167

===== Finals =====
Team	Pld	W	L	PCT
San Beda	34	24	10	0.706
Letran	29	18	11	0.620
PCU	8	4	4	0.500
Mapúa	7	3	4	0.429
San Sebastian	19	8	11	0.421
Benilde	9	3	6	0.333
JRU	8	2	6	0.250
Arellano	4	0	4	0.000
Lyceum	4	0	4	0.000
Perpetual	2	0	2	0.000

===== Entire playoffs =====
Team	Pld	W	L	PCT
San Beda	65	48	17	0.738
Letran	59	37	22	0.627
PCU	15	9	6	0.600
Benilde	21	10	11	0.476
San Sebastian	45	21	24	0.467
Mapúa	29	12	17	0.414
JRU	30	10	20	0.333
Perpetual	22	6	16	0.273
Arellano	12	2	10	0.167
Lyceum	9	1	9	0.111

==== Finals statistics ====
- Most lopsided game: San Sebastian 95-62 JRC, 2001 Game 3 (33 points)
- Closest game: Several games, all one-point leads:
  - Letran 75-74 JRC, 1999 Game 1
  - San Sebastian 79-78 Benilde, 2002 Game 1
  - San Beda 68-67 PCU, 2006 Game 3
  - Letran 65-64 San Beda, 2019 Game 1
- Finals appearances: San Beda, 15; Letran 11; and San Sebastian, 9
- Consecutive finals appearances: San Beda, 14 (2006–19); San Sebastian, 4 (2000–03)
- Championships: San Beda (2006–08, 2010–14, 2016–18), 11; Letran(1998–99, 2003, 2005, 2015, 2019, 2021, 2022), 8; San Sebastian (1997, 2001–02, 2009), 4
- Consecutive championships: San Beda (2006–08, 2016–18), Letran (2019–22) 3; San Beda (2010–14), 5

==== Semifinals ====
- Most lopsided game: Letran 93-60 SSC-R, 2005 (33 points)
- Closest game: Several games, all one point leads
  - Letran 65-64 PCU, 2004 (1 point)
  - Letran 91-90 Mapua, 2015 (1 point)
  - Benilde 62-61 San Beda, 2022 (1 point)
- Semifinal appearances: San Beda 19, Letran 18, San Sebastian 15, JRU 13
- Consecutive semifinal appearances: San Beda 17 (2006–19,2021–23), Letran 7 (2003–2009), San Sebastian 7 (1997–2003), JRU 5 (1999–2003, 2007–2011)

==== Most frequent matchups ====
The most frequently played matchups are:

Matchup	Semifinals	Finals	Total
San Beda vs. Letran	3	5	8
San Sebastian vs. Letran	6	2	8
San Sebastian vs. JRU	6	1	7
San Beda vs. Perpetual	6	0	6
San Beda vs. San Sebastian	1	4	5
Mapúa vs. San Beda	4	1	5
Letran vs. Mapúa	3	1	4
San Beda vs. Lyceum	1	2	3
Letran vs. JRU	2	1	3
Letran vs. PCU	2	1	3
San Beda vs. JRU	2	1	3
Letran vs. Lyceum	3	0	3
Mapúa vs. Benilde	1	1	2
Benilde vs. San Beda	2	0	2
San Beda vs. Arellano	0	2	2
San Sebastian vs. Benilde	0	2	2

==== Seeds ====
In the 26 tournaments the final four format has been applied, the higher seed has beaten the lower seeds in the semifinals due to their twice to beat advantage, for the most part:

1. The No. 1 seed has beaten the No. 4 seed 20 out of 23 times (87%)
  - The No. 1 seed has beaten the No. 4 seed 16 times on the first game (80%).
  - The No. 1 seed has beaten the No. 4 seed 4 times on the second game (20%)
  - The only times the No. 1 seed was beaten by the No. 4 seed were during the San Sebastian-Letran matchup in 1999 (Letran won), and the JRC-San Sebastian matchup in 2000 (San Sebastian won).
2. The No. 2 seed has beaten the No. 3 seed 22 out of 25 times (88%).
  - The No. 2 seed has beaten the No. 3 seed 13 times on the first game (62%).
  - The No. 2 seed has beaten the No. 3 seed 6 times on the second game (29%).
  - The No. 2 seed has beaten the No. 3 seed 2 times in a knockout game due to the stepladder format (9%).
  - The only times the No. 2 seed doesn't have a twice to beat advantage against the No. 3 seed were during the San Beda-Letran matchup in 1997 (San Beda won), the San Sebastian-JRU matchup in 2010 (San Sebastian won), and the Lyceum-Letran matchup in 2019 (Letran won) due to the stepladder format.
  - The only times the No. 2 seed was beaten by the No. 3 seed were during the Perpetual Help-CSB matchup in 2000 (CSB won), the San Sebastian-Letran matchup in 2012 (Letran won), the Lyceum-Letran matchup in 2019 (Letran won) due to the stepladder format and the Lyceum-San Beda matchup in 2023 (San Beda won).
3. The No. 2 seed has beaten the No. 4 seed once (100%)
  - The only time the No. 2 seed has beaten the No. 4 seed was during the San Beda-San Sebastian matchup in 2017 (San Beda won) due to the stepladder format.
4. The No. 3 seed has beaten the No. 4 seed 3 out of 4 times (75%)
  - With San Sebastian sweeping the group stage, there were two semifinal rounds for 1997.
  - With San Beda sweeping the group stage, there were two semifinal rounds for 2010 and 2019.
  - With Lyceum sweeping the group stage, there were two semifinal rounds for 2017.
5. The No. 1 seed skipped the semifinals four times (15%; in 1997, when San Sebastian swept the group stage, in 2010 and 2019, when San Beda swept the group stage, and in 2017, when Lyceum swept the group stage)

A victory of the No. 3 and No. 4 seeds in a series are considered big upsets considering that the No. 3 and No. 4 seed have to win twice, not to mention the perceived superiority of the No. 1 and No. 2 seeds when compared to the No. 3 and No. 4 seeds.

In the finals, the advantage of the No. 1 seed isn't as pronounced since the competing teams have to win the same number of games:

1. The No. 1 seed has beaten the No. 2 seed 15 of 21 times (71%)
2. The No. 2 seed has beaten the No. 1 seed 6 of 21 times (29%)
3. The No. 1 seed has beaten the No. 3 seed 1 of 2 times (50%)
4. The No. 3 seed has beaten the No. 1 seed 1 of 2 times (50%)
5. The No. 3 seed has beaten the No. 4 seed once (100%)
  - This occurred in 2000 in which both lower seeded teams upset the teams with the twice to beat advantage. This was the only time were both teams possessing the twice to beat advantage failed to qualify for the finals in both the NCAA and the UAAP.
6. The No. 4 seed has beaten the No. 2 seed once (100%)
7. The No. 1 seed has won the championship 16 of 25 times (64%)

==== Individual single-game records ====
Stats since the 2001 season.

Statistic	Name	Total	School	Opponent	Stage
Most points	Kevin Alas	43	Letran	San Sebastian	2012 Semifinals
Most rebounds	Allwell Oraeme	24	Mapúa	Arellano	2016 Semifinals
Most assists	Roldan Sara	11	San Beda	Arellano	2016 Finals
Most steals	Roldan Sara	11	San Beda	Arellano	2016 Finals
Most blocks	Raymond Almazan; Mark Andaya	9	Letran	San Sebastian	2013 Semifinals; 2005 Semifinals

=== Juniors tournament ===
==== Appearances ====
Team	Semifinal appearances	Last semis appearance	First semis appearance	Finals appearances	Highest seed
AU	0	-	-	0	-
CSJL	0	-	-	0	-
LSGH	0	-	-	0	-
EAC–ICA	0	-	-	0	-
JRU	0	-	-	0	-
MIT/MHSS	0	-	-	0	-
PCU	0	-	-	0	-
SBU–R	0	-	-	0	-
SSC–R	0	-	-	0	-
UPHSD	0	-	-	0	-

Notes:

- Number of appearances excludes 4th seed elimination games.

==== Season-by-season performances performances ====
Key
- Color: Meaning
- Champion
- 1st Runners-up
- 2nd Runners-up, won in the third place playoff
- Semifinalist, lost with twice to beat advantage
- Semifinalist, lost with twice to win disadvantage
- Lost in 4th-seed playoff
- Suspended
- Not in the league
- Did not join
C	Tournament cancelled
1	group stage ranking
?	unknown ranking
- Guest school
- Under probation

- Number denotes playoff seeding.
- Shade denotes final position.

School	NCAA Season																										
School	74	75	76	77	78	79	80	81	82	83	84	85	86	87	88	89	90	91	92	93	94	95	96	97	98 (Note: 2022-23 season was played in early 2023 and the tournament was held in into a round robin tournament instead of the usual double round eliminations.)	99 (Note: 2023-24 season was played in early 2024 and the tournament was held in into a round robin tournament instead of the usual double round eliminations.)	100 (Note: 2024-25 season was played in early 2025 and the tournament was held in into a round robin tournament instead of the usual double round eliminations.)
AUF	--											10	--														
Arellano	--											8	9	7	6	9	7	3	4	6	7	5	C	C	7	10	7
Letran	3	4	?	1	6	5	2	7	7	2	2	2	4	2	4	6	3	7	6	3	9	7	C	C	1	2	2
EAC–ICA	--											9	8	4	9	8	10	6	9	10	10	10	C	C	10	6	5
JRU	?	?	?	?	?	?	?	4	4	4	3	4	6	8	7	5	4	9	8	9	4	6	C	C	9	8	9
LSGH	--	?	?	?	?	?	4	5	5	5	4	6	5	3	3	3	5	4	3	4	1	4	C	C	3	7	3
Lyceum–Cavite	--													10	10	10	8	5	5	8	5	2	C	C	8	9	10
Mapúa/Malayan (Note: The Mapúa High School was closed down in 2005.) (Note: Since 2008, the Malayan High School of Science Red Robins represented Mapúa University in the juniors' division.)	?	1	1	?	?	?	?				7	7	7	5	5	4	1	2	2	2	2	9	C	C	4	4	6
PCU	?	?	?	?	?	?	3	3	1			--															
San Beda–Rizal	1	2	3	2	1	1	1	2	3	3	5	1	1	1	1	1	2	1	1	1	3	1	C	C	2	5	4
San Sebastian	?	?	?	?	?	?	?	1	2	1	1	3	2	6	2	2	6	8	10	5	8	3	C	C	5	3	8
Perpetual	?	?	?	?	?	?	?	6	6	6	6	5	3	9	8	7	9	10	7	7	6	8	C	C	6	1	1

== Television and radio ==
The final four is the culmination of the NCAA basketball season and is heavily covered by the media. With the NCAA as one of the leading collegiate leagues in the country, the final four games are broadcast live throughout the country.

From 2015 to 2019, the NCAA, and the final four games, are broadcast by ABS-CBN's UHF channel ABS-CBN Sports+Action nationwide, being produced by ABS-CBN Sports. Previously, Studio 23 covered the NCAA from 2002 until 2011. Prior to Studio 23, the games were broadcast irregularly by different broadcast partners. From 2009 to 2011 and since 2015, the games are also aired in high definition, through Balls subsidiary Balls HD.

Previous nationwide providers of the NCAA were Vintage Television on People's Television Network and later IBC from 1995 until 1999 and PTV Channel 4 from 2000 until 2001 season. PTV's coverage was produced by MCI Group and later Silvestar Sports.

In 2012, the NCAA, and the final four games were broadcast by TV5's VHF channel IBC's AKTV, being produced by Sports5. From 2013 to 2014 TV5 took over the seniors' games coverage after AKTV was dissolved.

Following the shutdown of ABS-CBN broadcasting in 2020 and subsequently dissolving its sports division, the final four games of the NCAA were broadcast by GMA Network via its UHF channel GTV, being produced by Synergy, as part of a 5 year contract, which encompassed to its centennial season, until 2025, before GMA eventually opt to not renew the contract with the league after Season 101.

== See also ==
- UAAP Final Four
