= Bai Cristobal =

Personal information
- Born: November 24, 1958 (age 67)
- Listed height: 6 ft 1 in (1.85 m)
- Listed weight: 170 lb (77 kg)

Career information
- College: Universidad de Zamboanga; FEU
- Playing career: 1981–1991

Career history

Playing
- 1981–1984: Crispa Redmanizers
- 1985–1987: Shell Azodrin Bugbusters/Oilers/Spark Aiders
- 1988–1989: Great Taste Instant Milk/Presto Tivolis
- 1990: Purefoods Hotdogs
- 1991: Tivoli Milk Masters

Coaching
- 1997–1998: San Sebastian
- 2000–2008: Perpetual
- 2020: Zamboanga Family's Brand Sardines

Career highlights
- As a player: 3× UAAP men's champion; 5× MICAA champion; 6× PBA champion (including 1983 grand slam); As a coach: NCAA men's champion (1997)
Medals
Men's basketball
Representing Philippines
ABC Under-18 Championship
Gold medal – first place	1978 Manila	Team

Arturo "Bai (Note: Also spelled as "Bay")" Cristobal (born November 24, 1958) is a Filipino basketball figure, formerly a player and coach, and now an administrator. Cristobal played for the FEU Tamaraws in the University Athletic Association of the Philippines (UAAP), the Crispa Redmanizers, Presto Tivolis and the Purefoods Tender Juicy Hotdogs in the professional Philippine Basketball Association (PBA), and the Philippines in the junior and senior levels, and coached the San Sebastian Stags and UPHR Altas in the National Collegiate Athletic Association (Philippines) (NCAA). Cristobal later became basketball commissioner of the NCAA for several seasons.

== Playing career ==
=== Collegiate career ===
In college, Cristobal played for on what is now the Universidad de Zamboanga and Far Eastern University (FEU). In 1977, Cristobal was found to have been playing in a ligang labas game, and FEU's finals berth was forfeited. Cristobal was part of the Turo Valenzona-coached 1979 FEU Tamaraws team that won UAAP Season 42.

Cristobal was a part of the Philippine junior team that won the 1978 FIBA Asia Under-18 Championship, and participated in the 1979 FIBA Under-19 World Championship, and the Philippine senior team that participated in the 1979 ABC Championship.

=== Professional career ===
Cristobal started his professional career with the Crispa Redmanizers in 1981; he was part of the 1983 grand slam-winning team. When Crispa's franchise was bought out by Pilipinas Shell, he was the one of the pioneer players of the Shell Azodrin Bugbusters in 1985. Cristobal then went on to play for the Presto Tivoli from 1988 to 1989, went to Purefoods in 1990, then returned with the Tivolis in 1991.

== Coaching career ==
He coached the San Sebastian Stags in 1997, leading them to their fifth consecutive NCAA title, with the first four titles being won by his former college coach Valenzona. Cristobal next coached the UPHR Altas for eight years starting in NCAA Season 76. Cristobal's Altas stint was capped by a runner-up finish in NCAA Season 80, and the 2004 National Inter-Collegiate championship.

== Sports administration career ==
Cristobal was first named NCAA basketball commissioner in 2014, succeeding Joe Lipa, with whom he was the assistant commissioner. Cristobal supported the referees during the bench clearing brawl between the EAC Generals and Mapua Cardinals during NCAA Season 90, where he had called to have the game abandoned to hand EAC the victory. Cristobal was also the NCAA commissioner during the pandemic tournament during NCAA Season 97.

Cristobal is also one of the administrators of the Maharlika Pilipinas Basketball League.

== Coaching record ==
Season	Team	Eliminations					Playoffs				
Season	Team	GP	W	L	PCT	Finish	PG	W	L	PCT	Results
1997	SSC-R	12	12	0	1.000	1st	1	1	0	1.000	Won championship
1998	SSC-R										
2000	UPHR	14	10	4	.714	2nd	2	0	2	.000	Lost semifinals
2001	UPHR	14	4	10	.286	7th	—	—	—	—	Eliminated
2002	UPHR	14	1	13	.071	8th	—	—	—	—	Eliminated
2003	UPHR	14	6	8	.429	7th	—	—	—	—	Eliminated
2004	UPHR	14	10	4	.714	1st	4	1	3	.250	Lost finals
2005	UPHR	14	6	8	.429	5th	—	—	—	—	Eliminated
2006	UPHR	14	5	9	.357	5th	—	—	—	—	Eliminated
2007	UPHR	12	4	8	.333	5th	—	—	—	—	Eliminated
2008	UPHR	14	2	12	.143	8th	—	—	—	—	Eliminated
Totals		136	60	76	.411	—	7	2	5	.286	1 championship
