= Christian Coronel =

Filipino basketball player

No. 20 – Cebu Greats
- Title: Point guard
- League: MPBL

Personal information
- Born: March 3, 1980 (age 46)
- Listed height: 5 ft 11 in (1.80 m)
- Listed weight: 165 lb (75 kg)

Career information
- High school: San Beda (Manila)
- College: San Sebastian
- Playing career: 2007–present
- Position: Point guard
- Coaching career: 2019–2020

Career history

Playing
- 2007–2009: Sta. Lucia Realtors
- 2009–2010: Philippine Patriots
- 2010: Barako Energy Coffee Masters
- 2026–present: Cebu Greats

Coaching
- 2019–2020: Quezon City Capitals
- 2024–2025: Rizal Golden Coolers (assistant)

Career highlights
- PBA champion (2007–08 Philippine); ABL champion (2010); NCAA Finals Most Valuable Player (2001); NCAA champion (2001)

Christian P. Coronel (born March 3, 1980) is a Filipino professional basketball player for the Cebu Greats. He last played for the Barako Energy Coffee Masters in the Philippine Basketball Association (PBA). He also played for the Sta. Lucia Realtors in the Philippine Basketball Association and the Philippine Patriots in the ASEAN Basketball League.

== Professional career ==
Coronel was not drafted in the 2007 PBA draft, making him an unrestricted free agent, but was later signed by the Sta. Lucia Realtors in the 2007–08 PBA season. He became the head coach of College of San Benildo-Rizal in Antipolo.

== PBA career statistics ==
Legend
GP	Games played	MPG	Minutes per game
FG%	Field-goal percentage	3P%	3-point field-goal percentage	FT%	Free-throw percentage
RPG	Rebounds per game	APG	Assists per game	SPG	Steals per game
BPG	Blocks per game	PPG	Points per game	**Bold**	Career high

=== Season-by-season averages ===
Year	Team	GP	MPG	FG%	3P%	FT%	RPG	APG	SPG	BPG	PPG
2007–08	Sta. Lucia	**36**	6.6	.286	.205	.533	.6	.8	.4	.0	1.5
2008–09	Sta. Lucia	33	9.8	**.375**	**.346**	**.762**	1.0	.8	.4	.0	**3.0**
2009–10	Barako Energy Coffee	6	**13.5**	.231	.214	—	**1.3**	**1.0**	**.8**	.0	2.5
Career		75	8.6	.322	.273	.667	.8	.8	.5	.0	2.2
