= NCAA Season 72 basketball tournaments =

1996 NCAA season
Men's Finals	G1	G2	Wins
San Sebastian Stags	85	82	2
San Beda Red Lions	69	80	0
- Duration: October 7–9, 1996
- Arena(s): Rizal Memorial Coliseum
- Winning coach: Turo Valenzona (12th title, 4th NCAA)
- TV network(s): Vintage Sports (IBC)

Juniors' tournament
- Champions: San Beda Red Cubs
- Winning coach: Ato Badolato

The 1996 NCAA basketball tournament was the 72nd season in the Philippine National Collegiate Athletic Association (NCAA). The season opens on July 21 at the Araneta Coliseum and ended on October 9 with the San Sebastian Stags winning their fourth straight championship in the Seniors division.

League membership was raised from six to seven with the entry of Philippine Christian University.

== Teams ==
Team	School	Men's coach
Letran Knights	Colegio de San Juan de Letran	Molet Pineda
JRC Heavy Bombers	Jose Rizal College	Boy de Vera
Mapúa Cardinals	Mapúa Institute of Technology	Joel Banal
PCU Dolphins	Philippine Christian University	Ricky Cui
PHCR Altas	Perpetual Help College of Rizal	Adriano Go
San Beda Red Lions	San Beda College	Dong Vergeire
San Sebastian Stags	San Sebastian College - Recoletos	Turo Valenzona

== Men's tournament ==
=== Elimination round ===
Format:

- Tournament divided into two halves: winners of the two halves dispute the championship in a best-of-3 finals series unless:
  - A team wins both rounds. In that case, the winning team automatically wins the championship.
  - A third team has a better cumulative record than both finalists. In that case, the third team has to win in a playoff against the team that won the second round to face the team that won in the first round in a best-of-3 finals series.

==== First round team standings ====
Pos	Team	W	L	Pts	Qualification
1	San Sebastian Stags	6	0	12	Finals
2	Letran Knights	5	1	11	
3	San Beda Red Lions (H)	4	2	10	
4	PHCR Altas	3	3	9	
5	Mapúa Cardinals	2	4	8	
6	JRC Heavy Bombers	1	5	7	
7	PCU Dolphins (X)	0	6	6	

(H) Hosts; (X) Under probation

==== Second round team standings ====
Pos	Team	W	L	Pts	Qualification
1	San Beda Red Lions (H)	6	0	12	Finals
2	San Sebastian Stags	4	2	10	
3	Letran Knights	4	2	10	
4	PHCR Altas	3	3	9	
5	Mapúa Cardinals	3	3	9	
6	JRC Heavy Bombers	1	5	7	
7	PCU Dolphins (X)	0	6	6	

(H) Hosts; (X) Under probation

==== Cumulative standings ====
No other team had a better cumulative record than the two pennant winners, so playoff for the Finals berth was not played.

Pos	Team	W	L	Pts	Qualification
1	San Sebastian Stags	10	2	22	Finals
2	San Beda Red Lions (H)	10	2	22	Finals
3	Letran Knights	9	3	21	
4	PHCR Altas	6	6	18	
5	Mapúa Cardinals	5	7	17	
6	JRC Heavy Bombers	2	10	14	
7	PCU Dolphins (X)	0	12	12	

Rules for classification: 1) tournament points; 2) head-to-head record; 3) head-to-head point differential; 4) overall point differential
(H) Hosts; (X) Under probation

San Sebastian clinched the first round pennant with a six-game sweep, defeating the San Beda Red Lions, 100-91 on August 23.

On September 26, San Beda finally halt San Sebastian's 10-game winning streak following an 81-80 victory. Both teams carry a 4-0 won-loss card in the second round of action.

San Beda seals a finals date with San Sebastian Stags by capturing the second round flag, winning over Perpetual Help College, 90-83 on October 1, for a six-game sweep in the second round.

=== Finals ===
==== Game 1 ====
October 7

San Sebastian Stags	85–69	San Beda Red Lions
San Sebastian leads series 1–0

Rizal Memorial Coliseum, Manila

Stags' Brixter Encarnacion poured all of his 19 points in the second half when the Lions tried to erase a 34-45 halftime deficit to come closer at 55-60, with 12:02 left.

==== Game 2 ====
October 9

San Sebastian Stags	82–80	San Beda Red Lions
San Sebastian wins series 2-0

Rizal Memorial Coliseum, Manila

Ulysses Tanique put the final nail on the Red Lions' coffin as he stole a pass off Kerwin McCoy for a 79-75 advantage with 24.3 seconds remaining.

=== Awards ===
NCAA Season 72 men's basketball champions
San Sebastian Stags
Eighth title, fourth consecutive title

== Juniors' tournament ==
The San Beda Red Cubs won both pennants, winning the championship outright.
