= NCAA Season 82 basketball tournaments =

Basketball tournaments in the Philippines

NCAA Season 82
- Host school: De La Salle–College of Saint Benilde
Men's Finals	G1	G2	G3	Wins
San Beda Red Lions	71	50	68	2
PCU Dolphins	57	72	67	1
- Duration: September 18 to 22
- Arena(s): Araneta Coliseum
- Finals MVP: Yousif Aljamal
- Winning coach: Koy Banal (1st title)
- Semifinalists: Letran Knights; Mapúa Cardinals
- TV network(s): Studio 23 and TFC
Juniors' Finals	G1	G2	Wins
PCU Baby Dolphins	55	41	0
San Sebastian Staglets	57	65	2
- Duration: September 18 to 20
- Arena(s): Araneta Coliseum
- Finals MVP: Ryan Buenafe
- Winning coach: Raymond Valenzona (2nd title)
- Semifinalists: San Beda Red Cubs; JRU Light Bombers
- TV network(s): Studio 23 and TFC

The NCAA Season 82 basketball tournaments are the tournaments of the Philippines National Collegiate Athletic Association for basketball at the 2006–07 season. The tournaments are divided into two divisions: the Juniors tournament for male high school students, and the Seniors tournament for male college students.

Losing only one game against the PCU Dolphins, the San Beda Red Lions only suffered one loss to finish first in the elimination round. San Beda's Nigerian center Samuel Ekwe won Most Valuable Player (MVP) honors. PCU and the Letran Knights were tied for second place; the Dolphins won the second-place playoff to seize the #2 seed and the twice-to-beat advantage. San Beda dispatched fourth-seed Mapua Cardinals in the semifinals, and the Dolphins qualified to the Finals for the third consecutive time by beating the Knights in their own semifinal. The Red Lions and the Dolphins exchanged blowout wins in the first two games of the Finals; in the deciding third game, San Beda won their first NCAA men's basketball championship since 1978, Yousif Aljamal was named Finals MVP.

In the juniors division, the San Sebastian Staglets swept the San Beda Red Cubs, 2–0, to take their second title, as Ryan Buenafe won Finals MVP honors.

== Men's tournament ==
Team	College	Coach
Letran Knights	Colegio de San Juan de Letran (CSJL)	(Philippines) Louie Alas
Benilde Blazers	De La Salle–College of Saint Benilde (CSB)	(Philippines) Caloy Garcia
JRU Heavy Bombers	José Rizal University (JRU)	(Philippines) Ariel Vanguardia
Mapúa Cardinals	Mapúa Institute of Technology (MIT)	(Philippines) Horacio Lim
PCU Dolphins	Philippine Christian University (PCU)	(Philippines) Joel Dualan
San Beda Red Lions	San Beda College (SBC)	(Philippines) Koy Banal
San Sebastian Stags	San Sebastian College – Recoletos (SSC-R)	(Philippines) Raymund Valenzona
Perpetual Altas	University of Perpetual Help System DALTA (UPHSD)	(Philippines) Bai Cristobal

=== Preseason ===
Former UP Fighting Maroons basketball player and Philippine Basketball Association commissioner Jun Bernardino assumes the role of basketball commissioner for the season.

On a report published on June 12, it was reported that JRU Heavy Bombers coach Cris Calilan, part of the 1972 champion team (JRU's last championship) resigned from the team and took most of the players with him.

To prevent allegations of game-fixing, the Management Committee asked for the help of the National Bureau of Investigation (NBI) to thwart efforts of such activities.

All of the elimination round games after Opening Day will be held at the Rizal Memorial Sports Complex at Manila.

New coaches are Raymund Valenzona of the San Sebastian Stags, and Ariel Vanguardia of JRU. Valenzona is a son of retired coach Turo Valenzona, while Vanguardia who was tasked to replace former coach Cris Calilan, who left the team. San Beda Red Lions coach Koy Banal would be on his first full season as coach of the Red Lions.

On June 22, PCU Dolphins head coach Junel Baculi resigned for health reasons. He will be replaced by Joel Dualan on an acting capacity. Management Committee (MANCOM) chairman Bernardo Atienza of CSB clarified on an interview broadcast during the opening ceremonies that a rumoured seven-game suspension for Baculi for using indecent language in a PCU game on a tune-up league was untrue.

=== Elimination round ===
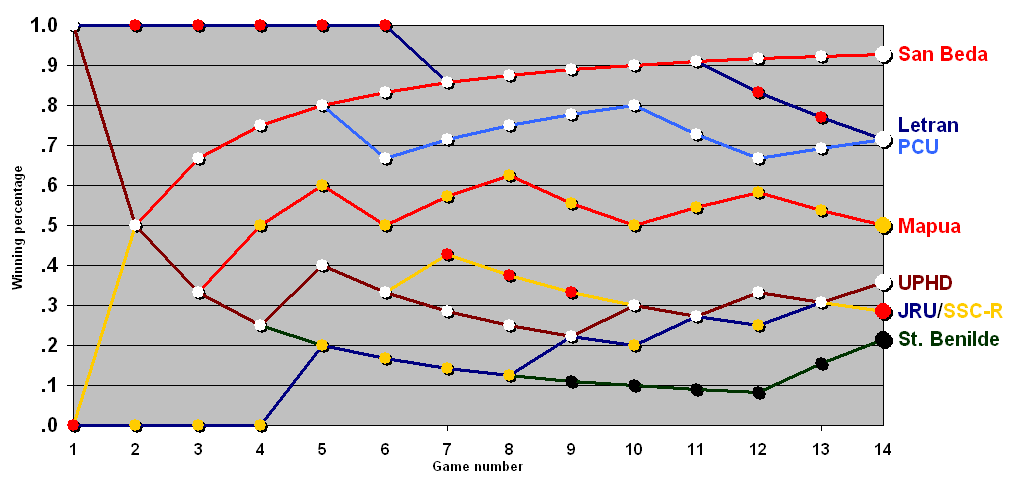
Team standings progression in the senior's basketball tournament.

==== Team standings ====
Pos	Team	W	L	PCT	GB	Qualification
1	San Beda Red Lions	13	1	.929	—	Twice-to-beat in the semifinals
2	PCU Dolphins	10	4	.714 (Note: Second-seed playoff: PCU 67–62 Letran)	3	Twice-to-beat in the semifinals
3	Letran Knights	10	4	.714	3	Twice-to-win in the semifinals
4	Mapúa Cardinals	7	7	.500	6	Twice-to-win in the semifinals
5	Perpetual Altas	5	9	.357	8	
6	JRU Heavy Bombers	4	10	.286 (Note: Head-to-head record: JRU 1–1 San Sebastian (JRU +4))	9	
7	San Sebastian Stags	4	10	.286	9	
8	Benilde Blazers (H)	3	11	.214	10	

Source: ABS-CBN Sports
Rules for classification: 1) winning percentage; 2) if tied for top 4, one-game playoff; 3) head-to-head record; 4) head-to-head goal average; 5) overall point differential
(H) Hosts
Notes:

NBI agents were present in the Ninoy Aquino Stadium, monitoring the basketball games. Rumours still persist that there were still efforts of game fixing in the games. The suspects "resurfaced" during the first-round game between the Blazers and the Heavy Bombers, the day where the agents were supposedly absent.

==== Match-up results ====
	Round 1							Round 2						
Team ╲ Game	1	2	3	4	5	6	7	8	9	10	11	12	13	14
Letran	CSB school colors	SSC-R school colors	JRU school colors	PCU school colors	UPHD school colors	Mapua school colors	San Beda school colors	CSB school colors	UPHD school colors	JRU school colors	SSC-R school colors	Mapua school colors	PCU school colors	San Beda school colors
Benilde	Letran school colors	UPHD school colors	San Beda school colors	SSC-R school colors	Mapua school colors	JRU school colors	PCU school colors	Letran school colors	PCU school colors	San Beda school colors	Mapua school colors	SSC-R school colors	UPHD school colors	JRU school colors
JRU	San Beda school colors	Letran school colors	PCU school colors	UPHD school colors	CSB school colors	SSC-R school colors	Mapua school colors	San Beda school colors	Mapua school colors	Letran school colors	PCU school colors	UPHD school colors	SSC-R school colors	CSB school colors
Mapúa	PCU school colors	SSC-R school colors	San Beda school colors	UPHD school colors	CSB school colors	Letran school colors	JRU school colors	SSC-R school colors	JRU school colors	UPHD school colors	CSB school colors	Letran school colors	San Beda school colors	PCU school colors
PCU	Mapua school colors	San Beda school colors	SSC-R school colors	UPHD school colors	JRU school colors	Letran school colors	CSB school colors	UPHD school colors	CSB school colors	SSC-R school colors	JRU school colors	San Beda school colors	Letran school colors	Mapua school colors
San Beda	JRU school colors	PCU school colors	CSB school colors	Mapua school colors	SSC-R school colors	UPHD school colors	Letran school colors	JRU school colors	SSC-R school colors	CSB school colors	UPHD school colors	PCU school colors	Mapua school colors	Letran school colors
San Sebastian	UPHD school colors	Mapua school colors	PCU school colors	Letran school colors	CSB school colors	San Beda school colors	JRU school colors	Mapua school colors	San Beda school colors	PCU school colors	Letran school colors	CSB school colors	JRU school colors	UPHD school colors
Perpetual	SSC-R school colors	CSB school colors	PCU school colors	Mapua school colors	JRU school colors	Letran school colors	San Beda school colors	PCU school colors	Letran school colors	Mapua school colors	San Beda school colors	JRU school colors	CSB school colors	SSC-R school colors

= Win; = OT win; = Loss; = OT loss

==== Scores ====
Results on top and to the right of the dashes are for first-round games; those to the bottom and to the left of it are second-round games.

Teams	CSJL	CSB	JRU	MIT	PCU	SBC	SSC-R	UPHSD
Letran Knights	—	65–44	74–70	74–71	62–54	59–67	81–73	60–48
Benilde Blazers	63–71	—	70–72	74–79	61–66	57–71	85–89*	79–76
JRU Heavy Bombers	55–70	68–69	—	59–64	77–81	51–81	86–95	77–78
Mapúa Cardinals	54–49	60–42	69–73	—	47–42	55–69	68–76	68–54
PCU Dolphins	59–48	79–70	63–65	75–65	—	70–66	74–72	66–63
San Beda Red Lions	54–43	55–48*	84–69	73–56	73–64	—	71–52	61–45
San Sebastian Stags	56–62	68–63	76–89	57–76	71–81	60–77	—	67–73
Perpetual Altas	54–66	66–68**	67–66	58–53	54–64	57–77	85–69	—

Source: Philippine Daily Inquirer
Legend: Blue = left column team win; Red = top row team win.
Matches with lighter background shading were decided after overtime.

==== Postseason teams ====
The San Beda Little Indians during a halftime performance at the Araneta Coliseum.

- San Beda Red Lions

After making waves in the off-season tournaments, San Beda and PCU emerged as the preseason favorites. After defeating the JRU Heavy Bombers on Opening Night, the Red Lions were defeated by the PCU Dolphins, when Red Lions coach Koy Banal was on duty as assistant coach of the Purefoods Chunkee Giants during their PBA championship game. After Banal and the Chunkee Giants won the Philippine Cup, his return to the San Beda bench signalled the start of a Red Lions rampage, winning their next four games in convincing fashion. Their final game in the first round pitted them against the then undefeated Letran Knights. The game was held to a sell-out crowd and the Red Lions controlled the game. They never trailed during the game and went on to win by eight points, dealing the Knights their first loss of the season.

	1	2	3	4	Total
Red Lions	12	2	13	27	54
Knights	21	5	9	8	43

During the second round, the Lions defeated PCU, the only team that had beaten them in the season and assuring them of the twice to beat advantage in the playoffs. San Beda completed a sweep of the second round with a victory over the Letran Knights in the elimination round finale in a tightly contested and defense oriented game to a capacity crowd at the famed Araneta Coliseum (linescore, right). This sealed their top place finish in the eliminations and sending the Knights to an additional playoff game against PCU to determine the final seeding in the semifinals.

- PCU Dolphins

After losing to Letran in last year's Finals series, the Dolphins returned with an almost intact lineup, except for coach Junel Baculi who resigned due to health reasons (see above). On their Opening Day game against Mapua, they were beaten by the Cardinals in a tightly contested, low-scoring game. The Dolphins then went on a four-game winning streak, including a victory against San Beda. They were beaten by Letran in another tightly contested game but then went on to win four more times in the second round, finally losing to San Beda.

The Dolphins went on to beat Letran and Mapua, thus giving them a shot at the second twice to beat advantage going into the final four. After the Knights lost to the Red Lions in the final game of the eliminations, the Dolphins were tied with Letran for second place. In their playoff game against Letran, the Dolphins controlled the game midway through. Then they fought off a rally by the defending champions and finally winning the game in the final minute. So, after being in third place most of the season, PCU got the number two seed and the twice to beat advantage going into the Final Four against Letran.

- Letran Knights

The defending champions started off the season with a six-game winning streak and seemed poised to sweep the first round of the eliminations. Their final assignment in the first round was against the San Beda Red Lions, who are on a winning streak of their own after succumbing to PCU in their second game. The Red Lions, however came well prepared and jumped the gun on the Knights at the early goings and controlled the game all throughout, thus dealing the Knights their first loss of the season, with both teams sharing first place honors in the first round with an identical 6–1 win–loss records.

At the start of the second round, Letran won four straight (beating the teams in the bottom half of the standings). At the 2006 PBA Draft, four Knights were drafted, including current players Boyet Bautista (Purefoods) and Aaron Aban (Alaska) However, after the draft, they were dealt by successive losses against eventual semifinalists Mapua, PCU and San Beda(A game that was very crucial to the Knights since they are fighting to keep their number two rank in the standings and the last twice to beat advantage in the Final Four. However, after a defense oriented game, they eventually succumbed once more to the Red Lions forcing them into a rubber match with PCU). In the classification game, Letran was beaten by PCU and they ended the eliminations with a four-game losing streak but more importantly, yielding the bonus to PCU in their upcoming encounter in the Final Four.

- Mapua Cardinals

One of the preseason favorites, the Cardinals returned with an intact lineup. After winning against PCU on Opening Day, they were dealt with consecutive losses against San Beda and San Sebastian. After winning the next two games, they were defeated by Intramuros archrivals Letran.

Mapua defeated host CSB, securing the last Final Four slot. Mapua now owned the fourth seed with a twice to win disadvantage against San Beda. The Cardinals were beaten by PCU on their last game of the elimination round.

=== Second seed playoff ===
Letran and PCU ended tied for second place as both teams having an identical 10-4 records, as a result a playoff game for the #2 seed and the twice to beat advantage at the semifinals that goes along with it was held, leading to a de facto first game of a best-of-three series.

September 8
4:00 p.m.

Letran Knights	62–67	PCU Dolphins
Scoring by quarter: 13–12, 9–21, 12–19, 28–15
Pts: Mark Balneg 15		Pts: Gabby Espinas 19
PCU wins the twice to beat advantage

Araneta Coliseum, Quezon City

After a tightly contested first quarter, the Dolphins went on a rampage, posting an eighteen-point lead at the start of the fourth quarter. With increased taunting from both sides, the Knights mounted a furious comeback, trimming the lead to one point thanks to Mark Balneg's 6–1 run. Gabby Espinas made a driving lay-up with 39 seconds left to increase PCU's lead to three points. Aaron Aban missed a three-point and had to foul Espinas, but he made both free-throws to clinch PCU the #2 seed.

=== Bracket ===
Semifinals (Top 2 twice-to-beat)
1	San Beda	55
4	Mapúa	51
2	PCU	72
3	Letran	50

Finals (Best-of-three playoff)
1	San Beda	71	50	68
2	PCU	57	72	67

=== Semifinals ===
San Beda and PCU have the twice-to-beat advantage. They only have to win once, while their opponents, twice, to progress.

==== (1) San Beda vs. (4) Mapua ====
September 13
2:00 p.m.

San Beda Red Lions	55–51	Mapúa Cardinals
Scoring by quarter: 15–13, 7–16, 16–11, 17–11
Pts: Yousif Aljamal 20		Pts: dela Peña, Gonzales, 11 each
San Beda wins series in one game

Araneta Coliseum, Quezon City

San Beda started tentatively with the match but managed to lead early at 10–4 with a Sam Ekwe put-back. After that, the Red Lions offense sputtered, which the Cardinals took advantage of racing to a 7-point lead at the end of the half. The Red Lions managed to crawl back to within two at the end of the third and it was one frustration after another before San Beda equalized late into the fourth period with free throws from rookie Pong Escobal. The Red Lions grabbed the lead for good after a three-pointer from Menor and survived some late game heroics from the Cardinals who came to within a point before good defense from San Beda and a costly Mapua passing error sealed the Cardinals' fate with 4 seconds remaining.

==== (2) PCU vs. (3) Letran ====
September 13
4:00 p.m.

PCU Dolphins	72–50	Letran Knights
Scoring by quarter: 16–8, 22–17, 13–19, 21–6
Pts: Gabby Espinas 16		Pts: Boyet Bautista 16
PCU wins series in one game

Araneta Coliseum, Quezon City

PCU and Letran managed to trade baskets early in the game but the Dolphins played better basketball as they managed to score uncontested layups. The Knights managed to cut the lead into two points early in the third quarter but the Dolphins answered back and closed out the game, 72–50.

=== Finals ===
The Dolphins are in their third consecutive Finals appearance; they defeated the Perpetual Altas in 2004 under coach Loreto Tolentino, lost to the Letran Knights in 2005 with Junel Baculi at the helm, and are now facing the San Beda Red Lions.

The Red Lions, on the other hand, are in their first Finals appearance since 1997, where they were defeated by the Rommel Adducul-led San Sebastian Stags. They've last tasted the championship in 1978, with Chito Loyzaga as team captain.

September 18
4:00 p.m.

San Beda Red Lions	71–57	PCU Dolphins
Scoring by quarter: 20–17, 10–17, 20–5, 21–18
Pts: Pong Escobal 19		Pts: Jayson Castro 16

Araneta Coliseum, Quezon City

September 20
4:00 p.m.

San Beda Red Lions	52–70	PCU Dolphins

Araneta Coliseum, Quezon City

September 22
3:30 p.m.

San Beda Red Lions	68–67	PCU Dolphins
Scoring by quarter: 15–19, 21–11, 25–14, 7–23
Pts: Yousif Aljamal 23		Pts: Jayson Castro 25
San Beda wins series, 2–1

Araneta Coliseum, Quezon City

- Finals Most Valuable Player: Yousif Aljamal (San Beda Red Lions)

It was a nip and tuck affair in the first half of Game 1 with the Dolphins managing a slight margin at the end of the second quarter. San Beda however bounced back and outscored the Dolphins 20–5 in the penultimate quarter to pull away and draw first blood.

San Beda started tentatively Game 2 with poor shooting. Reigning MVP and focal point of the Red Lion defense, Sam Ekwe was also hobbled with a knee injury. The Dolphins took advantage of this situation and efficiently worked their offense to run the Red Lions to the ground in the first half. It was virtually over by the start of the 2nd half as the Lions continue to fire blanks and the Dolphins proceeded to spoil San Beda's bid to end 28 years of frustration.

San Beda ended 28 years of frustration with a win over former champions PCU. Down by 15 points at the start of the fourth quarter, the Dolphins made a furious comeback, cutting the lead to one point with 24.8 seconds remaining due to the exploits of Jayson Castro. After another San Beda turnover, the Dolphins had an opportunity to win the championship with Castro dribbled out the time before passing to Beau Belga; Belga's shot bounced off the rim as Yousif Aljamal rebounded the ball, leading to San Beda's championship. It was the 12th men's championship for the Red Lions. Forward Yousif Aljamal was named Finals MVP, after showing the same offensive consistency that was sorely lacking during their game 2 blowout loss.

=== Awards ===
NCAA Season 82 men's basketball champions
San Beda Red Lions
12th title

Nigerian exchange student Samuel Ekwe got four out of five awards given by the NCAA Press Corps:

- Most Valuable Player: (Nigeria) Samuel Ekwe (San Beda Red Lions)
- Rookie of the Year: (Nigeria) Samuel Ekwe (San Beda Red Lions)
- Mythical Five:
  - (Nigeria) Samuel Ekwe (San Beda Red Lions)
  - (Philippines) Floyd Dedicatoria (JRU Heavy Bombers)
  - (Philippines) Gabby Espinas (PCU Dolphins)
  - (Philippines) Jayson Castro (PCU Dolphins)
  - (Philippines) Khiel Misa (Perpetual Altas)
- Defensive Player of the Year: (Nigeria) Samuel Ekwe (San Beda Red Lions)
- Most Improved Player: (Philippines) Boyet Bautista (Letran Knights)

=== Statistical leaders ===
- Points: Khiel Misa (UPHD, 16.6)
- Rebounds: Samuel Ekwe (San Beda, 13.8)
- Assists: Mark Cagoco (JRU, 4.4)
- Blocks: Samuel Ekwe (San Beda, 2.8)
- Steals: Khiel Misa (UPHD, 2.1) and Floyd Dedicatoria (JRU, 2.1)
- Turnovers: Khiel Misa (UPHD, 4.6)

=== Suspensions ===
Seven players had been suspended by the Management Committee:

- Pong Escobal of the San Beda Red Lions for hitting Bryan Faundo of the Letran Knights with a closed fist. Later downgraded into a warning after San Beda rector Fr. Anscar Chupungco, OSB, appealed the case.
- Rogemar Menor of the San Beda Red Lions for a deliberate foul.
- Alvin Se of the JRU Heavy Bombers
- John Raymundo and Gilbert Bulawan of the San Sebastian Stags
- Riego Gamalinda of the San Beda Red Lions and Lei Navarro of the PCU Dolphins were both issued suspensions after their fraca at their second-round game. Gamalinda sat out the game against the Mapua Cardinals, while Navarro sat out the game against Letran.
- Joferson Gonzales of the Mapua Cardinals for throwing an elbow against Samuel Ekwe of the San Beda Red Lions. Served one-game suspension against the PCU Dolphins (last game).

== Juniors' tournament ==
With the aftermath of the PCU Baby Dolphins eligibility scandal, the NCAA forfeited all wins of PCU in Season 82. The results in this section show the results prior to its forfeiture.

=== Elimination round ===
Pos	Team	W	L	PCT	GB	Qualification
1	PCU Baby Dolphins	9	3	.750	—	Twice-to-beat in the semifinals
2	San Sebastian Staglets	9	3	.750	—	Twice-to-beat in the semifinals
3	San Beda Red Cubs	9	3	.750	—	Twice-to-win in the semifinals
4	JRU Light Bombers	6	6	.500	3	Twice-to-win in the semifinals
5	La Salle Green Hills Greenies (H)	5	7	.417	4	
6	Perpetual Altalettes	4	8	.333	5	
7	Letran Squires	0	12	.000	9	

Source: ABS-CBN Sports
Rules for classification: 1) winning percentage; 2) if tied for top 4, one-game playoff; 3) head-to-head record; 4) head-to-head point differential; 5) overall point differential
(H) Hosts

=== Bracket ===
Semifinals (Top 2 twice-to-beat)
1	PCU	67
4	JRU	66
2	San Sebastian	61
3	San Beda	52

Finals (Best-of-three playoff)
1	PCU	55	41
2	San Sebastian	57	65

=== Semifinals ===
==== (1) PCU vs. (4) JRU ====
September 13

PCU Baby Dolphins	67–66	JRU Light Bombers
PCU wins series in one game

Araneta Coliseum, Quezon City

==== (2) San Sebastian vs. (3) San Beda ====
September 13

San Sebastian Staglets	61–52	San Beda Red Cubs
San Sebastian wins series in one game

Araneta Coliseum, Quezon City

=== Finals ===
Studio 23

September 18

PCU Baby Dolphins	55–57	San Sebastian Staglets

Araneta Coliseum, Quezon City

Studio 23

September 20

PCU Baby Dolphins	41–65	San Sebastian Staglets
San Sebastian wins series, 2–0

Araneta Coliseum, Quezon City

- Finals Most Valuable Player: Ryan Buenafe (San Sebastian Staglets)

=== Awards ===
NCAA Season 82 juniors' basketball champions
San Sebastian Staglets
Third title, second consecutive title

Jake Pascual won four individual awards in the Juniors' division. They were all returned after the conclusion of PCU High School's eligibility scandal.

- Season Most Valuable Player: Jake Pascual (PCU Baby Dolphins)
- Rookie of the Year: Jake Pascual (PCU Baby Dolphins)
- Mythical Five:
  - Jake Pascual (PCU Baby Dolphins)
  - Ryan Buenafe (San Sebastian Staglets)
  - Raycon Kabigting (JRU Light Bombers)
  - Carlo Lituania (JRU Light Bombers)
  - Julius Wong (Letran Squires)
- Defensive Player of the Year: Jake Pascual (PCU Baby Dolphins)
- Most Improved Player: Michael Dizon (Perpetual Junior Altas)

== See also ==
- UAAP Season 69 basketball tournaments

Preceded by Season 81 (2005)	NCAA basketball seasons Season 82 (2006)	Succeeded by Season 83 (2007)
