= Ato Tolentino =

Filipino basketball player (1947–2023)

Personal information
- Born: December 9, 1947
- Died: November 5, 2023 (aged 75)
- Listed height: 6 ft 0 in (1.83 m)
- Listed weight: 160 lb (73 kg)

Career information
- College: UM; FEU
- Playing career: 1975–1979

Career history

Playing
- 1975–1979: Presto / Great Taste

Coaching
- 1980–1986, 1992–2007: UM
- 2004: PCU
- 2005–2007: RTU
- 2014–2017: PCU

Career highlights
- As head coach: 3× National Inter-Collegiate Championships; 5× NAASCU men's champion (2001–2005); NCAA men's champion (2004)

Loreto "Ato" Vianzon Tolentino (December 9, 1947 – November 5, 2023) was a Filipino professional basketball player and later coach.

== Career ==
=== Playing career ===
==== College ====
Tolentino played for the basketball team of University of Manila (UM) where he obtained his marketing degree. He also played for the Far Eastern University where he pursued a degree in banking and finance.

==== PBA ====
Tolentino would earn the moniker "Mr. Hotshot" as a player. He suited up for Presto (later Great Taste) from 1975 until 1979 when he was forced to retire due to a torn cartilage on his left knee. He was among the highest paid players at the time with a reported wage of ₱12,000 monthly.

==== National team ====
Tolentino played for the Philippine national team in the Pesta Sukan Games in Singapore alongside Sonny Reyes and Tembong Melencio.

=== Coaching career ===
After his career ending injury, Tolentino would go back to basketball as a coach. He first coached the UM Hawks, his alma mater from 1980 to 1986. In between those periods he also coached Rizal Athletic Club and ERDC in the now defunct Philippine Amateur Basketball League.

His coaching stint would be put to hiatus in 1986 when he moved to United States. He returned to the Philippines in 1992 to coach UM once again. He helped the Hawks win various titles including three National Inter-Collegiate championships and five straight NAASCU titles.

Tolentino helped Philippine Christian University's Dolphins secure its only NCAA title in 2004.

== Personal life and death ==
Tolentino hailed from the town of Lubao in Pampanga. His son Elvis served as a councilor in Marikina and is also a basketball coach. His grandson, Kyle is a player in the Maharlika Pilipinas Basketball League. Ato Tolentino died on November 5, 2023, at the age of 75.
