= NCAA Season 78 basketball tournaments =

NCAA Season 78
- Host school: San Beda College
Men's Finals	G1	G2	Wins
San Sebastian Stags	79	86	2
Benilde Blazers	78	69	0
- Duration: September 18–20, 2002
- Arena(s): Rizal Memorial Coliseum
- Finals MVP: Leo Najorda
- Winning coach: Turo Valenzona (6th title)
- Semifinalists: PCU Dolphins; JRU Heavy Bombers
- TV network(s): ABS-CBN Sports; Studio 23
Juniors' Finals	G1	G2	Wins
San Beda Red Cubs	94	95	1+1
Letran Squires	97	81	1
- Duration: September 18–20, 2002
- Arena(s): Rizal Memorial Coliseum
- Finals MVP: JVee Casio
- Winning coach: Ato Badolato (13th title)
- Semifinalists: Mapúa Red Robins; San Sebastian Staglets
- TV network(s): ABS-CBN Sports; Studio 23

The basketball tournaments of National Collegiate Athletic Association (Philippines) 78th season hosted by San Beda College began on June 29, 2002 at the Araneta Coliseum with Philippine Sports Commission chairman Eric Buhain as the special guest, followed by the opening ceremonies, a ceremonial toss together with NCAA Policy Board president Fr. Anscar Chupungco, OSB, and a quadruple-header. Games then are subsequently held at Rizal Memorial Coliseum.

== Seniors' tournament ==
=== Teams ===
Team	College	Coach
Letran Knights	Colegio de San Juan de Letran (CSJL)	(Philippines) Louie Alas
Benilde Blazers	De La Salle–College of Saint Benilde (DLS-CSB)	(Philippines) Dong Vergeire
JRU Heavy Bombers	José Rizal University (JRU)	(Philippines) Boy de Vera
Mapúa Cardinals	Mapúa Institute of Technology (MIT)	(Philippines) Horacio Lim
PCU Dolphins	Philippine Christian University (PCU)	(Philippines) Jimmy Mariano
San Beda Red Lions	San Beda College (SBC)	(Philippines) Jonathan Reyes
San Sebastian Stags	San Sebastian College – Recoletos (SSC-R)	(Philippines) Turo Valenzona
Perpetual Altas	University of Perpetual Help Rizal (UPHR)	(Philippines) Bai Cristobal

=== Elimination round ===
==== Team standing ====
Pos	Team	W	L	PCT	GB	Qualification
1	San Sebastian Stags	11	3	.786	—	Twice-to-beat in the semifinals
2	Benilde Blazers	10	4	.714	1	Twice-to-beat in the semifinals
3	PCU Dolphins	9	5	.643 (Note: Head-to-head record: PCU 1-1 JRU (PCU +5))	2	Twice-to-win in the semifinals
4	JRU Heavy Bombers	9	5	.643	2	Twice-to-win in the semifinals
5	Mapúa Cardinals	7	7	.500 (Note: Head-to-head record: Mapúa 1-1 Letran (Mapúa +6))	4	
6	Letran Knights	7	7	.500	4	
7	San Beda Red Lions (H)	2	12	.143	9	
8	Perpetual Altas	1	13	.071	10	

Source: The Philippine Star
Rules for classification: 1) winning percentage; 2) if tied for #2 and #4, one-game playoff; 3) head-to-head record; 4) head-to-head point differential; 5) overall point differential
(H) Hosts

==== Match-up results ====
	Round 1							Round 2						
Team ╲ Game	1	2	3	4	5	6	7	8	9	10	11	12	13	14
Letran	San Beda school colors	PCU school colors	UPHD school colors	CSB school colors	Mapua school colors	JRU school colors	SSC-R school colors	JRU school colors	PCU school colors	SSC-R school colors	San Beda school colors	UPHD school colors	CSB school colors	Mapua school colors
Benilde	JRU school colors	SSC-R school colors	Mapua school colors	Letran school colors	UPHD school colors	San Beda school colors	PCU school colors	UPHD school colors	Mapua school colors	San Beda school colors	SSC-R school colors	JRU school colors	Letran school colors	PCU school colors
JRU	CSB school colors	Mapua school colors	PCU school colors	San Beda school colors	SSC-R school colors	Letran school colors	UPHD school colors	Letran school colors	Mapua school colors	San Beda school colors	PCU school colors	CSB school colors	UPHD school colors	SSC-R school colors
Mapúa	PCU school colors	JRU school colors	CSB school colors	UPHD school colors	Letran school colors	SSC-R school colors	San Beda school colors	SSC-R school colors	CSB school colors	JRU school colors	UPHD school colors	PCU school colors	San Beda school colors	Letran school colors
PCU	Mapua school colors	Letran school colors	JRU school colors	SSC-R school colors	San Beda school colors	UPHD school colors	CSB school colors	San Beda school colors	UPHD school colors	Letran school colors	JRU school colors	Mapua school colors	SSC-R school colors	CSB school colors
San Beda	Letran school colors	UPHD school colors	SSC-R school colors	JRU school colors	PCU school colors	CSB school colors	Mapua school colors	PCU school colors	CSB school colors	JRU school colors	Letran school colors	SSC-R school colors	Mapua school colors	UPHD school colors
San Sebastian	UPHD school colors	CSB school colors	San Beda school colors	PCU school colors	JRU school colors	Mapua school colors	Letran school colors	Mapua school colors	UPHD school colors	Letran school colors	CSB school colors	San Beda school colors	PCU school colors	JRU school colors
Perpetual	SSC-R school colors	San Beda school colors	Letran school colors	Mapua school colors	CSB school colors	PCU school colors	JRU school colors	CSB school colors	PCU school colors	SSC-R school colors	Mapua school colors	Letran school colors	JRU school colors	San Beda school colors

Source: The Philippine Star
= Win; = OT win; = Win by forfeit; = Loss; = OT loss; = Loss by forfeit

==== Scores ====
Results on top and to the right of the dashes are for first-round games; those to the bottom and to the left of it are second-round games.

Teams	CSJL	CSB	JRU	MIT	PCU	SBC	SSC-R	UPHR
Letran Knights	—	75–88	96–100*	76–73	56–67	69–64	62–72	76–68
Benilde Blazers	80–85	—	82–67	64–40	72–80	75–73	74–72	82–50
JRU Heavy Bombers	80–76	81–79	—	84–75	77–85	82–80	75–83	84–76
Mapúa Cardinals	80–71	0–20 (Note: Benilde was leading 65–60 when Mapua walked out of the game due to confusion in regards to technical fouls. Benilde player Magpayo was called for an unsportsmanlike foul, his fifth foul that led to his disqualification. Then, he confronted Mapua player Edsel Feliciano. Both players were then called for technical fouls. The referees then canceled Magpayo's technical foul after learning of his disqualification, which led to Mapua walking out of the game, as they questioned the penalty they got from Magpayo's actions after his disqualification. Benilde were then awarded a 20–0 forfeit win.)	74–81	—	74–68	84–68	52–65	73–32
PCU Dolphins	73–83*	77–83	91–94	88–84	—	88–69	72–69	69–63
San Beda Red Lions	54–67	78–85	84–88	68–88	20–0 (Note: San Beda was leading 79–60 when a brawl resulted in ejections of all but two PCU players, and all but five San Beda players. PCU decided not to continue the game any longer, and San Beda were awarded a 20–0 forfeit win.)	—	72–90	77–79*
San Sebastian Stags	74–59	70–67	101–82	87–82	65–72	85–98	—	87–85
Perpetual Altas	64–70	60–70	79–88	64–77	70–72	101–115*	74–84	—

Source: The Philippine Star
Legend: Blue = left column team win; Red = top row team win.
Matches with lighter background shading were decided after overtime.

=== Bracket ===
Semifinals (Top 2 twice-to-beat)
1	San Sebastian	102*
4	JRU	96
2	Benilde	93	106
3	PCU	95*	87

Finals (Best-of-three playoff)
1	San Sebastian	79	86
2	Benilde	78	69

*Overtime

=== Semifinals ===
San Sebastian and Benilde have the twice-to-beat advantage. They only have to win once, while their opponents, twice, to progress.

==== (1) San Sebastian vs. (4) JRU ====
Studio 23

September 11
2:00 p.m.

San Sebastian Stags	102–96 (OT)	JRU Heavy Bombers
Scoring by quarter: 23-14, 24-27, 22-24, 16-20, Overtime: 17-11
Pts: Nurjamjam Alfad 23; Rebs: Alfad, Moore 10 each Asts: Najorda, Falcasantos 5 each		Pts: Joel Finuliar 23; Rebs: Joel Finuliar 10; Asts: Wynsjohn Te 8
San Sebastian wins series in one game

Rizal Memorial Coliseum, Manila

It was a nip-and-tuck affair all game until JRU's Edward Attunga converted two free throws to give his team its first lead of the game, 85–84, with 59 seconds left. San Sebastian's Redentor Vicente was fouled on a drive, but split his charities to tie the game at 85-all with 22 seconds remaining in the final period. JRU's Wynsjohn Te had a chance to win the game but missed a difficult lay-up, sending the game into overtime. Defending champs San Sebastian's trifecta of Redentor Vicente, Clark Moore, and Michael Gonzales needed an extra five minutes to beat the Heavy Bombers and advance to the Finals.

==== (2) Benilde vs. (3) PCU ====
Studio 23

September 11
4:00 p.m.

Benilde Blazers	93–95 (OT)	PCU Dolphins
Scoring by quarter: 15-26, 18-20, 19-19, 27-14, Overtime: 14-16
Pts: Jay Sagad 26; Rebs: Salvacion, Magpayo 8 each		Pts: Jojo Roque 20; Rebs: Leo Gaspi 7

Rizal Memorial Coliseum, Manila

Studio 23

September 13
4:00 p.m.

Benilde Blazers	106–87	PCU Dolphins
Scoring by quarter: 34-22, 23-24, 23 -18, 26-23
Pts: Sunday Salvacion 34		Pts: Bernzon Franco 28
CSB wins series in two games

Rizal Memorial Coliseum, Manila

It was PCU's game throughout the first half of Game 1 when they saw their main big man Bernzon Franco sidelined with an ankle sprain. But PCU maintained its composure to control the distance until CSB's Jay Sagad, Sunday Salvacion, and Elvis Tolentino force a comeback to send the game into overtime. Franco returned to the game, but PCU's treys decided the final outcome and forces the Blazers to a knockout game.

PCU tried its best to close the gap in Game 2, but the Blazers maintained its double-digit distance all throughout the game thanks to their stars, Jay Sagad and Sunday Salvacion. Salvacion finished with 34 points, including four triples and a dunk with four minutes remaining, sending the CSB gallery into a frenzy.

=== Finals ===
This is a rematch of the 2000 Finals, which the Blazers won after sweeping the Stags en route to their first championship.

Studio 23

September 18
4:00 p.m.

San Sebastian Stags	79–78	Benilde Blazers
Scoring by quarter: 14-24, 27-16, 19 -18, 19-20
Pts: Leomar Najorda 23; Rebs: Leomar Najorda 13; Asts: Christian Coronel 6		Pts: Sunday Salvacion 28; Rebs: Sunday Salvacion 14; Asts: Magpayo, Castro 5

Rizal Memorial Coliseum, Manila

Studio 23

September 20
4:00 p.m.

San Sebastian Stags	86–69	Benilde Blazers
Scoring by quarter: 22-17, 21-15, 18-25, 25-12
Pts: Pep Moore 21; Rebs: Leo Najorda 11; Asts: Michael Gonzales 10		Pts: Sunday Salvacion 21; Rebs: Al Magpayo 10; Asts: Jan Coching 4
San Sebastian wins series, 2–0

Rizal Memorial Coliseum, Manila

- Finals Most Valuable Player: Leomar Najorda (San Sebastian Stags)

The Stags were down by as many as 11 points in the first half of Game 1, thanks to the hot-shooting of Sunday Salvacion and the inside presence of Al Magpayo and Ronald Capati. But Stags veteran Christian Coronel took over and made his two free throws in the last two seconds after he was hacked by CSB's Elvis Tolentino to lead his team closer to the championship.

The Stags did not let CSB to take over as they pummeled the Blazers right from the start of Game 2, even held them scoreless for almost eight minutes into the final period, thus claiming their second consecutive championship and eleventh title overall. Leomar Najorda was named Finals MVP.

=== Awards ===
NCAA Season 78 men's basketball champions
San Sebastian Stags
11th title, second consecutive title

- Most Valuable Player: Sunday Salvacion (Benilde Blazers)
- Rookie of the Year: Jerome Paterno (San Beda Red Lions)
- Mythical Five:
  - Leomar Najorda (San Sebastian Stags)
  - Sunday Salvacion (Benilde Blazers)
  - Arjun Cordero (San Beda Red Lions)
  - Marco Polo Fajardo (JRU Heavy Bombers)
  - Bernzon Franco (PCU Dolphins)
- Defensive Player of the Year: Joel Finuliar (JRU Heavy Bombers)
- Most Improved Player: Leomar Najorda (San Sebastian Stags)
- Coach of the Year: Turo Valenzona (San Sebastian Stags)

== Juniors' tournament ==
=== Elimination round ===
San Beda won all 14 elimination round games, clinching a bye up to the Finals, with the twice-to-beat advantage. Letran finished second, Mapua third, and San Sebastian fourth.

=== Bracket ===
Stepladder round 1 (Single-elimination)
3	Mapúa	87
4	San Sebastian	65

Stepladder round 2 (Single-elimination)
2	Letran	90
3	Mapúa	78

Finals (#1 has twice-to-beat advantage)
1	San Beda	94	95
2	Letran	97	81

=== Stepladder semifinals ===
==== (3) Mapúa vs. (4) San Sebastian ====
September 11
11:30am

Mapúa Red Robins	87–65	San Sebastian Staglets

Rizal Memorial Coliseum, Manila

==== (2) Letran vs. (3) Mapúa ====
September 13
2:00pm

Letran Squires	90–78	Mapúa Red Robins

Rizal Memorial Coliseum, Manila

=== Finals ===
Since San Beda swept the elimination round, they have a twice-to-beat advantage over Letran. This is a de facto best of three series with San Beda automatically leading 1-0. Therefore, San Beda has to win once, while Letran needed twice, to win the championship.

Studio 23

September 18
2:00pm

San Beda Red Cubs	94–97	Letran Squires
Pts: JVee Casio 33; Rebs: Ford Arao 21		Pts: Bituin, Melegrito 20 each Rebs: OJ Cua 15

Rizal Memorial Coliseum, Manila

Studio 23

September 20
2:00pm

San Beda Red Cubs	95–81	Letran Squires
San Beda wins series in two games

Rizal Memorial Coliseum, Manila

- Finals Most Valuable Player: JVee Casio (San Beda Red Cubs)

San Beda was in command for most of Game 1, but Letran refused to lose and then took the lead, 90–88. San Beda then tied the game 93–all, thanks to Ford Arao's two free throws, 47 seconds remaining in the final period. In the next play, OJ Cua gave the lead again to the Squires, 95–93. Both teams split their charities in the final seconds, when Squire Marlon Bituin grabbed the miss from the other team, giving the Red Cubs their first loss of the season and sealing the victory for the Squires.

The Red Cubs claimed their 11th NCAA juniors championship in the deciding Game 2, thanks to JVee Casio and Arvin Braganza's outside shooting and Jay Agbayani's inside presence.

=== Awards ===
NCAA Season 78 juniors' basketball champions
San Beda Red Cubs
13th title

- Most Valuable Player: Oliver John Cua (Letran Squires)
- Rookie of the Year: PJ Walsham (Letran Squires)
- Mythical Five:
  - Oliver John Cua (Letran Squires)
  - JVee Casio (San Beda Red Cubs)
  - Ford Arao (San Beda Red Cubs)
  - Jay Agbayani (San Beda Red Cubs)
  - Yuri Escueta (San Beda Red Cubs)
- Defensive Player of the Year: Elmer Espiritu (JRU Light Bombers)
- Most Improved Player: Oliver John Cua (Letran Squires)
- Coach of the Year: Ato Badolato (San Beda Red Cubs)

== Media ==
This was the first season of Studio 23's coverage (later ABS-CBN Sports+Action) has been produced by ABS-CBN Sports which the NCAA games every Wednesday and Friday afternoon at 2:00 PM to 6:00 PM. The commentators were Bill Velasco, Sev Sarmenta and Bob Novales were presenters and alongside Butch Maniego, Allan Gregorio and others.

== See also ==
- UAAP Season 65 men's basketball tournament

Preceded by Season 77 (2001)	NCAA basketball seasons Season 78 (2002)	Succeeded by Season 79 (2003)
