= NCAA Season 81 basketball tournaments =

Tournaments of Philippines' National Collegiate Athletic Association for basketball

NCAA Season 81
- Host school: Colegio de San Juan de Letran
Men's Finals	G1	G2	G3	Wins
Letran Knights	74	78	62	2
PCU Dolphins	79	60	54	1
- Duration: September 19–23, 2005
- Arena(s): Araneta Coliseum
- Finals MVP: Boyet Bautista
- Winning coach: Louie Alas (3rd title)
- Semifinalists: Mapúa Cardinals; San Sebastian Stags
- TV network(s): Studio 23 and TFC
Juniors' Finals	G1	G2	Wins
San Sebastian Staglets	83	81	2
San Beda Red Cubs	76	69	0
- Duration: September 19–21, 2005
- Arena(s): Araneta Coliseum
- Finals MVP: Eric Salamat
- Winning coach: Raymond Valenzona (1st title)
- Semifinalists: PCU Baby Dolphins; JRU Light Bombers
- TV network(s): Studio 23 and TFC

The NCAA Season 81 basketball tournaments are tournaments of the Philippines' National Collegiate Athletic Association for basketball at the 2005–06 season. The tournaments are divided into two divisions: the Juniors tournament for male high school students, and the Seniors tournament for male college students.

Colegio de San Juan de Letran hosted the season, starting with an opening ceremony held at the Araneta Coliseum on June 25, 2005, followed by a double-header. Games in the elimination rounds and semifinals then are subsequently held at the Cuneta Astrodome, with the Finals played at the Araneta. Men's games are aired lived by ABS-CBN Sports via Studio 23.

== Men's tournament ==
=== Teams ===
Team	College	Coach
Letran Knights	Colegio de San Juan de Letran (CSJL)	(Philippines) Louie Alas
Benilde Blazers	De La Salle–College of Saint Benilde (CSB)	(Philippines) Caloy Garcia
JRU Heavy Bombers	José Rizal University (JRU)	(Philippines) Cris Calilan
Mapúa Cardinals	Mapúa Institute of Technology (MIT)	(Philippines) Horacio Lim
PCU Dolphins	Philippine Christian University (PCU)	(Philippines) Junel Baculi
San Beda Red Lions	San Beda College (SBC)	(Philippines) Nash Racela (Philippines) Koy Banal
San Sebastian Stags	San Sebastian College – Recoletos (SSC-R)	(Philippines) Turo Valenzona
Perpetual Altas	University of Perpetual Help System DALTA (UPHSD)	(Philippines) Bai Cristobal

==== Coaching changes ====
Team	Outgoing coach	Manner of departure	Date	Replaced by	Date
San Beda Red Lions	Nash Racela	Fired midseason	July 27, 2005	Koy Banal	July 27, 2005

=== Elimination round ===
==== Team standings ====
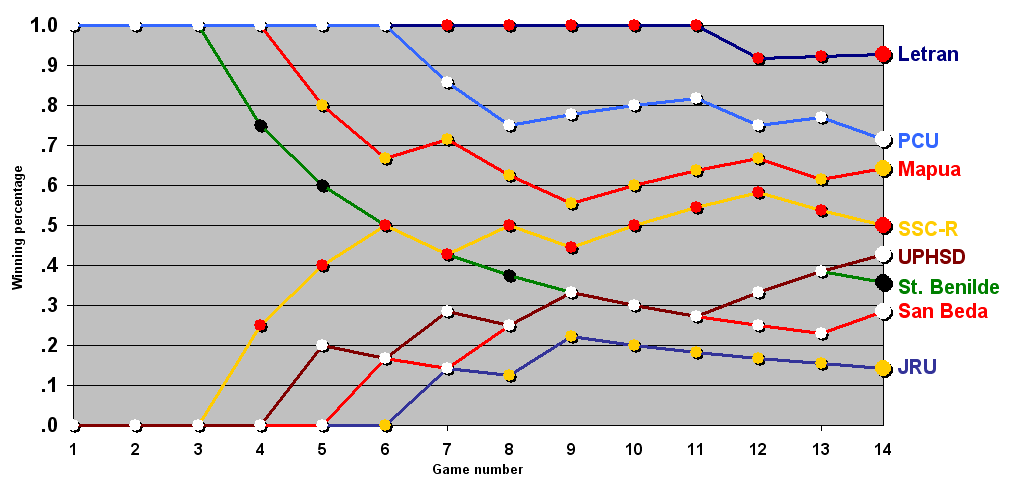
Team standings progression in the senior's basketball tournament.

Pos	Team	W	L	PCT	GB	Qualification
1	Letran Knights (H)	13	1	.929	—	Twice-to-beat in the semifinals
2	PCU Dolphins	10	4	.714	3	Twice-to-beat in the semifinals
3	Mapúa Cardinals	9	5	.643	4	Twice-to-win in the semifinals
4	San Sebastian Stags	7	7	.500	6	Twice-to-win in the semifinals
5	Perpetual Altas	6	8	.429	7	
6	Benilde Blazers	5	9	.357	8	
7	San Beda Red Lions	4	10	.286	9	
8	JRU Heavy Bombers	2	12	.143	11	

Source: ABS-CBN Sports
Rules for classification: 1) winning percentage; 2) if tied for top 4, one-game playoff; 3) head-to-head record; 4) head-to-head point differential; 5) overall point differential
(H) Hosts

==== Match-up results ====
	Round 1							Round 2						
Team ╲ Game	1	2	3	4	5	6	7	8	9	10	11	12	13	14
Letran	UPHD school colors	San Beda school colors	SSC-R school colors	JRU school colors	CSB school colors	Mapua school colors	PCU school colors	JRU school colors	UPHD school colors	CSB school colors	San Beda school colors	Mapua school colors	SSC-R school colors	PCU school colors
Benilde	JRU school colors	UPHD school colors	San Beda school colors	SSC-R school colors	Letran school colors	PCU school colors	Mapua school colors	SSC-R school colors	PCU school colors	Mapua school colors	Letran school colors	JRU school colors	San Beda school colors	UPHD school colors
JRU	CSB school colors	Mapua school colors	Letran school colors	PCU school colors	UPHD school colors	San Beda school colors	SSC-R school colors	Letran school colors	Mapua school colors	PCU school colors	SSC-R school colors	CSB school colors	UPHD school colors	San Beda school colors
Mapúa	SSC-R school colors	JRU school colors	San Beda school colors	UPHD school colors	PCU school colors	Letran school colors	CSB school colors	UPHD school colors	JRU school colors	CSB school colors	San Beda school colors	Letran school colors	PCU school colors	SSC-R school colors
PCU	San Beda school colors	SSC-R school colors	UPHD school colors	JRU school colors	Mapua school colors	CSB school colors	Letran school colors	San Beda school colors	CSB school colors	JRU school colors	UPHD school colors	SSC-R school colors	Mapua school colors	Letran school colors
San Beda	PCU school colors	Letran school colors	CSB school colors	Mapua school colors	SSC-R school colors	JRU school colors	UPHD school colors	PCU school colors	SSC-R school colors	Letran school colors	Mapua school colors	UPHD school colors	CSB school colors	JRU school colors
San Sebastian	Mapua school colors	PCU school colors	Letran school colors	CSB school colors	San Beda school colors	UPHD school colors	JRU school colors	CSB school colors	San Beda school colors	UPHD school colors	JRU school colors	PCU school colors	Letran school colors	Mapua school colors
Perpetual	Letran school colors	CSB school colors	PCU school colors	Mapua school colors	JRU school colors	SSC-R school colors	San Beda school colors	Mapua school colors	Letran school colors	SSC-R school colors	PCU school colors	San Beda school colors	JRU school colors	CSB school colors

= Win; = OT win; = Loss; = OT loss

==== Scores ====
Results on top and to the right of the dashes are for first-round games; those to the bottom and to the left of it are second-round games.

Teams	CSJL	CSB	JRU	MIT	PCU	SBC	SSC-R	UPHSD
Letran Knights	—	65–45	65–50	69–67	70–64*	63–54	78–65	63–54
Benilde Blazers	67–79	—	79–47	64–66	49–63	65–55	63–67	55–45
JRU Heavy Bombers	58–63	58–70	—	52–66	51–68	44–71	67–55	42–59
Mapúa Cardinals	71–66	75–63	43–51	—	49–57	62–53	81–70	67–62
PCU Dolphins	59–63	62–58	67–51	66–57	—	68–50	72–70	54–40
San Beda Red Lions	58–68	86–91*	57–56	59–60	78–72	—	74–77	63–68
San Sebastian Stags	46–65	63–49	65–60	72–100	81–75	63–69	—	76–75*
Perpetual Altas	51–59	63–55	62–48	67–40	51–57	66–60	58–64	—

Source: Philippine Daily Inquirer
Legend: Blue = left column team win; Red = top row team win.
Matches with lighter background shading were decided after overtime.

==== Postseason teams ====
===== Letran Knights =====
The Knights had an amazing streak of eleven straight wins right from opening day. The streak was threatened when they faced fellow unbeaten team, the PCU Dolphins, at the end of the first round. Both sporting 6-0 records, the game went into overtime, and Boyet Bautista and John Paul Alcaraz saved the day for the Knights beat the Dolphins resulting a first round sweep.

The streak ended when the Mapua Cardinals, led by the former All-Canadian Kelvin dela Peña beat the Knights as Letran failed to stop dela Peña and collapsed at the end game.(If Letran won that 2nd-round game against Mapua, the Knights could have already scored a 14–0 sweep of the eliminations) The Knights recovered as they blew out the Stags, and swept the regular season series vs. PCU in the season finale.

===== PCU Dolphins =====
The defending champions PCU Dolphins also had their own 6-0 streak, beating Mapua and CSB. But it was ended by Letran (see above) in a tight contest.

Then came the shock loss against the San Beda Red Lions under San Beda's debuting coach Koy Banal. The Dolphins bounced back, beating last year's runner-up UPHSD Altas. However, PCU was defeated by the San Sebastian Stags in their second round rematch. On the next game, they clinched the twice to beat advantage when they beat Mapua. However, they failed to beat Letran in the regular season.

===== Mapua Cardinals =====
The Mapua Cardinals had their best start in fourteen years as they boasted a 4-0 card. But losses against defending champions PCU Dolphins and Intramuros arch rivals Letran dropped their record to 4–2. A buzzer-beater by Neil Pascual off a Kelvin dela Peña pass against the CSB Blazers kept their Final Four hopes alive. But successive loses against underachievering teams Perpetual Altas and JRU Heavy Bombers put the Final Four aspirations in doubt.

After successive wins against the San Beda Red Lions and CSB Blazers, the Cardinals found confidence in their game, and they beat the then undefeated Letran Knights under the heroics of Kelvin dela Peña and Joferson Gonzales. PCU defeated them again in the eliminations, depriving the Cardinals for a twice to beat advantage in the semis. Mapua bounced back and scored a victory against the Stags. (It can be said that if the Cardinals have beaten the Bombers and the Altas, then they would have been seeded as second, armed with a twice-to-beat advantage in the Semifinals and could've been in the Finals.)

===== San Sebastian Stags =====
After failing to enter the Final Four for the first time since its inception in 1998, the Stags are itching to bring back the glory to their school. With 2003 NCAA MVP Leomar Najorda and Redentor Vicente, the Stags look poised to barge back into the Final Four. But with a disappointing 0–3 start, the Stags needed to win against the then undefeated CSB Blazers (3–0). Under the exploits of Najorda and Vicente, the Stags won the game.

The rest of season was a roller-coaster ride, with San Sebastian winning games against weaker teams. But a win against the PCU Dolphins finally sealed their Final Four appearance.

=== Bracket ===
Semifinals (Top 2 twice-to-beat)
1	Letran	93
4	San Sebastian	60
2	PCU	76
3	Mapúa	53

Finals (Best-of-three playoff)
1	Letran	74	78	62
2	PCU	79	60	54

=== Semifinals ===
Letran and PCU have the twice-to-beat advantage. They only have to win once, while their opponents, twice, to progress.

==== (1) Letran vs. (4) San Sebastian ====
Studio 23

September 9
2:00 p.m.

Letran Knights	93–60	San Sebastian Stags
Scoring by quarter: 23-13, 12-17, 26-24, 32-6
Pts: Aaron Aban 21		Pts: Redentor Vicente 21
Letran wins series in one game

Cuneta Astrodome, Pasay

The Knights, which had previously routed the Stags in their two elimination round games, dealt their opponents a 32–6 fourth quarter run that blew the game wide open and eliminated San Sebastian from championship contention. The Knights qualified for their second Finals stint in three years.

==== (2) PCU vs. (3) Mapua ====
Studio 23

September 9
4:00 p.m.

PCU Dolphins	76–53	Mapúa Cardinals
Scoring by quarter: 23-10, 13-19, 11-18, 29-6
Pts: Robert Sanz 24		Pts: Kelvin dela Peña 25
PCU wins series in one game

Cuneta Astrodome, Pasay

With the game tied 49–all at the start of the fourth quarter, the Dolphins staged a 21–2 with last year's Finals Most Valuable Player (MVP) Rob Sanz scoring key three-pointers to erect a 72–51 advantage at the final two minutes. The defending champions qualified for their second consecutive Finals stint, against Letran, whom they eliminated the previous year in the semifinals in two games.

=== Finals ===
Letran and PCU started their two-year rivalry in the 2004 tournament, when the Dolphins eliminated the Knights in the do-or-die semifinal game that went into overtime via former Knight Ronjay Enrile's flubbed freethrows. The Dolphins then beat 2004's first seed UPHDS Altas in two games, taking their first NCAA seniors basketball title.

Studio 23

September 19
4:00 p.m.

Letran Knights	74–79	PCU Dolphins

Araneta Coliseum, Quezon City

Studio 23

September 21
4:00 p.m.

Letran Knights	78–60	PCU Dolphins

Araneta Coliseum, Quezon City

Studio 23

September 23
3:00 p.m.

Letran Knights	62–54	PCU Dolphins
Scoring by quarter: 23-18, 15-11, 5-12, 19-13
Pts: 3 players, 13 each		Pts: Gabby Espinas 15
Letran wins series, 2–1

Araneta Coliseum, Quezon City

- Finals Most Valuable Player: Boyet Bautista (Letran Knights)

Trailing 65–70 late in Game 1 when Gabby Espinas fouled out, Jayson Castro and Sanz each had a three-pointer in the deciding 11–0 PCU run to put the Dolphins ahead, 76–70 with less than five minutes left. After Jonathan Alvade made a field-goal to cut the lead to three at 74–77, the Dolphins defense prevented another Letran scoring opportunity the rest of the way as they held on to stun the Knights, which had only one loss in the season prior to the game.

In an elimination game for Letran, they scored 25 points in the second quarter to erect a 44–33 lead at halftime. They increased their lead to a commanding 54–33 lead after preventing the Dolphins from scoring in the first five minutes of the third quarter. The Dolphins will cut the lead to fourteen, but that was the nearest they were able to get as the Knights tied the series to force a deciding Game 3.

Letran and PCU were locked in a tight contest at the first quarter, although the Dolphins never led; Letran's Boyet Bautista hit a running three-pointer at the end of the first quarter to prevent the Dolphins from getting close. In the second quarter, Letran twice led by as many as ten points, but the Dolphins limited the Knights to 5 points and a single field-goal to cut Letran's lead. PCU would eventually stare at a 43–41 deficit at the start of the fourth quarter, but Bautista scored on a lay-up that prevent further PCU incursions as the Knights cruised to the victory, and their second championship in three years. Bautista would be named as Finals MVP as he led Letran to their 16th men's basketball title.

=== Awards ===
NCAA Season 81 men's basketball champions
Letran Knights
16th title

In what was billed as one of the league's closest and most interesting MVP races, former volleyball star Ernie Jay Sagad won MVP honors, defeating last year's MVP and Rookie of the Year Gabby Espinas.

- Most Valuable Player:Ernie Jay Sagad (Benilde Blazers)
- Mythical Five:
  - Ernie Jay Sagad (Benilde Blazers)
  - Gabby Espinas (PCU Dolphins)
  - Khiel Misa (Perpetual Altas)
  - Jerome Paterno (San Beda Red Lions)
  - Redentor Vicente (San Sebastian Stags)
- Rookie of the Year: Kelvin dela Peña (Mapúa Cardinals)
- Defensive Player of the Year: Gabby Espinas (PCU Dolphins)
- Most Improved Player of the Year: Aaron Aban (Letran Knights)

==== NCAA Players of the Week ====
Starting on the 2005-06 Season, the NCAA Press Corps has awarded the NCAA Player of the Week award to the most outstanding basketball player in a given week.

- June 25 – July 3: Kelvin dela Peña, Mapua
- July 4–10: Aaron Aban, Letran
- July 11–17: Gabby Espinas, PCU
- July 18–24: Jonathan Aldave, Letran
- July 25–31: J. P. Alcaraz, Letran
- Aug 1–7: Jerome Paterno, San Beda
- Aug 8–14: Boyet Bautista, Letran
- Aug 15–21: Jayson Castro, PCU
- Aug 22–28: Leo Najorda, San Sebastian
- Aug 29 – Sep 4: Mark Andaya, Letran
- Sep 5–11: Robert Sanz, PCU
- Sep 19–25: Boyet Bautista, Letran (Finals MVP)

== Juniors' tournament ==
=== Elimination round ===
Pos	Team	W	L	PCT	GB	Qualification
1	San Sebastian Staglets	11	1	.917	—	Twice-to-beat in the semifinals
2	San Beda Red Cubs	10	2	.833	1	Twice-to-beat in the semifinals
3	PCU Baby Dolphins	7	5	.583 (Note: Third-seed playoff: PCU 96–90 JRU)	4	Twice-to-win in the semifinals
4	JRU Light Bombers	7	5	.583	4	Twice-to-win in the semifinals
5	La Salle Green Hills Greenies	5	7	.417	6	
6	Perpetual Altalettes	2	10	.167	9	
7	Letran Squires (Note: All of Letran's wins were forfeited when a player was found to have played in a ligang labas game.) (H)	0	12	.000	11	

Source: ABS-CBN Sports
Rules for classification: 1) winning percentage; 2) if tied for top 4, one-game playoff; 3) head-to-head record; 4) head-to-head point differential; 5) overall point differential
(H) Hosts

=== Third seed playoff ===
September 9

PCU Baby Dolphins	96–90	JRU Light Bombers

Cuneta Astrodome, Pasay

=== Bracket ===
Semifinals (Top 2 twice-to-beat)
1	San Sebastian	95
4	JRU	82
2	San Beda	80
3	PCU	73

Finals (Best-of-three playoff)
1	San Sebastian	83	81
2	San Beda	76	69

=== Semifinals ===
==== (1) San Sebastian vs. (4) JRU ====
September 14

San Sebastian Staglets	95–82	JRU Light Bombers
San Sebastian wins series in one game

Cuneta Astrodome, Pasay

==== (2) San Beda vs. (3) PCU ====
September 14

San Beda Red Cubs	80–73	PCU Baby Dolphins
San Beda wins series in one game

Cuneta Astrodome, Pasay

=== Finals ===
Studio 23

September 19

San Sebastian Staglets	83–76	San Beda Red Cubs

Araneta Coliseum, Quezon City

Studio 23

September 21

San Sebastian Staglets	81–69	San Beda Red Cubs
San Sebastian wins series, 2–0

Araneta Coliseum, Quezon City

- Finals Most Valuable Player: Eric Salamat (San Sebastian Staglets)

=== Awards ===
NCAA Season 81 juniors' basketball champions
San Sebastian Staglets
Second title

- Most Valuable Player: Allan Mangahas (PCU Baby Dolphins)
- Rookie of the Year: Darell Green (Letran Squires)
- Mythical Five:
  - Allan Mangahas (PCU Baby Dolphins)
  - Darell Green (Letran Squires)
  - John Derico Lopez (JRU Light Bombers)
  - Borgie Hermida (San Beda Red Cubs)
  - Paul Lee (San Sebastian Staglets)
- Defensive Player of the Year: Darell Green (Letran Squires)
- Most Improved Player of the Year: Paolo Guidaben (San Sebastian Staglets)

== See also ==
- UAAP Season 68 men's basketball tournament

Preceded by Season 80 (2004)	NCAA basketball seasons Season 81 (2005)	Succeeded by Season 82 (2006)
