= NCAA Season 73 basketball tournaments =

1997 NCAA season
- Host school: San Sebastian College – Recoletos
| Men's Finals | G1 | Wins |
|---|---|---|
| San Sebastian Stags | 84 | 1+1 |
| San Beda Red Lions | 72 | 0 |
- Duration: October 5, 1997
- Arena(s): Rizal Memorial Coliseum
- Winning coach: Arturo Cristobal
- TV network(s): Vintage Sports (IBC)
| Juniors' Finals | G1 | G2 | Wins |
|---|---|---|---|
| San Beda Red Cubs | 63 | 60 | 0 |
| Mapua Red Robins | 64 | 78 | 2 |
- Duration: October 1997
- Arena(s): Rizal Memorial Coliseum

The 1997 NCAA basketball tournament was the 73rd season in the Philippine National Collegiate Athletic Association (NCAA). The season opened on August 2, 1997 at the Araneta Coliseum and ended on October 6, 1997 with the San Sebastian Stags winning their fifth straight championship in the Seniors division.

This was the first-ever final four semifinals.

== Men's tournament ==
=== Elimination round ===
| Pos | Team | W | L | Pts | Qualification |
|---|---|---|---|---|---|
| 1 | San Sebastian Stags (H) | 12 | 0 | 24 | Twice-to-beat in the Finals (Note: As San Sebastian won all of their elimination round games, the stepladder format will be used instead of the regular Final Four format.) |
| 2 | San Beda Red Lions | 8 | 4 | 20 | Proceed to stepladder round 2 |
| 3 | Letran Knights | 7 | 5 | 19 (Note: Head-to-head record: Letran 2–0 Mapua) | Proceed to stepladder round 1 |
| 4 | Mapúa Cardinals | 7 | 5 | 19 | Proceed to stepladder round 1 |
| 5 | Perpetual Altas | 6 | 6 | 18 | |
| 6 | JRC Heavy Bombers | 2 | 10 | 14 | |
| 7 | PCU Dolphins (X) | 0 | 12 | 12 | |

(H) Hosts; (X) Under probation

=== Bracket ===
Stepladder round 1 (Single-elimination)
3 | Letran | 68
4 | Mapúa | 57

Stepladder round 2 (Single-elimination)
2 | San Beda | 72
3 | Letran | 65

Finals (No. 1 twice-to-beat)
1 | San Sebastian | 84
2 | San Beda | 72

=== Stepladder semifinals ===
Both rounds are straight knockout matches.

==== (3) Letran vs. (4) Mapúa ====
October 1

| Letran Knights | 68–57 | Mapúa Cardinals |
Letran advances to the 2nd round

Rizal Memorial Coliseum, Manila

Letran Knights beat Mapua Cardinals, 68–57, on October 1, in the first of two knockout matches to determine defending champion San Sebastian College's finals opponent. The Stags completed a 12-game elimination round sweep to automatically clinch the first finals slot.

==== (2) San Beda vs. (3) Letran ====
October 3

| San Beda Red Lions | 72–65 | Letran Knights |
San Beda advances to the Finals

Rizal Memorial Coliseum, Manila

San Beda Red Lions finished second and drew a bye; they defeated Letran Knights two nights later, 72–65, and arranged a title clash with San Sebastian Stags.

=== Finals ===
San Sebastian has the twice-to-beat advantage over San Beda, who only has to lose once to lose the series.

==== Game 1 ====
October 5

| San Sebastian Stags | 84–72 | San Beda Red Lions |
San Sebastian wins series in one game

Rizal Memorial Coliseum, Manila

Stags' Rommel Adducul capped another MVP season with 20 points and 16 rebounds while Jasper Ocampo and Ulysses Tanique sparked the Stags' breakaway 25–7 run in the final 15 minutes. San Sebastian won their fifth consecutive title and the school's ninth NCAA crown.

=== Awards ===
NCAA Season 73 men's basketball champions
San Sebastian Stags
Ninth title, fifth consecutive title

== Juniors' tournament ==
=== Playoffs ===
Semifinals (Top 2 twice-to-beat)
1 | San Beda | 91
4 | San Sebastian | 72
2 | Mapúa | 77
3 | PCU | 67

Finals (Best-of-three playoff)
1 | San Beda | 63 | 60
2 | Mapúa | 64 | 78

| Preceded by Season 72 (1996) | NCAA basketball seasons Season 73 (1997) | Succeeded by Season 74 (1998) |
