= NCAA Season 80 basketball tournaments =

NCAA Season 80
- Host school: University of Perpetual Help Rizal
| Men's Finals | G1 | G2 | Wins |
|---|---|---|---|
| PCU Dolphins | 70 | 72 | 2 |
| Perpetual Altas | 68 | 60 | 0 |
- Duration: September 20–22, 2004
- Arena(s): Rizal Memorial Coliseum; Araneta Coliseum
- Finals MVP: Robert Sanz
- Winning coach: Ato Tolentino (1st title)
- Semifinalists: Letran Knights; San Beda Red Lions
- TV network(s): Studio 23 and TFC
| Juniors' Finals | G1 | G2 | G3 | Wins |
|---|---|---|---|---|
| San Beda Red Cubs | 87 | 76 | 88 | 2 |
| Letran Squires | 77 | 81 | 72 | 1 |
- Duration: September 20–24, 2004
- Arena(s): Rizal Memorial Coliseum; Araneta Coliseum
- Finals MVP: Rogemar Menor
- Winning coach: Ato Badolato (15th title)
- Semifinalists: PCU Baby Dolphins; La Salle Green Hills Greenies
- TV network(s): Studio 23 and TFC

The NCAA Season 80 basketball tournaments are the postseason tournaments of the National Collegiate Athletic Association for basketball at the 2004–05 season. The tournaments are divided into two divisions: the Juniors tournament for male high school students and the Men's tournament for male college students.

The NCAA ushered its 80th season on June 26, 2004 before a packed crowd at the Araneta Coliseum. Ricky Palou is the year's NCAA commissioner, the opening rites were graced by the NCAA board members and other representatives of member schools.

Philippine Christian University bagged their first-ever NCAA crown since joining the league eight years ago. The Dolphins swept the University of Perpetual Help Altas.

== Men's tournament ==
=== Teams ===
| Team | College | Coach |
|---|---|---|
| Letran Knights | Colegio de San Juan de Letran (CSJL) | (Philippines) Louie Alas |
| Benilde Blazers | De La Salle–College of Saint Benilde (CSB) | (Philippines) Tonichi Yturri |
| JRU Heavy Bombers | José Rizal University (JRU) | (Philippines) Cris Calilan |
| Mapúa Cardinals | Mapúa Institute of Technology (MIT) | (Philippines) Horacio Lim |
| PCU Dolphins | Philippine Christian University (PCU) | (Philippines) Ato Tolentino |
| San Beda Red Lions | San Beda College (SBC) | (Philippines) Nash Racela |
| San Sebastian Stags | San Sebastian College – Recoletos (SSC-R) | (Philippines) Turo Valenzona |
| Perpetual Altas | University of Perpetual Help Rizal (UPHR) | (Philippines) Bai Cristobal |

=== Elimination round ===
| Pos | Team | W | L | PCT | GB | Qualification |
|---|---|---|---|---|---|---|
| 1 | Perpetual Altas (H) | 10 | 4 | .714 (Note: Head-to-head point differential: Perpetual +4, PCU −4) | — | Twice-to-beat in the semifinals |
| 2 | PCU Dolphins | 10 | 4 | .714 | — | Twice-to-beat in the semifinals |
| 3 | Letran Knights | 9 | 5 | .643 | 1 | Twice-to-win in the semifinals |
| 4 | San Beda Red Lions | 7 | 7 | .500 (Note: Head-to-head point differential: San Beda +19, Mapúa −9, San Sebastian −10; fourth-seed playoff: San Beda 59–52 Mapúa) | 3 | Twice-to-win in the semifinals |
| 5 | Mapúa Cardinals | 7 | 7 | .500 | 3 | |
| 6 | San Sebastian Stags | 7 | 7 | .500 | 3 | |
| 7 | JRU Heavy Bombers | 4 | 10 | .286 | 6 | |
| 8 | Benilde Blazers | 2 | 12 | .143 | 8 | |

Source: ABS-CBN Sports
Rules for classification: 1) winning percentage; 2) head point differential; 3) overall point differential
(H) Hosts

=== Match-up results ===
| | Round 1 | | | | | | | Round 2 | | | | | | |
| Team ╲ Game | 1 | 2 | 3 | 4 | 5 | 6 | 7 | 8 | 9 | 10 | 11 | 12 | 13 | 14 |
|---|---|---|---|---|---|---|---|---|---|---|---|---|---|---|
| Letran | PCU school colors | Mapua school colors | San Beda school colors | JRU school colors | CSB school colors | UPHD school colors | SSC-R school colors | CSB school colors | JRU school colors | UPHD school colors | Mapua school colors | San Beda school colors | PCU school colors | SSC-R school colors |
| Benilde | Mapua school colors | PCU school colors | UPHD school colors | SSC-R school colors | Letran school colors | San Beda school colors | JRU school colors | Letran school colors | SSC-R school colors | PCU school colors | San Beda school colors | Mapua school colors | UPHD school colors | JRU school colors |
| JRU | UPHD school colors | San Beda school colors | Mapua school colors | Letran school colors | PCU school colors | SSC-R school colors | CSB school colors | SSC-R school colors | Letran school colors | San Beda school colors | PCU school colors | UPHD school colors | Mapua school colors | CSB school colors |
| Mapúa | CSB school colors | Letran school colors | JRU school colors | UPHD school colors | SSC-R school colors | PCU school colors | San Beda school colors | San Beda school colors | PCU school colors | SSC-R school colors | Letran school colors | CSB school colors | JRU school colors | UPHD school colors |
| PCU | Letran school colors | CSB school colors | San Beda school colors | SSC-R school colors | JRU school colors | Mapua school colors | UPHD school colors | UPHD school colors | Mapua school colors | CSB school colors | JRU school colors | SSC-R school colors | Letran school colors | San Beda school colors |
| San Beda | SSC-R school colors | JRU school colors | PCU school colors | Letran school colors | UPHD school colors | CSB school colors | Mapua school colors | Mapua school colors | UPHD school colors | JRU school colors | CSB school colors | Letran school colors | SSC-R school colors | PCU school colors |
| San Sebastian | San Beda school colors | UPHD school colors | PCU school colors | CSB school colors | Mapua school colors | JRU school colors | Letran school colors | JRU school colors | CSB school colors | Mapua school colors | UPHD school colors | PCU school colors | San Beda school colors | Letran school colors |
| Perpetual | JRU school colors | SSC-R school colors | CSB school colors | San Beda school colors | Mapua school colors | Letran school colors | PCU school colors | PCU school colors | San Beda school colors | Letran school colors | SSC-R school colors | JRU school colors | CSB school colors | Mapua school colors |

= Win; = OT win; = Loss; = OT loss

=== Scores ===
Results on top and to the right of the dashes are for first-round games; those to the bottom and to the left of it are second-round games.

| Teams | CSJL | CSB | JRU | MIT | PCU | SBC | SSC-R | UPHR |
|---|---|---|---|---|---|---|---|---|
| Letran Knights | — | 70–51 | 62–45 | 76–86 | 84–76 | 70–55 | 68–72 | 68–71 |
| Benilde Blazers | 70–96 | — | 74–82 | 87–88 | 66–68 | 60–84 | 74–88 | 75–95 |
| JRU Heavy Bombers | 84–87* | 91–95 | — | 62–76 | 64–72 | 51–69 | 79–81 | 72–61 |
| Mapúa Cardinals | 62–60 | 103–97 | 76–53 | — | 90–85 | 68–65 | 73–74 | 88–98 |
| PCU Dolphins | 80–77 | 72–68 | 73–63 | 91–79 | — | 55–42 | 65–74 | 71–84 |
| San Beda Red Lions | 70–79* | 83–77 | 71–74 | 79–73 | 67–79 | — | 76–68 | 70–75 |
| San Sebastian Stags | 78–81 | 82–77 | 73–65 | 72–67 | 78–84 | 86–94 | — | 65–70 |
| Perpetual Altas | 90–74 | 70–84 | 88–61 | 71–63 | 62–71 | 52–66 | 65–71 | — |

Source: Philippine Daily Inquirer
Legend: Blue = left column team win; Red = top row team win.
Matches with lighter background shading were decided after overtime.

=== Fourth seed playoff ===
Studio 23

September 8
4:00 p.m.

| San Beda Red Lions | 59–52 | Mapúa Cardinals |
Scoring by quarter: 17 –15, 16–8, 13–15, 13–14
| Pts: Aljamal, Paterno, 16 each | | Pts: Joferson Gonzales 14 |
San Beda advances to the Final Four

Araneta Coliseum, Quezon City

San Beda, Mapua and San Sebastian wound up in a three-way tie at the end of the elimination round. However, only the Red Lions and the Cardinals will figure in a knockout match due to their superior tie-break quotients.

San Beda made it to the final four cast for the first time in seven years as they relied on their tested leader Arjun Cordero, who shot nine of his 14 points in the final four minutes to lift the Red Lions past the Mapua Cardinals.

=== Bracket ===
Semifinals (Top 2 twice-to-beat)
1 | Perpetual | 48 | 58
4 | San Beda | 57 | 56
2 | PCU | 64 | 85*
3 | Letran | 65 | 80

Finals (Best-of-three playoff)
1 | Perpetual | 68 | 60
2 | PCU | 70 | 72

*Overtime

=== Semifinals ===
PCU and Perpetual Help have the twice-to-beat advantage. They only have to win once, while their opponents, twice, to progress.

==== (1) Perpetual vs. (4) San Beda ====
Studio 23

September 10
4:00 p.m.

| Perpetual Altas | 48–57 | San Beda Red Lions |
Scoring by quarter: 18–14, 11–14, 2–13, 17–16

Araneta Coliseum, Quezon City

Studio 23

September 15
2:00 p.m.

| Perpetual Altas | 58–56 | San Beda Red Lions |
Scoring by quarter: 15–19, 18–9, 13–16, 12–12
Perpetual Help wins series in two games

Rizal Memorial Coliseum, Manila

In Game 1, Jeff Bombeo and rookie Yousif Aljamal combined for 25 points to lift the Red Lions past the Altas, who were playing without key player Vladimir Joe.

==== (2) PCU vs. (3) Letran ====
Studio 23

September 10
2:00 p.m.

| PCU Dolphins | 64–65 | Letran Knights |
Scoring by quarter: 16–15, 18–14, 12–14, 18–22

Araneta Coliseum, Quezon City

Studio 23

September 15
4:00 p.m.

| PCU Dolphins | 85–80 (OT) | Letran Knights |
Scoring by quarter: 24–21, 25–27, 16–10, 6–13, Overtime: 14–9
PCU wins series in two games

Rizal Memorial Coliseum, Manila

Jonathan Aldave nailed a three-pointer with 3.2 seconds left to stun the PCU Dolphins in Game 1. After Robert Sanz drained his charities in the last 12 seconds for a 64-62 PCU lead, the Knights' Boyet Bautista dribbled the length of the court, drove down the middle to draw the defense to him and made a kick-off pass to the waiting Aldave, who delivered the night's most dramatic basket.

=== Finals ===
A historic NCAA basketball series unfolds when University of Perpetual Help Altas and Philippine Christian University Dolphins vie for their first championship crown. The Dolphins are in their first finals appearance since joining the league in 1996 while the Altas will troop to the championship match for the first time in 15 years.

Studio 23

September 17
4:00 p.m.

| Perpetual Altas | 68–70 | PCU Dolphins |
Scoring by quarter: 21–22, 13–12, 17–25, 17–11

Rizal Memorial Coliseum, Manila

Studio 23

September 22
4:00 p.m.

| Perpetual Altas | 60–72 | PCU Dolphins |
Scoring by quarter: 9–20, 16–17, 20–26, 15–9
PCU wins series, 2-0

Araneta Coliseum, Quezon City

- Finals Most Valuable Player: Robert Sanz (PCU Dolphins)

Sophomore Jayson Castro drain a three-pointer with five seconds left in Game 1 as the Dolphins moved to within a win of capturing their first-ever NCAA crown. Head coach Loreto Tolentino was slapped with a one-game suspension for excessive complaining in their previous semifinal win against Letran. Tolentino's son Elvis called the shots for PCU on the bench.

In Game 2, PCU posted a double-digit lead right from the first quarter and delivered the best first half they could play. The Dolphins dictated the tempo with Robert Sanz and Jayson Castro leading the charge, and rookie Gabby Espinas coming off the bench. PCU coach Loreto Tolentino steered the Dolphins in one of the most amazing turnarounds the league has ever seen. Robert Sanz bagged the Finals MVP award. Before the game, Espinas was awarded both the season Most Valuable Player and Rookie of the Year awards, the first player to win both awards in the league on the same season.

=== Awards ===
NCAA Season 80 men's basketball champions
PCU Dolphins
First title

- Most Valuable Player: Gabby Espinas (PCU Dolphins)
- Rookie of the Year: Gabby Espinas (PCU Dolphins)
- Mythical Five:
  - Gabby Espinas (PCU Dolphins)
  - Leomar Najorda (San Sebastian Stags)
  - Dominador Javier (Perpetual Altas)
  - Ernie Jay Sagad (Benilde Blazers)
  - Christian Guevarra (Mapúa Cardinals)
- Defensive Player of the Year: Leomar Najorda (San Sebastian Stags)
- Most Improved Player: Ian Garrido (PCU Dolphins)
- Coach of the Year: Loreto Tolentino (PCU Dolphins)

== Juniors' tournament ==
=== Bracket ===
Semifinals (Top 2 twice-to-beat)
1 | San Beda | 79
4 | LSGH | 71
2 | Letran | 78
3 | PCU | 68

Finals (Best-of-three playoff)
1 | San Beda | 87 | 76 | 88
2 | Letran | 77 | 81 | 72

=== Semifinals ===
==== (1) San Beda vs. (4) LSGH ====
September 15
11:30am

| San Beda Red Cubs | 79–71 | La Salle Green Hills Greenies |
San Beda wins series in one game

Rizal Memorial Coliseum, Manila

==== (2) Letran vs. (3) PCU ====
September 15
6:00pm

| Letran Squires | 78–68 | PCU Baby Dolphins |
Letran wins series in one game

Rizal Memorial Coliseum, Manila

=== Finals ===
Studio 23

September 20
2:00pm

| San Beda Red Cubs | 87–77 | Letran Squires |

Rizal Memorial Coliseum, Manila

Studio 23

September 22
2:00pm

| San Beda Red Cubs | 76–81 | Letran Squires |

Araneta Coliseum, Quezon City

Studio 23

September 24
3:15pm

| San Beda Red Cubs | 88–72 | Letran Squires |
Scoring by quarter: 23-29, 28-14, 14-21, 23-8
| Pts: Rogemar Menor 30 | | Pts: Lucas Tagarda 17 |
San Beda wins series, 2–1

Rizal Memorial Coliseum, Manila

- Finals Most Valuable Player: Rogemar Menor (San Beda Red Cubs)

In Game 2, Squires star Lucas Tagarda carried his team in the end game, as he made six of his 15 points in the final minute of the game, as Letran forced a winner-take-all Game Three.

In the deciding game, Red Cubs team captain Ogie Menor exploded for 30 points and 20 rebounds, while teammates James Martinez and Jay-R Taganas added 15 and 8 points respectively, as they clinched the NCAA juniors championship.

=== Awards ===
NCAA Season 80 juniors' basketball champions
San Beda Red Cubs
15th title, third consecutive title

The end-of-season award winners are:

- Most Valuable Player: Rogemar Menor (San Beda Red Cubs)
- Rookie of the Year: Marko Batricevic (La Salle Green Hills Greenies)
- Mythical Five:
  - Rogemar Menor (San Beda Red Cubs)
  - Jay-R Taganas (San Beda Red Cubs)
  - James Mangahas (PCU Baby Dolphins)
  - Eric Carlos (San Sebastian Staglets)
  - Marko Batricevic (La Salle Green Hills Greenies)
- Defensive Player of the Year: Marko Batricevic (La Salle Green Hills Greenies)
- Most Improved Player: Jay-R Taganas (San Beda Red Cubs)
- Coach of the Year: Ato Badolato (San Beda Red Cubs)

== See also ==
- UAAP Season 67 men's basketball tournament

| Preceded by Season 79 (2003) | NCAA basketball seasons Season 80 (2004) | Succeeded by Season 81 (2005) |
