= Perpetual Altas basketball =

Perpetual Altas
2026 Perpetual Altas basketball team
- University: University of Perpetual Help System DALTA
- History: PHCR Altas (until 1997); UPHR Altas (1997–2004); UPHDS Altas (2005); UPHSD Altas (2006–present)
- Head coach: Olsen Racela (3rd season)
- Location: Alabang-Zapote Road, Las Piñas
- Nickname: Altas
- Colors: Maroon, Gold, and White

The Perpetual Altas basketball program represents the University of Perpetual Help System DALTA in men's basketball, as a member of the National Collegiate Athletic Association (NCAA) since 1984.

== History ==
The University of Pereptual Help System DALTA has previously used the "PHCR" and "UPHR" acronyms, which stand for "Perpetual Help College of Rizal" and "University of Perpetual Help Rizal", respectively.

=== PHCR days ===
The Perpetual Help College of Rizal joined the NCAA in 1984. In 1989, the Altas faced defending champions San Sebastian Stags. Bannered by Most Valuable Player Eric Clement Quiday and Bong Hawkins, they took the Stags to all three games in the Finals before losing.

=== UPHR days ===
Now called University of Perpetual Help Rizal (UPHR), the Altas made it to the playoffs in the turn of the millennium. With the #1 seed in the second NCAA Final Four and led by Jojo Manalo, the Altas were eliminated by the JRC Heavy Bombers. In the next year, UPHR finished second in the elimination round, but fell again in the semifinals to the Benilde Blazers.

Perpetual next made it to the Finals in 2004, where they lost to the PCU Dolphins. The Altas were then coached by Bai Cristobal and bannered by Dominador Javier.

=== UPHSD days ===
Renamed as University of Perpetual Help System DALTA (UPHSD), the Altas missed the playoffs for seven years. Cristobal left the team after the 2008 season. Replaced by Boris Aldeguer, the Altas were hampered by eligibility issues on its players, which led to Aldeguer's resignation days before the 2011 season started.

In 2012, the university hired Aric del Rosario, which has seen a renaissance in basketball fortunes for UPHSD. Led by Most Valuable Players Scottie Thompson and Prince Eze, and Bright Akhuetie, the Altas made it to three consecutive semifinals appearances. Del Rosario left coaching Perpetual to a winning record, but just outside of the playoff places.

Now coached by Jimwell Gican, the Altas had Akhuetie as its best player and made it to the semifinals again, only to be eliminated by the Red Lions for another time. Coached by Akhuetie's former teammate Nick Omorogbe, the Altas had a losing season in 2017. At the next season, UPHSD appointed Frankie Lim as their new head coach. Lim coached the team to a semifinals appearance on his first year, but missed the playoffs on the second. He then resigned on the onset of the COVID-19 pandemic as the school shut down its athletic activities. In the 2021 bubble season held in 2022, the Altas coached by Myk Saguiguit made it to the semifinals where they were eliminated by the undefeated Letran Knights. The Altas failed to match their 2021 performance, missing out a playoff berth in 2022, and in 2023. Olsen Racela then replaced Saguiguit, who shall remain as part of the coaching staff.

== Current roster ==
NCAA Season 102

Perpetual Altas roster
Players
Coaches

Pos.	No.	Nat.	Name	Height	Year	High School
PF/C	10	(Philippines)	Borja, Aries Cane	6'7" (2.01m)	1	University of Perpetual Help System DALTA
G	8	(Philippines)	Casinillo, Leobert Andrew	6'0" (1.83m)	2	Sacred Heart School – Ateneo de Cebu
G/F	30	(Philippines)	Duremdes, Kenji	6'3" (1.91m)	2	Marina High School (Huntington Beach, California)
SF	25	(Philippines)	Gelsano, Angelo	6'4" (1.93m)	4	University of Perpetual Help System DALTA
SF	19	(Philippines)	Gojo Cruz, Mark Derick	6'0" (1.83m)	3	University of Perpetual Help System DALTA
SF	0	(Philippines)	Maglupay, Rey Allen	6'2" (1.88m)	2	Colegio de San Juan de Letran
PG	4	(Philippines)	Orgo, Shawn Michael (C)	5'9" (1.75m)	4	University of Perpetual Help System DALTA
SG	28	(Philippines)	Pagulayan, Jan Daniel	6'1" (1.85m)	2	University of Perpetual Help System DALTA
SF	26	(Philippines)	Roluna, Jan Yvi	6'1" (1.85m)	1	University of Perpetual Help System DALTA
PF/C	15	(Philippines)	Tulabut, Juan Miguel	6'5" (1.96m)	2	Adamson University
F	5	(Philippines)	De Guzman, Damme	6'5" (1.96m)	1	University of Perpetual Help System DALTA
G	7	(Philippines)	Yuhico, Isaac	5'10" (1.78m)	1	Canyon High School (Santa Clarita, California)
SG	9	(Philippines)	Corpuz, Jim	6'2" (1.88m)	1	University of Perpetual Help System DALTA
PG	11	(Philippines)	Velasquez, Kurt	5'11" (1.8m)	1	University of Perpetual Help System DALTA
SG	13	(Philippines)	Montemayor, Henry	6'2" (1.88m)	1	University of Perpetual Help System DALTA
F	14	(Philippines)	Cauguiran, Ralph	6'5" (1.96m)	2	University of Perpetual Help System DALTA
PG	18	(Philippines)	Thompson, Justin	5'10" (1.78m)	2	University of Perpetual Help System DALTA
PF	54	(Philippines)	Cristino, Jericho	6'3" (1.91m)	1	University of Perpetual Help System DALTA

Head coach

- (Philippines) Olsen Racela

Assistant coach(es)

- (Philippines) Richard del Rosario
- (Philippines) Joph Cleopas
- (Philippines) Myk Saguiguit
- (Philippines) Carlo Archangel
- (Philippines) Jem Ryan Betia
- (Philippines) Allan Albano
- (Philippines) Jamil Lipae
- (Philippines) Gerald Dizon

Team manager

- (Philippines) Anton Tamayo

Legend

- (C) Team captain
- Injured

- Roster

== Head coaches ==
- 1985–1986: Orlando Bauzon
- 1988: Roberto Littaua
- 1989–1991: Tanny Gonzales
- 1992: Abet Gutierrez
- 1994–1996: Adriano Go
- 1997: Larry Galabin
- 2000–2008: Bai Cristobal
- 2009–2010: Boris Aldeguer
- 2011: Jimwell Gican
- 2012–2015: Aric del Rosario
- 2016: Jimwell Gican
- 2017: Nick Omorogbe
  - 2017: Jimwell Gican (interim)
- 2018–2020: Frankie Lim
- 2021–2024: Myk Saguiguit
- 2024–present: Olsen Racela

== Season-by-season records ==
Season	League	Elimination round						Playoffs			
Season	League	Pos	GP	W	L	PCT	GB	GP	W	L	Results
1999	NCAA	3rd/8	14	9	5	.643	—	1	0	1	Lost semifinals vs JRC
2000	NCAA	2nd/8	14	10	4	.714	1	2	0	2	Lost semifinals vs Benilde
2001	NCAA	7th/8	14	4	10	.286	7	Did not qualify			
2002	NCAA	8th/8	14	1	13	.071	10	Did not qualify			
2003	NCAA	7th/8	14	6	8	.429	3	Did not qualify			
2004	NCAA	1st/8	14	10	4	.714	—	4	1	3	Lost Finals vs PCU
2005	NCAA	5th/8	14	6	8	.429	7	Did not qualify			
2006	NCAA	5th/8	14	5	9	.357	8	Did not qualify			
2007	NCAA	5th/7	12	4	8	.333	7	Did not qualify			
2008	NCAA	8th/8	14	2	12	.143	9	Did not qualify			
2009	NCAA	9th/10	18	3	15	.167	13	Did not qualify			
2010	NCAA	8th/9	16	2	14	.125	14	Did not qualify			
2011	NCAA	9th/10	18	5	13	.278	11	Did not qualify			
2012	NCAA	4th/10	18	10	8	.556	5	2	1	1	Lost semifinals vs San Beda
2013	NCAA	4th/10	18	11	7	.611	4	2	0	2	Lost semifinals vs San Beda
2014	NCAA	4th/10	18	12	6	.667	1	2	0	2	Lost semifinals vs San Beda
2015	NCAA	6th/10	18	11	7	.611	2	Did not qualify			
2016	NCAA	4th/10	18	11	7	.611	3	2	1	1	Lost semifinals vs San Beda
2017	NCAA	9th/10	18	4	14	.222	14	Did not qualify			
2018	NCAA	4th/10	18	11	7	.611	6	1	0	1	Lost semifinals vs San Beda
2019	NCAA	7th/10	18	5	13	.278	13	Did not qualify			
2020	NCAA	Season canceled									
2021	NCAA	5th/10	9	4	5	.444	5	3	2	1	Lost semifinals vs Letran
2022	NCAA	8th/10	18	7	11	.389	7	Did not qualify			
2023	NCAA	5th/10	18	10	8	.556	5	Did not qualify			
2024	NCAA	8th/10	18	7	11	.389	8	Did not qualify			
2025	NCAA	1st/5	13	9	4	.692	—	4	2	2	Won third place playoff vs Benilde
2026	NCAA	4th/5	13	4	9	.308	5	2	1	1	Lost quarterfinals vs San Beda

== Honors ==
=== Player honors ===
- NCAA Most Valuable Player
  - Eric Clement Quiday (1): 1989
  - Jojo Manalo (1): 2000
  - Scottie Thompson (1): 2014
  - Prince Eze (1): 2018
- NCAA Rookie of the Year
  - Juneric Baloria: 2013
- NCAA Defensive Player of the Year
  - Prince Eze (2): 2017, 2018
- NCAA Most Improved Player
  - Scottie Thompson (1): 2012
  - Jun Roque (1): 2023

=== Retired numbers ===
- #6, Scottie Thompson (2023)
- #12, Bong Hawkins (2026)
