= San Sebastian Stags basketball =

San Sebastian Stags
| 2026 San Sebastian Stags basketball team |
- University: San Sebastian College – Recoletos
- Head coach: Rodney Santos (1st season)
- Location: C.M. Recto Avenue, Manila
- Nickname: Stags
- Colors: Gold and Red

PCCL Champion (1)
- 2011

NCAA Champion (12)
- 1973; 1985; 1988; 1989; 1990; 1993; 1994; 1995; 1996; 1997; 2001; 2002; 2009

The San Sebastian Stags basketball program represents San Sebastian College – Recoletos (SSC-R) in men's basketball as a member of the National Collegiate Athletic Association (Philippines) (NCAA). The San Sebastian Stags jointly own the longest championship streak in seniors' basketball, winning five straight titles from 1993 to 1997.

== History ==
=== First titles ===
Colloquially known as "Baste", the school has won 14 NCAA seniors' basketball titles. The Stags joined the NCAA in 1969; they won their first title in 1974 led by David Supnet, Jimmy Otazu and Benjie Cleofas. The Stags next title came in 1985; in 1988, the Stags then became the first team to win both pennants, finishing with a 10–0 record and an automatic title. San Sebastian was led by Eugene Quilban and Paul Alvarez. On the next season, the Stags faced the PHCR Altas in the Finals, averting an upset to win back-to-back titles.

=== Five-peat ===
In 1993, San Sebastian began a 5-year title romp, starting with the efforts of Jesse Bardaje and Ulysses Tanigue, giving coach Turo Valenzona his first NCAA title. The Stags won the title again in 1994, again winning all 10 elimination round games, giving Rodney Santos the Most Valuable Player (MVP) award and Rommel Adducul the Rookie of the Year award. They next became the fifth team to win three consecutive NCAA titles, winning the first nine games of the season, only to lose against eventual finalist Mapua. The Stags won all two games in the Finals though.

In 1996, the Stags were gunning for then unprecedented four consecutive titles. In the school's 50th anniversary, Adducul was named MVP and led the Stags to a Finals sweep against the San Beda Red Lions. The Stags won a record five straight titles in 1997, winning all 13 games for a perfect season. Now coached by Bay Cristobal, the Stags had a Finals rematch with San Beda, whom they defeated easily. Adducul had another MVP year, and was backed by Banjo Calpito, Jasper Ocampo, Tanigue, Brixter Encarnacion and team captain Rommel Daep.

=== Turn of the millennium titles ===
Two years later, the Stags were in the playoffs again, but were upset by eventual champions Letran Knights, who were the #4 seed, in the semifinals. The Stags made it to next season's Finals as #4 seed themselves, only to lose to the Benilde Blazers. San Sebastian broke through in 2001, beating the JRU Heavy Bombers in the Finals. In a Finals rematch with Benilde, the Stags won this time to win the title in 2002. The Stags failed to defend the title in 2003, losing to Letran. The Stags barely missed the playoffs in 2004 due to tiebreakers, but made it to the playoffs in the next year, only to lose to Letran in the semifinals. At this time, the Stags were led by Leo Najorda and Red Vicente, and coached again by Valenzona.

=== Pinatubo trio ===
The Stags were not to make the playoffs until 2009; in 2008 coached by Jorge Gallent, they finished joint-2nd with 4 other teams, but a series of tiebreaking playoffs eliminated them from contention. Gallent resigned after the season.

In 2009, San Sebastian debuted three players from Pampanga, the so-called "Pinatubo trio" from Mount Pinatubo. Calvin Abueva, Ian Sangalang and Ronald Pascual, together with senior Jimbo Aquino and coached by Pampanga native Ato Agustin, the Stags finished joint first in the elimination round, and defeated three-time defending champions San Beda. The Red Lions defeated the Stags in a 2010 Finals rematch, and again in 2011, this time now coached by Topex Robinson. Robinson won the postseason 2011 Philippine Collegiate Championship, defeating UAAP champion Ateneo Blue Eagles in the Finals. The Pinatubo Trio, now coached by Allan Trinidad, lost to Letran in the 2012 semifinals. Coached by a returning Robinson in 2013, the Stags would have a semifinals rematch with Letran where they lost. Robinson coached the Stags to a losing season in 2014, after which he resigned.

=== After the Pinatubo trio ===
Rodney Santos, part of the 1990s champion team, was appointed coach in 2015. Santos was sacked after coaching the rebuilding team to a losing season. Now coached by Edgar Macaraya, the Stags made it to semifinals in 2017 led by Michael Calisaan and in 2019 led by RK Ilagan, but were eliminated in the stepladder semifinals by San Beda and Letran respectively. In the return of competition after the COVID-19 pandemic, the Stags ended Season 97 on a losing record, with later results not going their way resulting in their elimination. Now led by Ichie Altamirano, the Stags were eliminated in Season 98 playoffs, with Macaraya being ejected for complaining to the officials. Macaraya was then replaced by John Kallos for the 2023 season. Kallos coached the Stags to a 6–12 record and well out of the playoff places; he was then replaced by Arvin Bonleon.

On March 14, 2025, former PBA player Rob Labagala was signed as the new head coach of the Golden Stags for the 2025 season. Labagala was beset by funding issues, with backers not fulfilling its pledges. The Stags finished with a 3–10 record, and was eliminated in the play-in round. Tony Tan, a Filipino-Canadian coach, was announced as Labagala's replacement. Tan was replaced before the season started; Tan maintained he was on medical leave and he never voluntarily resigned. Rodney Santos, who was handling the team when Tan was replaced, was named head coach. In NCAA Season 102, the Stags finished winless, the first NCAA team to do so since 1997.

== Current roster ==
NCAA Season 102

San Sebastian Golden Stags roster
Players
Coaches

| Pos. | No. | Nat. | Name | Height | Year | High School |
|---|---|---|---|---|---|---|
| PF | 29 | (Philippines) | Acosta, Matt Laurence | 6'3" (1.91m) | – | – |
| F | 11 | (Philippines) | Alforque, Arwin | 6'0" (1.83m) | – | – |
| G | 23 | (Philippines) | Bacani, Caesleyh | 6'0" (1.83m) | – | – |
| PF | 18 | (Philippines) | Barroga, Khit | 6'4" (1.93m) | – | – |
| F | 19 | (Philippines) | Castor, Niel | 6'3" (1.91m) | – | – |
| | 10 | (Philippines) | Chuidian, Franz | 6'2" (1.88m) | – | – |
| SG | 77 | (Philippines) | Cruz, Clarence | 6'0" (1.83m) | – | – |
| SG | 12 | (Philippines) | Cuya, Dash | 5'11" (1.8m) | – | – |
| F | 51 | (Philippines) | Dimaunahan, Markus | 6'5" (1.96m) | – | – |
| G | 7 | (Philippines) | Gabat, Ralph (C) | 6'0" (1.83m) | – | – |
| SG | 6 | (Philippines) | Gomez de Liano, Jordie | 6'5" (1.96m) | – | – |
| | 100 | (Philippines) | Kitane, Axcel | 6'4" (1.93m) | – | – |
| PG | 30 | (Philippines) | Muktimar, Nurben | 5'10" (1.78m) | – | – |
| | 13 | (Philippines) | Ricio, Christian | 6'4" (1.93m) | – | – |
| G/F | 8 | (Philippines) | Salvo, Aethon | 6'2" (1.88m) | – | – |
| | 9 | (Philippines) | Segovia, Vincent | – | – | – |
| PF | 25 | (Philippines) | Suico, Vince | 6'3" (1.91m) | – | – |
| C | 1 | (Philippines) | Velasco, Leonardo | 6'5" (1.96m) | – | – |
| PG | 39 | (Philippines) | Ynot, John | 5'11" (1.8m) | – | – |

Head coach

- (Philippines) Rodney Santos

Assistant coach(es)

- (Philippines) EJ Feihl
- (Philippines) John Ferriols
- (Philippines) Wynne Arboleda
- (Philippines) Louie Empleo
- (Philippines) Richie Melencio
- (Philippines) Migo Santos
- (Philippines) Mac Tan (consultant)

Team manager

- (Philippines) Bernard Yang

Legend

- (C) Team captain
- Injured

- Roster
Updated: 2026-9-19

== Head coaches ==
- 1986–1992: Francis Rodriguez
  - 1989: Art dela Cruz (interim)
- 1992–1996: Turo Valenzona
- 1997–1999: Bai Cristobal
- 2000–2005: Turo Valenzona
- 2006: Raymund Valenzona
- 2007–2008: Jorge Gallent
- 2009–2010: Ato Agustin
- 2011–2012: Topex Robinson
  - 2012: Allan Trinidad (interim)
- 2013–2014: Topex Robinson
- 2015: Rodney Santos
- 2016–2022: Edgar Macaraya
- 2023: John Kallos
- 2024: Arvin Bonleon
- 2025: Rob Labagala
- 2026–present: Rodney Santos

== Season-by-season records ==
=== Until 1996 ===
From 1947 until 1996, the NCAA used a split season format.

| Season | League | 1st round | | | | | 2nd round | | | | | Playoffs | | | |
| Season | League | Pos | GP | W | L | Pts | Pos | GP | W | L | Pts | GP | W | L | Results |
|---|---|---|---|---|---|---|---|---|---|---|---|---|---|---|---|
| 1994 | NCAA | 1st/6 | 5 | 5 | 0 | 10 | 1st/6 | 5 | 5 | 0 | 10 | Automatic champions | | | |
| 1995 | NCAA | 1st/6 | 5 | 5 | 0 | 10 | 2nd/6 | 5 | 4 | 1 | 8 | 2 | 2 | 0 | Won Finals vs Mapua |
| 1996 | NCAA | 1st/7 | 6 | 6 | 0 | 12 | 1st/7 | 6 | 4 | 2 | 8 | 2 | 2 | 0 | Won Finals vs San Beda |

=== Since 1997 ===
Since 1997, the NCAA has used the Final Four format.

| Season | League | Elimination round | | | | | | Playoffs | | | |
| Season | League | Pos | GP | W | L | PCT | GB | GP | W | L | Results |
|---|---|---|---|---|---|---|---|---|---|---|---|
| 1997 | NCAA | 1st/7 | 12 | 12 | 0 | 1.000 | — | 1 | 1 | 0 | Won Finals vs San Beda |
| 1998 | NCAA | | | | | | | | | | |
| 1999 | NCAA | 1st/8 | 14 | 9 | 5 | .643 | — | 2 | 0 | 2 | Lost semifinals vs Letran |
| 2000 | NCAA | 4th/8 | 14 | 8 | 6 | .571 | 7 | 4 | 2 | 2 | Lost Finals vs Benilde |
| 2001 | NCAA | 2nd/8 | 14 | 9 | 5 | .643 | 2 | 5 | 3 | 2 | Won Finals vs JRU |
| 2002 | NCAA | 1st/8 | 14 | 11 | 3 | .786 | — | 3 | 3 | 0 | Won Finals vs Benilde |
| 2003 | NCAA | 2nd/8 | 14 | 9 | 5 | .643 | — | 4 | 2 | 2 | Lost Finals vs Letran |
| 2004 | NCAA | 6th/8 | 14 | 7 | 7 | .500 | 3 | Did not qualify | | | |
| 2005 | NCAA | 4th/8 | 14 | 7 | 7 | .500 | 6 | 1 | 0 | 1 | Lost semifinals vs Letran |
| 2006 | NCAA | 6th/8 | 14 | 4 | 10 | .286 | 9 | Did not qualify | | | |
| 2007 | NCAA | 6th/7 | 12 | 4 | 8 | .333 | 7 | Did not qualify | | | |
| 2008 | NCAA | 5th/8 | 14 | 9 | 5 | .643 | 2 | 2 | 0 | 2 | Lost 4th seed playoff vs Mapua |
| 2009 | NCAA | 2nd/10 | 18 | 16 | 2 | .889 | — | 5 | 3 | 2 | Won Finals vs San Beda |
| 2010 | NCAA | 2nd/9 | 16 | 13 | 3 | .813 | 3 | 3 | 1 | 2 | Lost Finals vs San Beda |
| 2011 | NCAA | 2nd/10 | 18 | 16 | 2 | .889 | — | 5 | 1 | 4 | Lost Finals vs San Beda |
| 2012 | NCAA | 2nd/10 | 18 | 13 | 5 | .722 | 2 | 2 | 0 | 2 | Lost semifinals vs Letran |
| 2013 | NCAA | 3rd/10 | 18 | 11 | 7 | .611 | 4 | 2 | 1 | 1 | Lost semifinals vs Letran |
| 2014 | NCAA | 8th/10 | 18 | 5 | 13 | .278 | 8 | Did not qualify | | | |
| 2015 | NCAA | 7th/10 | 18 | 6 | 12 | .333 | 7 | Did not qualify | | | |
| 2016 | NCAA | 7th/10 | 18 | 8 | 10 | .444 | 6 | Did not qualify | | | |
| 2017 | NCAA | 4th/10 | 18 | 9 | 9 | .500 | 9 | 3 | 2 | 1 | Lost stepladder round 2 vs San Beda |
| 2018 | NCAA | 6th/10 | 18 | 6 | 12 | .333 | 11 | Did not qualify | | | |
| 2019 | NCAA | 4th/10 | 18 | 11 | 7 | .611 | 7 | 1 | 0 | 1 | Lost stepladder round 1 vs Letran |
| 2020 (Note: Season cancelled due to the COVID-19 pandemic.) | NCAA | Season canceled | | | | | | | | | |
| 2021 (Note: Season postponed to early 2022 due to the COVID-19 pandemic.) | NCAA | 8th/10 | 9 | 3 | 6 | .333 | 6 | Did not qualify | | | |
| 2022 | NCAA | 5th/10 | 18 | 8 | 10 | .444 | 6 | Did not qualify | | | |
| 2023 | NCAA | 8th/10 | 18 | 6 | 12 | .333 | 9 | Did not qualify | | | |
| 2024 | NCAA | 9th/10 | 18 | 6 | 12 | .333 | 9 | Did not qualify | | | |
| 2025 | NCAA | 5th/5 | 13 | 3 | 10 | .231 | 6 | 1 | 0 | 1 | Lost play-in vs. Lyceum |
| 2026 | NCAA | 5th/5 | 13 | 0 | 13 | .000 | 9 | 1 | 0 | 1 | Lost play-in vs. Perpetual |

== Honors ==
=== Team honors ===
- Philippine Collegiate Champions League (PCCL)
  - Champions (1): 2011
- National Collegiate Athletic Association (NCAA)
  - Champions (12): 1973, 1985, 1988, 1989, 1993, 1994, 1995, 1996, 1997, 2001, 2002, 2009
- Filoil EcoOil Preseason Cup
  - Champions (1): 2010

=== Player honors ===
- NCAA Most Valuable Player
  - Eugene Quilban (2): 1987, 1988
  - Jesse Bardaje (1): 1993
  - Rodney Santos (1): 1994
  - Rommel Adducul (2): 1996, 1997
  - Leo Najorda (1): 2003
  - Calvin Abueva (1): 2011
  - Ian Sangalang (1): 2012
- NCAA Finals Most Valuable Player
  - Christian Coronel (1): 2001
  - Leo Najorda (1): 2002
  - Jimbo Aquino (1): 2009
- NCAA Rookie of the Year
  - Rommel Adducul: 1994
  - Jerome Barbosa: 1995
  - Christian Coronel: 1998
  - Julian Bermejo: 2002
- NCAA Defensive Player of the Year
  - Jason Ballesteros (2): 2007, 2008
  - Ian Sangalang (1): 2011
  - Rommel Calahat (1): 2022
  - Jhuniel dela Rama (1): 2025
- NCAA Most Improved Player:
  - Michael Calisaan (1): 2015

== Notable players ==
- Brixter Encarnacion
- Calvin Abueva
- Christian Coronel
- Eugene Quilban
- Gilbert Bulawan
- Homer Se
- Ian Sangalang
- Jason Ballesteros
- Jasper Ocampo
- JC Tiuseco
- Jimbo Aquino
- John Raymundo
- Johnedel Cardel
- Leo Najorda
- Michael Calisaan
- RK Ilagan
- Rodney Santos
- Rommel Adducul
- Ronald Pascual
- Topex Robinson
- Ulysses Tanigue
- Paul Alvarez
- Zanjoe Marudo
