= NCAA basketball championship =

NCAA basketball championship may refer to:

- NCAA Basketball Championship (Philippines)
- NCAA basketball tournament (disambiguation)

== See also ==
- List of NCAA basketball champions (disambiguation)
