= List of NCAA Philippines basketball champions =

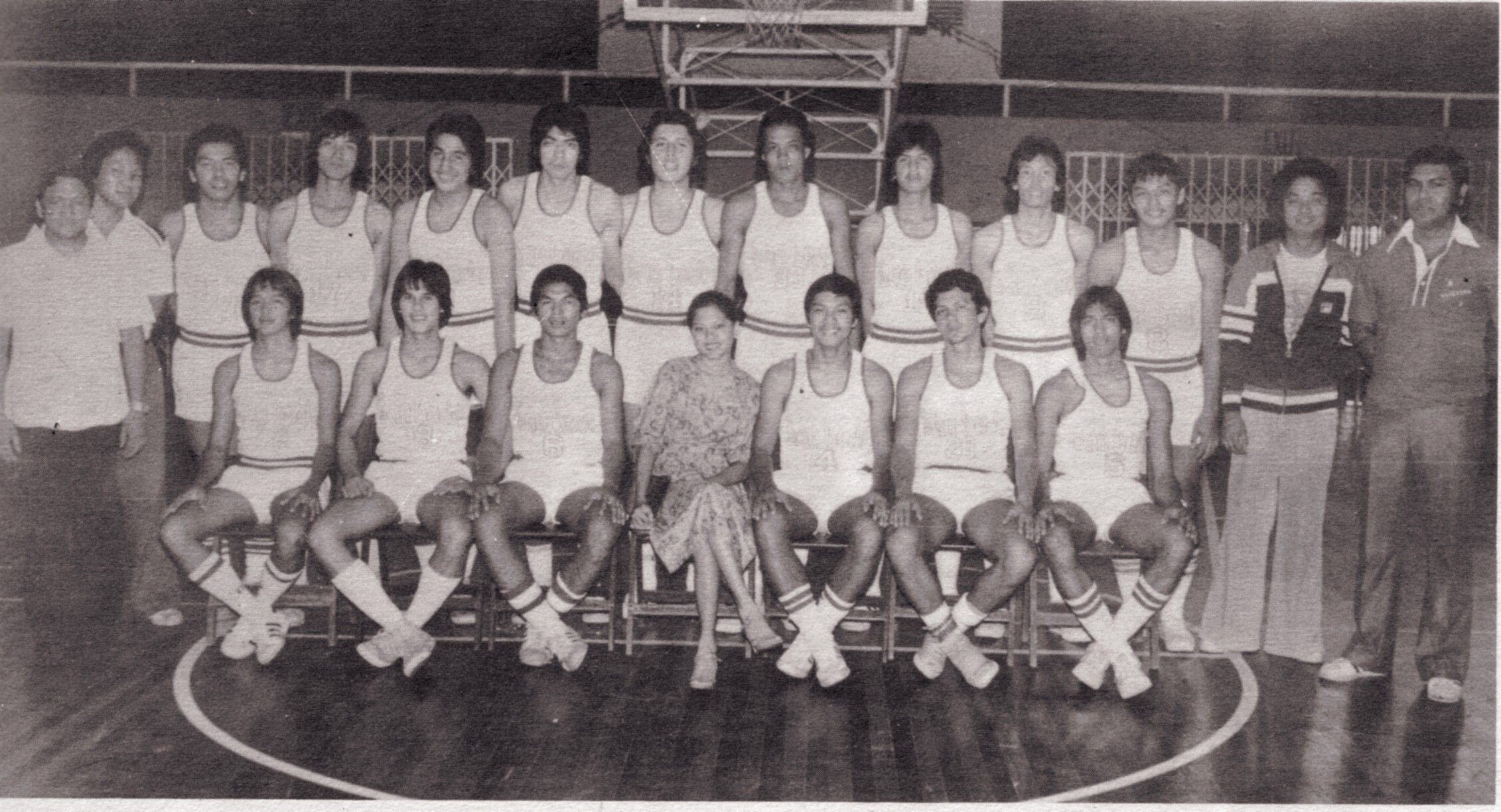
The 1978 San Beda Red Lions, the last NCAA seniors' basketball champions from the school until their 2006 championship

The National Collegiate Athletic Association (Philippines) (NCAA) holds its annual basketball tournaments for the Seniors' and Juniors' divisions from June to October of the academic year. The tournament started in 1924, the NCAA's inaugural year, and has been held continuously since then, only interrupted by World War II from 1942 to 1946, suspension of play from 1961 to 1965 due to the proliferation of ineligible players, and the 1980 riot between supporters of La Salle and Letran which wrecked the Rizal Memorial Coliseum which forced the association to suspend the rest of the season.

For much of the NCAA's history, the team at the top of the standings during the first half of the season faced the team that won the latter half of the season for the championship; in 1960 if a third team had a better cumulative record than either champion, that team played the champion of the latter half of the season to face the champion of the first half for the NCAA championship.

In 1998, the "Final Four" format used in the University Athletic Association of the Philippines (UAAP) was first applied: in a modified Shaughnessy playoff system, the two teams with the best records possess the "twice to beat advantage" in which they only have to win once to advance to the best-of-three finals while their opponents have to win twice. Prior to the introduction of the "Final Four" format, if a team managed to win all of the group stage games (or at least won both halves of the season), the team were named outright champions. At the introduction of the "Final Four" format the unbeaten team had an outright finals berth with the twice to beat advantage while the remaining three teams played in a single-elimination tournament; in 2008, the unbeaten team still qualified outright for the finals but the finals was a best-of-three series. Starting in 2010, the unbeaten team possesses the "thrice to beat" advantage where they only have to win twice while their opponent has to win thrice to win the championship. In 2017, the NCAA reverted to a rule where an unbeaten team still had a bye to the finals but the finals was a best-of-three series and the number 2 team in the stepladder series will not have twice to beat advantage.

== List of champions per year ==
*	Denotes school that won both juniors' and seniors' championship in the same year

=== Early years (1924–1935) ===
The NCAA was founded by the Ateneo de Manila, De La Salle College, the Institute of Accounts (known today as Far Eastern University), National University, San Beda College, the University of Manila, the University of the Philippines and the University of Santo Tomas. Membership was fluid, and the composition of the association changed frequently. To this date, San Beda is the only founding member left in the association.

Season	Academic year	Men's champion	Midgets' champion
0	1924–25	University of the Philippines (1)	Ateneo de Manila (1); De La Salle College (1)
1	1925–26	University of the Philippines* (2)	University of the Philippines (1)^
2	1926–27	University of the Philippines* (3)	University of the Philippines (2)*
3	1927–28	San Beda College (1)	University of the Philippines (3)
4	1928–29	Ateneo de Manila (1)	Colegio de San Juan de Letran (1)
5	1929–30	University of the Philippines (4)	Colegio de San Juan de Letran (2)
6	1930–31	University of Santo Tomas (1)	Colegio de San Juan de Letran (3)

In 1931, the midgets' championship was renamed as the "juniors' championship".

Season	Academic year	Men's champion	Juniors' champion
7	1931–32	Ateneo de Manila* (2)	Ateneo de Manila (2)*; Colegio de San Juan de Letran (4); De La Salle College (2); Institute of Accounts (1) (4-way tie)
8	1932–33	Ateneo de Manila* (3)	Ateneo de Manila* (3)
9	1933–34	Ateneo de Manila* (4)	Ateneo de Manila* (4)
10	1934–35	San Beda College (2)	De La Salle College (3)
11	1935–36	San Beda College (3)	Ateneo de Manila (5); José Rizal College (1); Mapúa Institute of Technology (1) (3-way tie)

=== The old-timer six (1936–68) ===
After National University, University of the Philippines, and University of Santo Tomas left the NCAA in 1932, the Ateneo de Manila, Colegio de San Juan de Letran, De La Salle College, José Rizal College, Mapúa Institute of Technology and San Beda College continued the association and its membership remained unchanged for several decades.

World War II interrupted the NCAA's activities in 1941, but the association resumed operations after the war in 1947.

The Zamora Cup was a trophy disputed within the NCAA after World War II. If was given to the team that wins three seniors championships after the war. San Beda won the cup in 1955.

Season	Academic year	Men's champion	Juniors' champion
12	1936–37	San Beda College (4)	Ateneo de Manila (6)
13	1937–38	Ateneo de Manila* (5)	Ateneo de Manila* (7)
14	1938–39	Colegio de San Juan de Letran (1)	Ateneo de Manila (8)
15	1939–40	De La Salle College* (1)	De La Salle College* (4)
16	1940–41	San Beda College (5)	Mapúa Institute of Technology (2)
17	1941–42	Ateneo de Manila (6)	José Rizal College (2)
18	1942–43	World War II – not held	
19	1943–44	World War II – not held	
20	1944–45	World War II – not held	
21	1945–46	World War II – not held	
22	1946–47	World War II – not held	
23	1947–48	De La Salle College (2)	José Rizal College (3)
24	1948–49	José Rizal College (1)	Colegio de San Juan de Letran (5)
25	1949–50	Mapúa Institute of Technology (1)	José Rizal College (4)
26	1950–51	Colegio de San Juan de Letran (2)	Mapúa Institute of Technology (3)
27	1951–52	San Beda College (6)	De La Salle College (5)
28	1952–53	San Beda College (7)	José Rizal College (5)
29	1953–54	Ateneo de Manila (7)	Mapúa Institute of Technology (4)
30	1954–55	Ateneo de Manila (8)	José Rizal College (6)
31	1955–56	San Beda College (8)	De La Salle College (6)
32	1956–57	De La Salle College (3)	Mapúa Institute of Technology (5)
33	1957–58	Ateneo de Manila (9)	Colegio de San Juan de Letran (6)
34	1958–59	Ateneo de Manila (10)	Mapúa Institute of Technology (6)
35	1959–60	San Beda College (9)	José Rizal College (7)
36	1960–61	Colegio de San Juan de Letran (3)	Mapúa Institute of Technology (7)
37	1961–62	Ateneo de Manila (11)	Mapúa Institute of Technology (8)
38	1962–63	No tournament^{[2]}	
39	1963–64	José Rizal College (2)^{[3]}	Suspended^{[1]}
40	1964–65	José Rizal College (3)^{[3]}	Suspended^{[1]}
41	1965–66	Mapúa Institute of Technology* (2)	Mapúa Institute of Technology* (9)
42	1966–67	Colegio de San Juan de Letran (4)	Ateneo de Manila University (9)
43	1967–68	José Rizal College (4)	San Beda College (1)
44	1968–69	José Rizal College (5)	Mapúa Institute of Technology (10)

=== First expansion (1969–78) ===
San Sebastian College–Recoletos was admitted in 1969, marking the first change in the NCAA's membership since 1936. This increased the association's membership to seven colleges. Trinity College of Quezon City was also admitted in 1974, the association's golden anniversary, according to publications of the day.

Season	Academic year	Men's champion	Juniors' champion
45	1969–70	Ateneo de Manila University (12)	Mapúa Institute of Technology (11)
46	1970–71	Colegio de San Juan de Letran (5)	Mapúa Institute of Technology (12)
47	1971–72	De La Salle College (4)	Mapúa Institute of Technology (13)
48	1972–73	José Rizal College (6)	Mapúa Institute of Technology (14)
49	1973–74	San Sebastian College–Recoletos (1)	Ateneo de Manila University (10)
50	1974–75	De La Salle College (5)	San Beda College (2)
51	1975–76	Ateneo de Manila University (13)	Colegio de San Juan de Letran (7)
52	1976–77	Ateneo de Manila University* (14)	Ateneo de Manila University* (11)
53	1977–78	San Beda College (10)	José Rizal College (8)

=== First contraction (1978–84) ===
The Ateneo de Manila University left the association in 1978 after the championship series against San Beda College where the final game was held behind closed doors. In September 1980, De La Salle University withdrew from the association after an August 17 game against Colegio de San Juan Letran turned into a full-blown riot which led to the game being called off. The association ordered the game to be replayed behind closed doors but the then-FIBA recognized basketball association, the Basketball Association of the Philippines, ordered the association to cancel the rest of the season.

San Beda College left in 1984 to concentrate on intramural events.

Season	Academic year	Men's champion	Juniors' champion
54	1978–79	San Beda College* (11)	San Beda College* (3)
55	1979–80	Colegio de San Juan de Letran* (6)	Colegio de San Juan de Letran* (8)
56	1980–81	No champion – Tournaments aborted by the Basketball Association of the Philippines^{[4]}	
57	1981–82	Mapúa Institute of Technology (3)	San Beda College (4)
58	1982–83	Colegio de San Juan de Letran (7)	San Beda College (5)
59	1983–84	Colegio de San Juan de Letran* (8)	Colegio de San Juan de Letran* (9)

=== Second expansion (1984–95) ===
After the Ateneo de Manila, La Salle, and San Beda left, the NCAA opened its doors to new members. In 1984, Perpetual Help College of Rizal was accepted as a new member, while Trinity College of Quezon City became a full member in 1985, after the Stallions were admitted earlier provisionally, in 1974). San Beda rejoined the association in 1986, while Trinity left in the same year.

Season	Academic year	Men's champion	Juniors' champion
60	1984–85	Colegio de San Juan de Letran (9)	Trinity College of Quezon City (1)
61	1985–86	San Sebastian College–Recoletos (2)	Colegio de San Juan de Letran (10)
62	1986–87	Colegio de San Juan de Letran (10)	San Sebastian College–Recoletos (1)
63	1987–88	Colegio de San Juan de Letran (11)	San Beda College (6)
64	1988–89	San Sebastian College–Recoletos (3)	San Beda College (7)
65	1989–90	San Sebastian College–Recoletos (4)	Mapúa Institute of Technology (15)
66	1990–91	Mapúa Institute of Technology (4)	Colegio de San Juan de Letran (11)
67	1991–92	Mapúa Institute of Technology (5)	San Beda College (8)^{[5]}
68	1992–93	Colegio de San Juan de Letran (12)	San Beda College (9)
69	1993–94	San Sebastian College–Recoletos (5)	Mapúa Institute of Technology (16)
70	1994–95	San Sebastian College–Recoletos (6)	Mapúa Institute of Technology (17)
71	1995–96	San Sebastian College–Recoletos (7)	San Beda College (10)

=== Third expansion (1996–2009) ===
In 1996, Philippine Christian University became the seventh member of the NCAA. Two years later, De La Salle–College of Saint Benilde was admitted as the eighth member.

The Final Four format as used in the UAAP was first applied in 1997.

Season	Academic year	Men's champion	Juniors' champion
72	1996–97	San Sebastian College–Recoletos (8)	San Beda College (11)
73	1997–98	San Sebastian College–Recoletos (9)	Mapúa Institute of Technology (18)
74	1998–99	Colegio de San Juan de Letran (13)	Mapúa Institute of Technology (19)
75	1999–2000	Colegio de San Juan de Letran (14)	San Beda College (12)
76	2000–01	De La Salle–College of Saint Benilde (1)	Mapúa Institute of Technology (20)
77	2001–02	San Sebastian College–Recoletos (10)	Colegio de San Juan de Letran (12)
78	2002–03	San Sebastian College–Recoletos (11)	San Beda College (13)
79	2003–04	Colegio de San Juan de Letran (15)	San Beda College (14)
80	2004–05	Philippine Christian University (1)	San Beda College (15)
81	2005–06	Colegio de San Juan de Letran (16)	San Sebastian College–Recoletos (2)
82	2006–07	San Beda College (12)	San Sebastian College–Recoletos (3)
83	2007–08	San Beda College (13)	San Sebastian College–Recoletos (4)
84	2008–09	San Beda College (14)	San Sebastian College–Recoletos (5)

=== Fourth expansion (2009–present) ===
In 2007, Philippine Christian University (PCU) were found to have ineligible players in its juniors basketball team. The NCAA suspended PCU for the 2007–08 season in all events. By 2008, the NCAA allowed PCU to return for the 2008–09 season, then take an indefinite leave of absence thereafter.

In 2009, Angeles University Foundation (AUF), Arellano University, Emilio Aguinaldo College (EAC) participated as guest members for the 2009–10 season; only Arellano and EAC were accepted as members on probation starting on the 2010–11 season. In 2011, Lyceum of the Philippines University was invited as a guest team that would play on the 2011–12 season. Arellano was elevated to regular membership after all the association requirements were met. EAC and Lyceum remained on probation; their status and performances were evaluated at the end of the 2014–15 season. Weeks before the start of NCAA Season 91, EAC and Lyceum were elevated to regular membership.

Starting in NCAA Season 98, juniors' championship was held separately with the men's championship, with the former being held on the second semester of the academic year, while the latter on the first semester. This means, for NCAA Season 98, the men's championship was held in 2022, while the juniors' championship was held in 2023.

Season	Academic year	Men's champion	Juniors' champion
85	2009–10	San Sebastian College–Recoletos (12)	San Beda College–Rizal (16)
86	2010–11	San Beda College* (15)	San Beda College–Rizal* (17)
87	2011–12	San Beda College* (16)	San Beda College–Rizal* (18)
88	2012–13	San Beda College* (17)	San Beda College–Rizal* (19)
89	2013–14	San Beda College* (18)	San Beda College–Rizal* (20)
90	2014–15	San Beda College* (19)	San Beda College–Rizal* (21)
91	2015–16	Colegio de San Juan de Letran (17)	San Beda College–Rizal (22)
92	2016–17	San Beda College (20)	Malayan High School of Science (1)
93	2017–18	San Beda College (21)	La Salle Green Hills (1)
94	2018–19	San Beda University (22)	Malayan High School of Science (2)
95	2019–20	Colegio de San Juan de Letran (18)	San Beda University–Rizal (23)
96	2020–21	Not held – Canceled due to the COVID-19 pandemic in Metro Manila	
97	2021–22	Colegio de San Juan de Letran (19)	Not held – Canceled due to the condensed season
98	2022–23	Colegio de San Juan de Letran* (20)	Colegio de San Juan de Letran* (13)

To foster grassroots talent, the NCAA added a kiddies division to its basketball roster starting Season 99.

Season	Academic year	Men's champion	Juniors' champion	Kiddies' champion
99	2023–24	San Beda University (23)	Colegio de San Juan de Letran (14)	Arellano University (1)
100	2024–25	Mapúa University (6)	University of Perpetual Help System DALTA (1)	EAC–Immaculate Conception Academy (1)
101	2025–26	San Beda University (24)	Colegio de San Juan de Letran (15)	EAC–Immaculate Conception Academy (2)
102	2026–27			

== List of championships per school ==
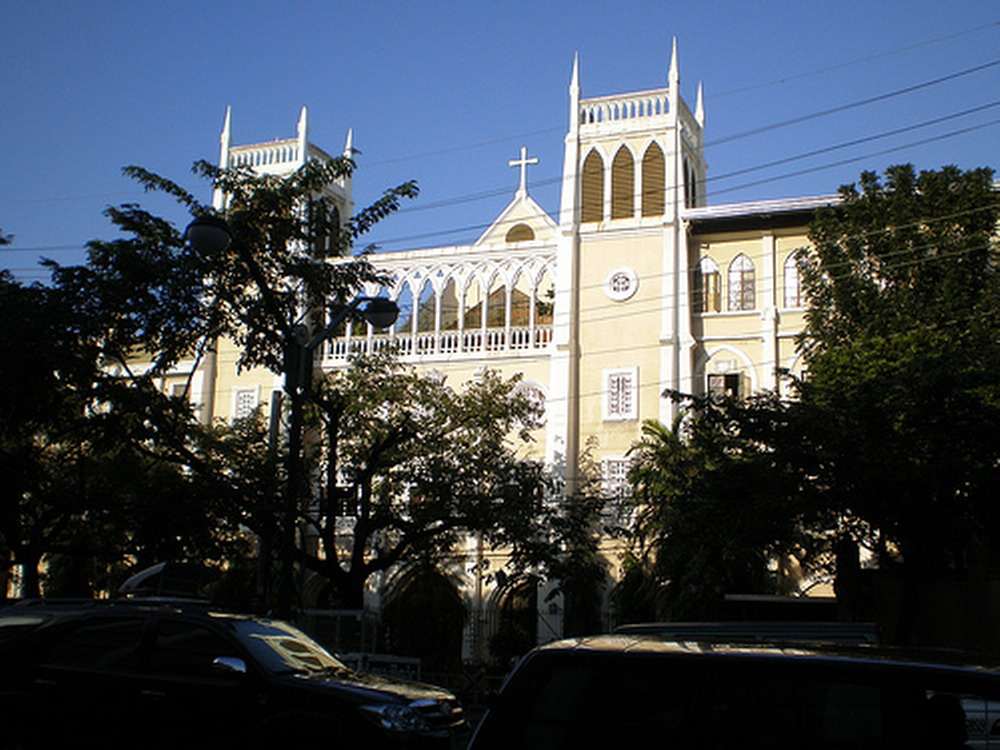
San Beda has won a total of 47 NCAA basketball championships, the most in the history of the association, and is the only remaining founding member. The institution currently holds the record for the most championships in both divisions, with 23 titles in the juniors’ division and 24 in the seniors’ division. Its juniors’ team also holds the record for the longest championship streak in the association, with seven consecutive titles. In addition, San Beda is the reigning champion in the seniors’ tournament.

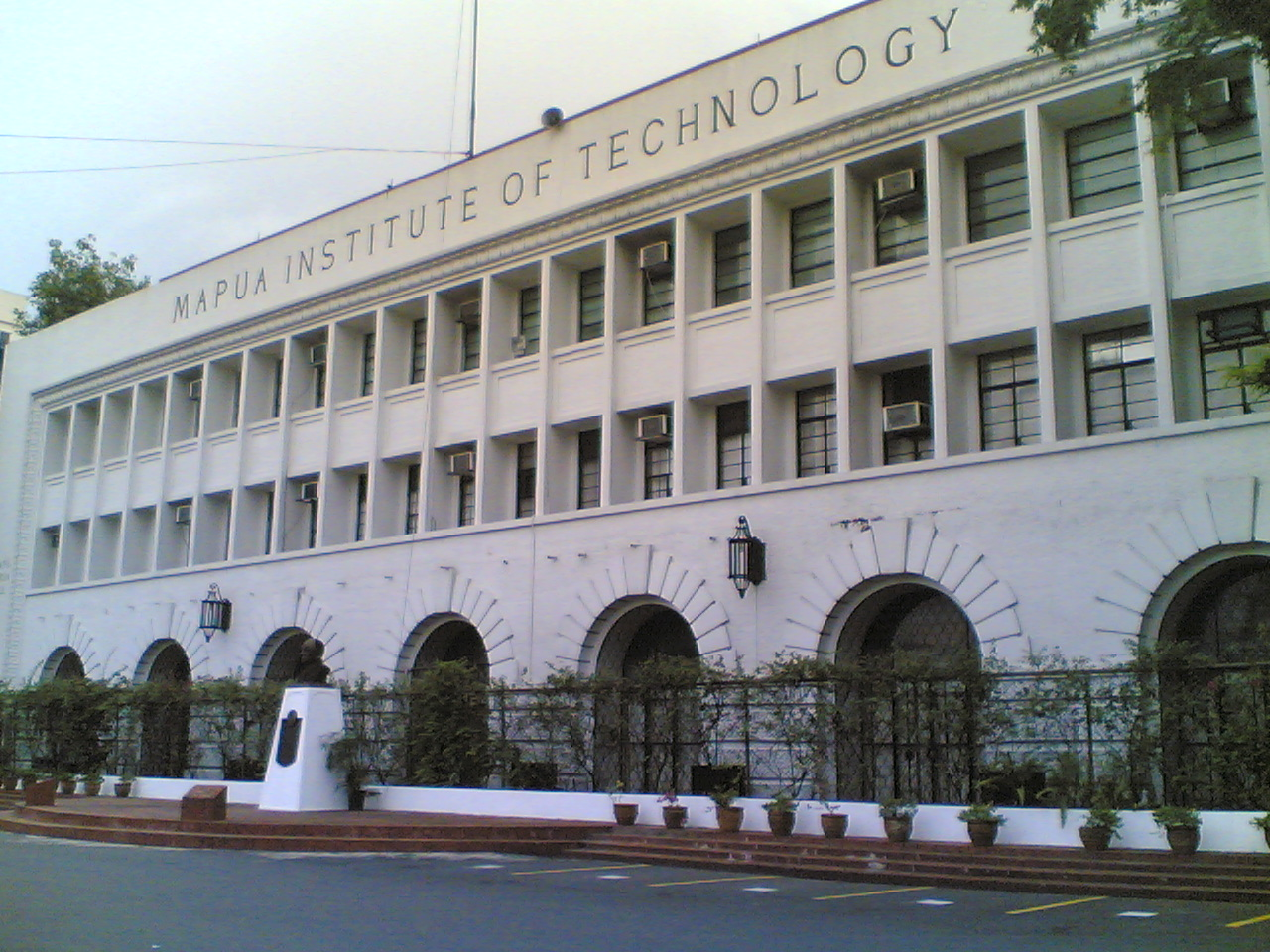
Mapúa held an association-best total of 21 juniors’ championships, including one shared title, until 2015, when San Beda captured its 22nd juniors’ championship and subsequently assumed the record for the most titles, a distinction it continues to hold to this day. Mapúa High School closed in 2005, and the Malayan High School of Science now represents Mapúa in the juniors’ tournament, having secured two championships for the institution.

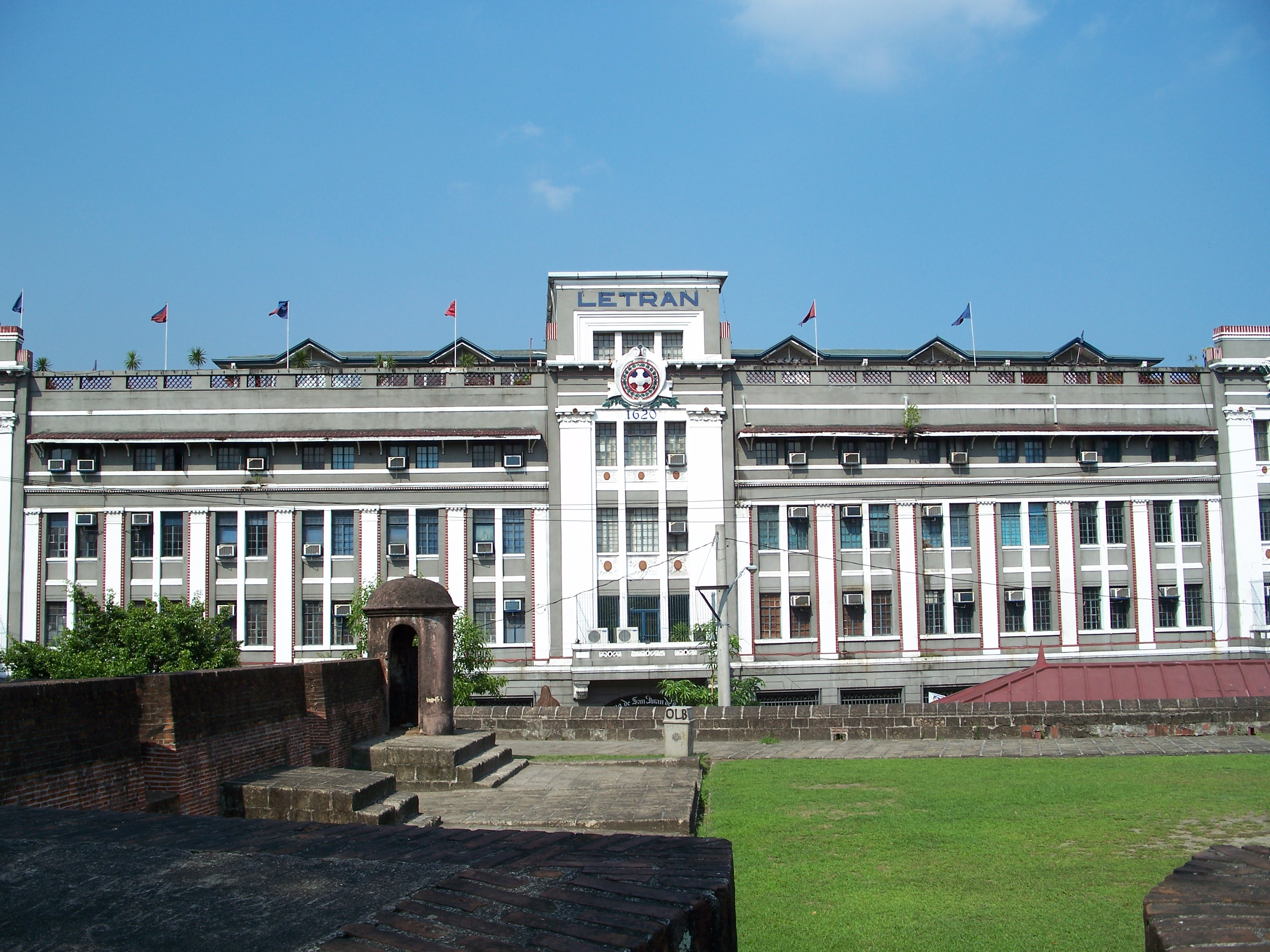
Letran held the record for the most NCAA seniors’ championships with 16 titles until 2011, when San Beda won its 16th seniors’ championship and tied Letran’s mark. San Beda subsequently went on to hold the record for the most championships, a distinction it maintains to the present, while Letran currently has a total of 20 seniors titles. Furthermore, Letran currently holds the title of reigning champion in the juniors’ tournament.

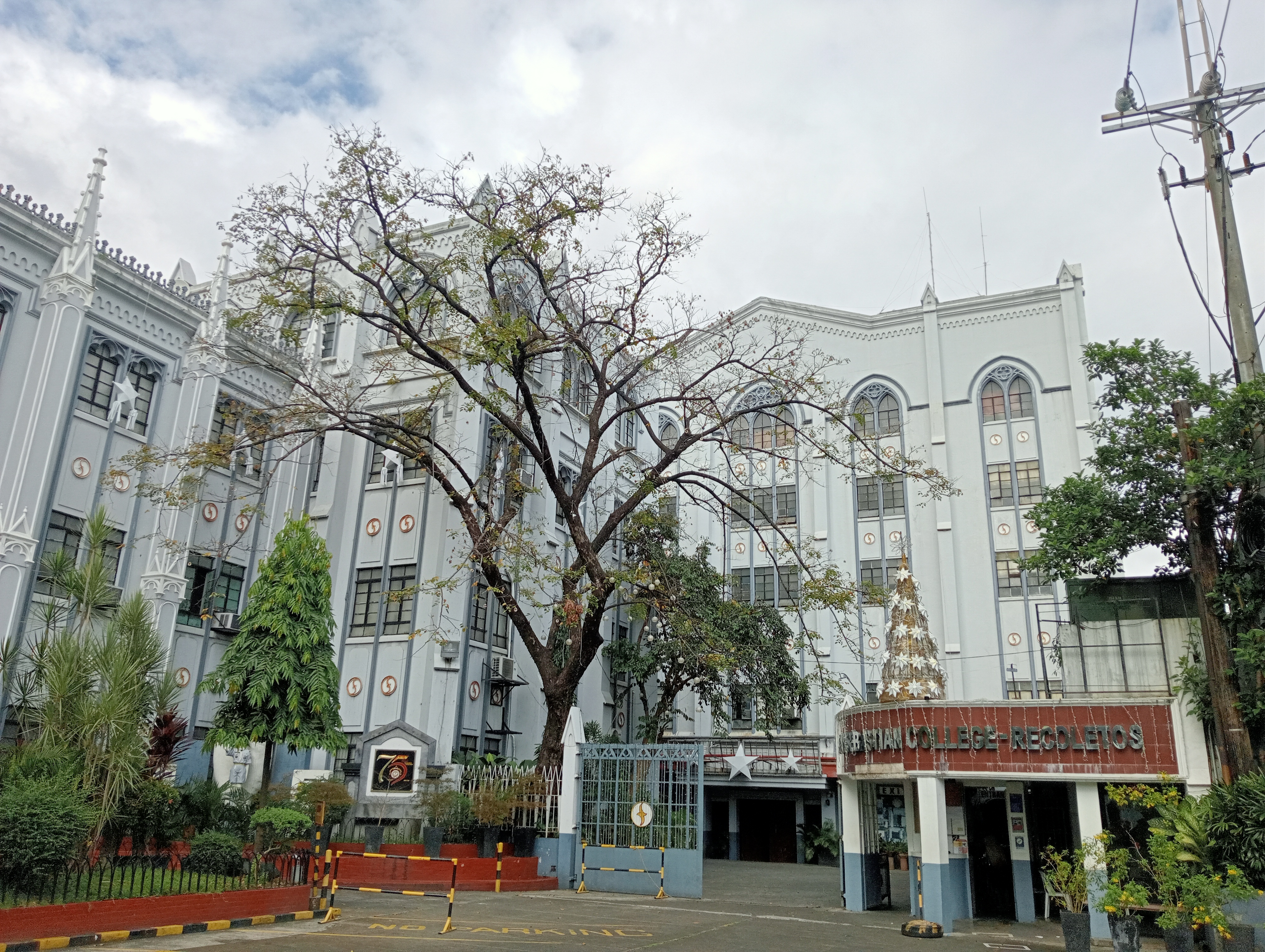
San Sebastian seniors' team held the record for the longest championship run in the association, securing five consecutive titles from 1993 to 1997. This record stood until 2014, when San Beda achieved its own five-peat. Consequently, both institutions share the league record for the longest championship streak in the seniors division, with five consecutive titles each.

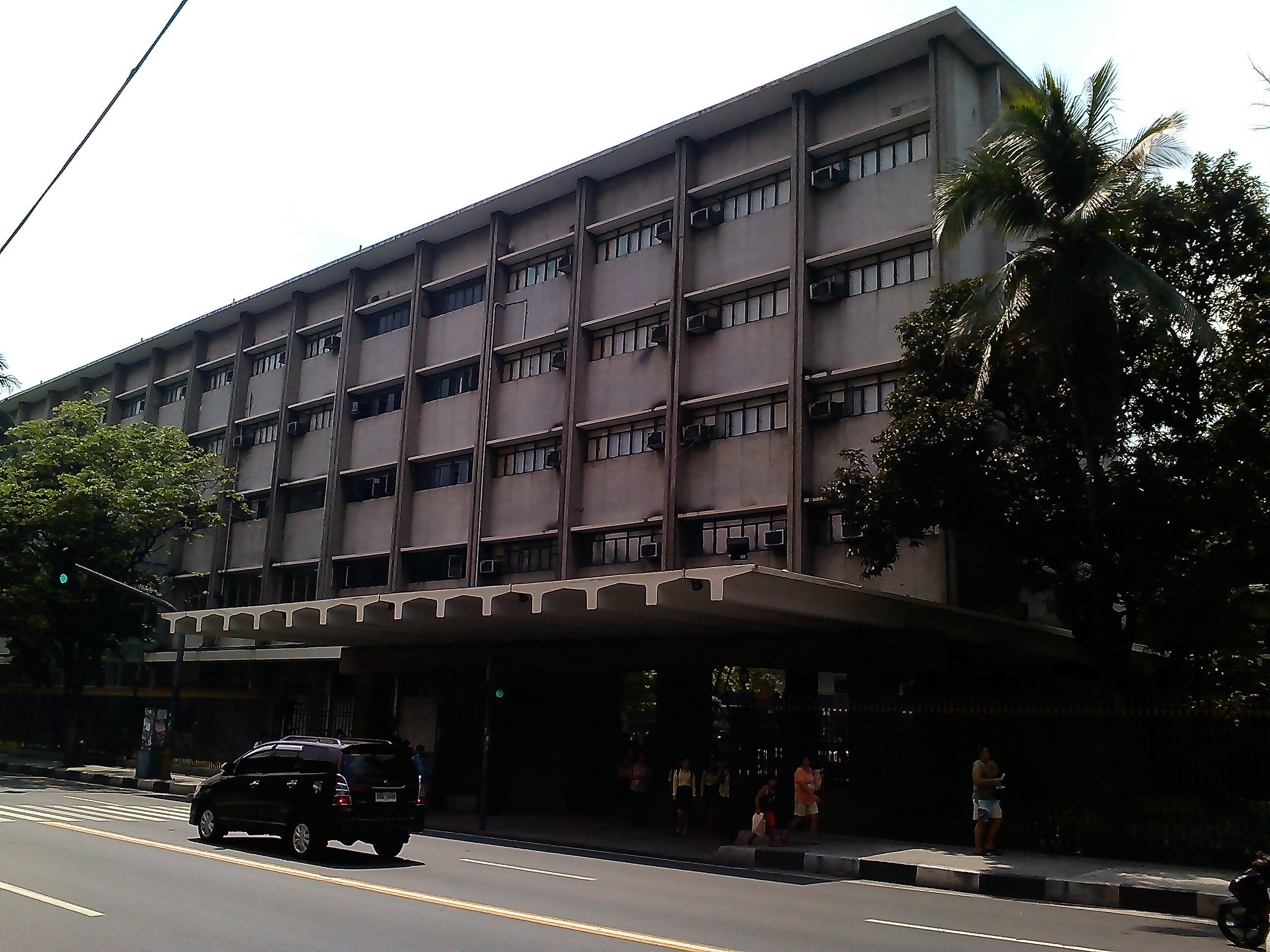
JRU holds the longest championship droughts in NCAA history in both divisions, with the seniors’ team enduring a 54-year title drought since 1972 and the juniors’ team a 49-year drought since 1977.

Perpetual won its first NCAA juniors' championship in 2025.

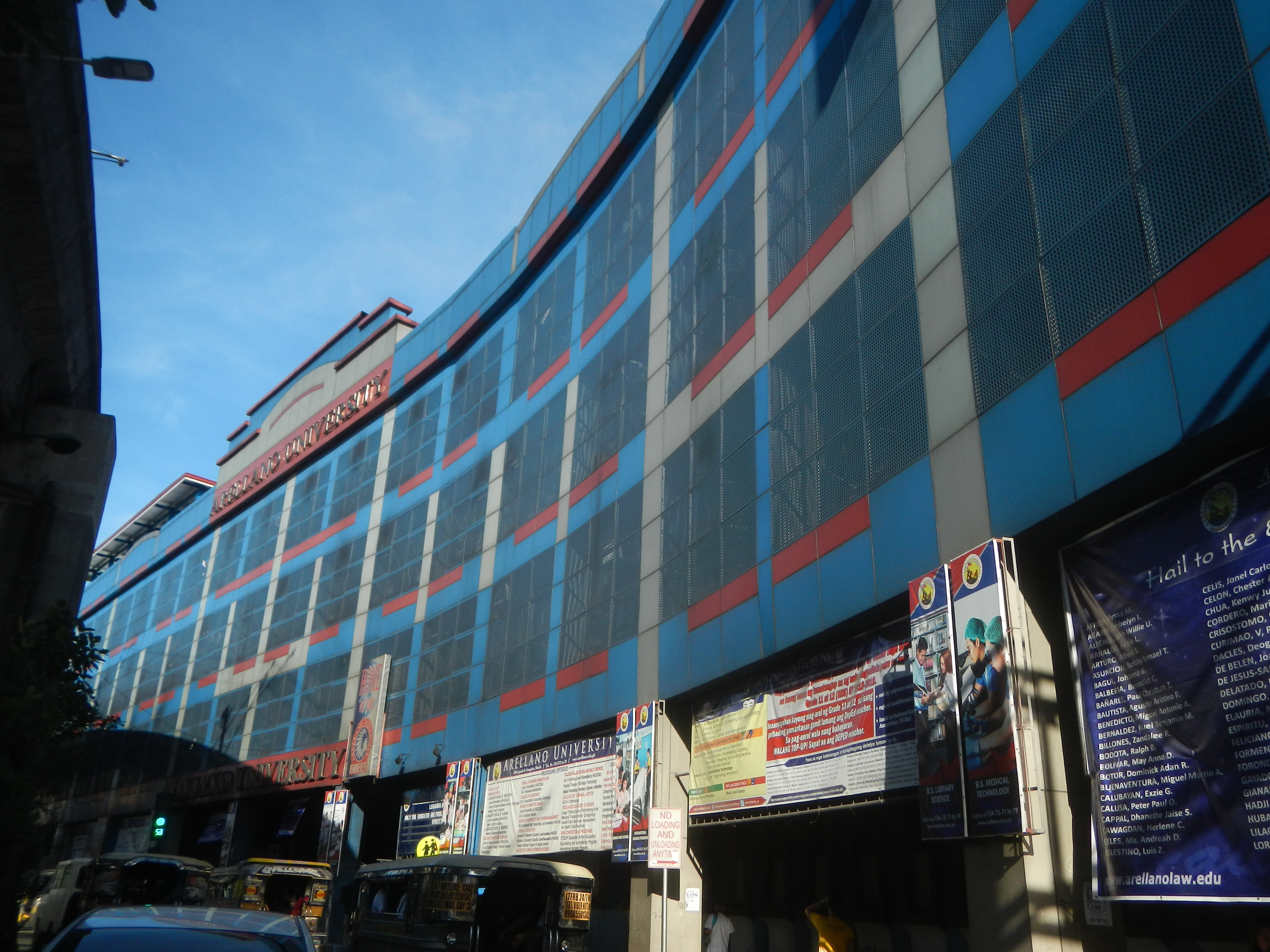
Arellano won the inaugural kiddies' basketball tournament in season 99.

EAC claimed back-to-back kiddies' division championships in seasons 100 and 101.

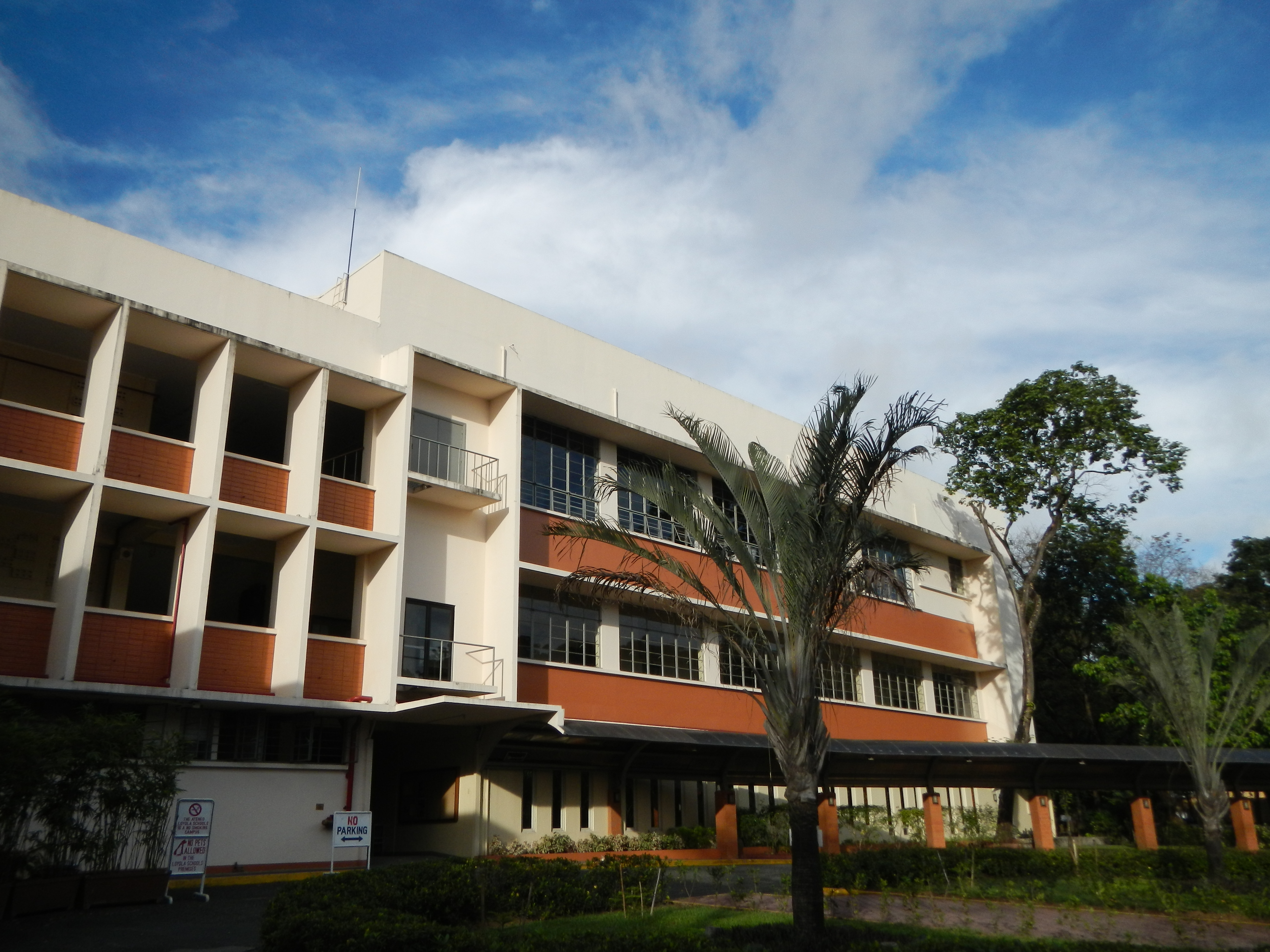
Ateneo de Manila won 14 NCAA Seniors basketball championships before leaving the NCAA in 1978. Up to 2003, the Ateneo had the most number of NCAA seniors' basketball championships.

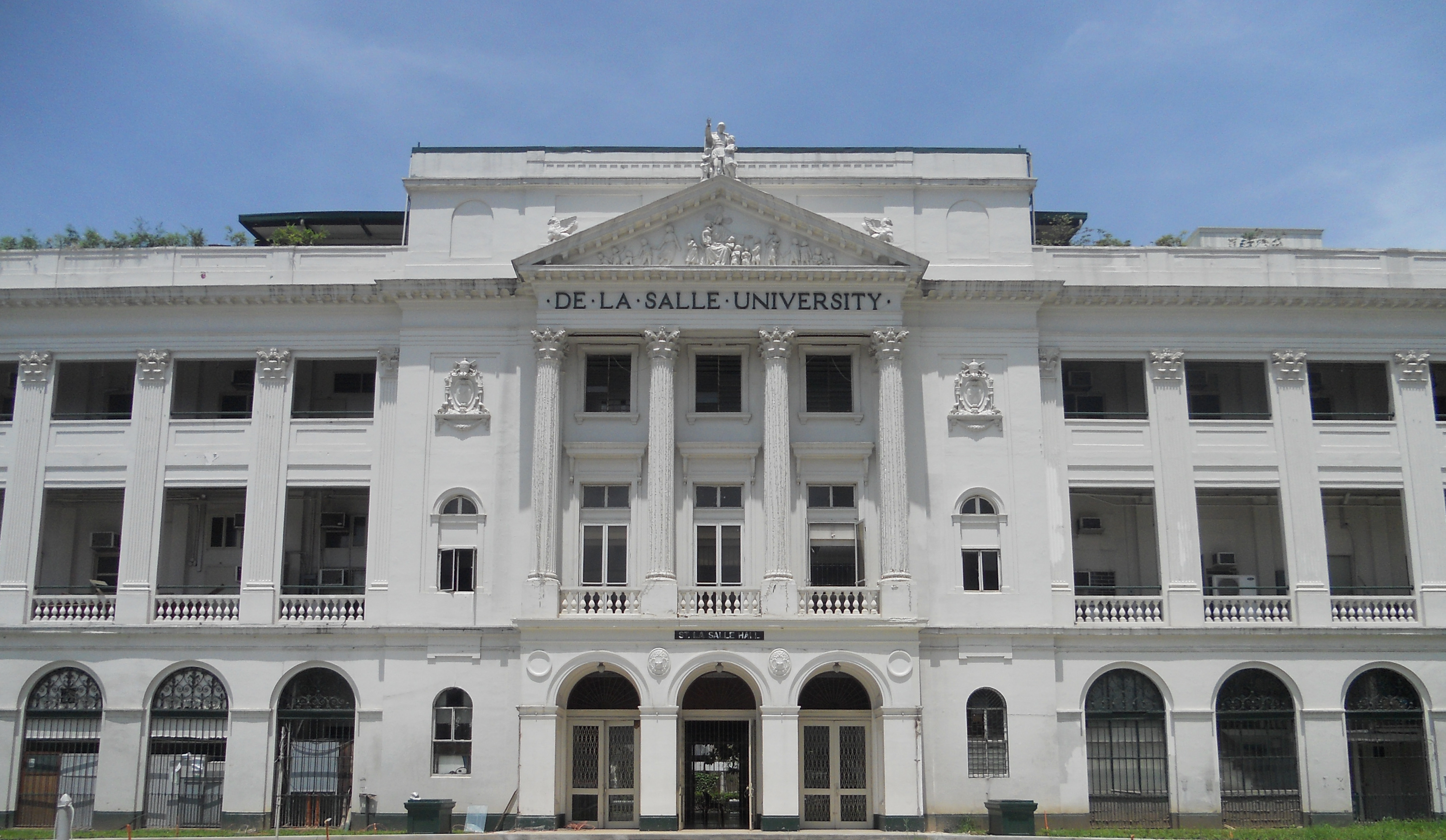
De La Salle won the first juniors' championship.

School	Seniors'	Juniors'		Total	Last championship		
School	M	B	K	Total	M	B	K
San Beda University	24	23	0	47	2025–26	2019–20	Never
Colegio de San Juan de Letran	20	15^{[11]}	0	35	2022–23	2025–26	Never
Mapúa University	6	20^{[11]}	0	26	2024–25	2000–01	Never
Ateneo de Manila University^{[6]}	14	11^{[7]}	0	25	1976–77	1976–77	Never
San Sebastian College–Recoletos	12	5	0	17	2009–10	2008–09	Never
José Rizal University^{[3]}	6	8^{[11]}	0	14	1972–73	1977–78	Never
De La Salle University^{[6]}	5	6^{[11]}	0	11	1974–75	1955–56	Never
University of the Philippines^{[6]}	4	3	0	7	1929–30	1927–28	Never
Malayan High School of Science	–^{[10]}	2	0	2	–^{[10]}	2018–19	Never
Emilio Aguinaldo College	0	0	2	2	Never	Never	2025–26
University of Santo Tomas^{[6]}	1	0	0	1	1930–31	Never	Never
Philippine Christian University^{[6]}	1	0	0	1	2004–05	Never	Never
De La Salle–College of Saint Benilde	1	–^{[8]}		1	2000–01	–^{[8]}	
Trinity College of Quezon City^{[6]}	0	1	0	1	Never	1984–85	Never
La Salle Green Hills	–^{[9]}	1	0	1	–^{[9]}	2017–18	Never
Far Eastern University^{[6]}	0	1	0	1	Never	1931–32^{[11]}	Never
University of Perpetual Help System DALTA	0	1	0	1	Never	2024–25	Never
Arellano University	0	0	1	1	Never	Never	2023–24
Lyceum of the Philippines University	0	0	0	0	Never	Never	Never

== Championship streaks ==
^{†}	Ongoing streak

No.	Division	School	Seasons
7	Juniors	San Beda College	2009–10 to 2015–16
5	Seniors	San Sebastian College–Recoletos	1993–94 to 1997–98
5	Seniors	San Beda College	2010–11 to 2014–15
5	Juniors	Mapúa Institute of Technology	1968–69 to 1972–73
4	Juniors	San Sebastian College–Recoletos	2005–06 to 2008–09
4	Juniors	Ateneo de Manila	1935–36^{[10]} to 1938–39
4	Juniors	Colegio de San Juan de Letran	1928–29 to 1931–32^{[10]}
3	Seniors	Colegio de San Juan de Letran	2019–20 to 2022–23
3	Seniors	San Beda University	2016–17 to 2018–19
3	Seniors	San Beda College	2006–07 to 2008–09
3	Juniors	San Beda College	2002–03 to 2004–05
3	Seniors	Colegio de San Juan de Letran	1982–83 to 1984–85
3	Seniors	San Beda College	1934–35 to 1936–37
3	Seniors	Ateneo de Manila	1931–32 to 1933–34
3	Juniors	Ateneo de Manila	1931–32^{[10]} to 1933–34
3	Juniors	University of the Philippines	1925–26 to 1927–28
3	Seniors	University of the Philippines	1924–25 to 1926–27
2	Juniors	Colegio de San Juan de Letran	2022–23 to 2023–24
2	Seniors	San Sebastian College–Recoletos	2001–02 to 2002–03
2	Seniors	Colegio de San Juan de Letran	1998–99 to 1999–2000
2	Juniors	Mapúa Institute of Technology	1997–98 to 1998–99
2	Juniors	San Beda College	1995–96 to 1996–97
2	Juniors	Mapúa Institute of Technology	1993–94 to 1994–95
2	Juniors	San Beda College	1991–92 to 1992–93
2	Seniors	Mapúa Institute of Technology	1990–91 to 1991–92
2	Seniors	San Sebastian College–Recoletos	1988–89 to 1989–90
2	Juniors	San Beda College	1987–88 to 1988–89
2	Seniors	Colegio de San Juan de Letran	1986–87 to 1987–88
2	Juniors	San Beda College	1981–82 to 1982–83
2	Seniors	San Beda College	1977–78 to 1978–79
2	Seniors	Ateneo de Manila University	1975–76 to 1976–77
2	Juniors	Ateneo de Manila University	1975–76 to 1976–77
2	Seniors	José Rizal College	1967–68 to 1968–69
2	Seniors	José Rizal College	1963–64 to 1964–65
2	Juniors	Mapúa Institute of Technology	1960–61 to 1961–62
2	Seniors	Ateneo de Manila	1957–58 to 1958–59
2	Seniors	Ateneo de Manila	1953–54 to 1954–55
2	Seniors	San Beda College	1951–52 to 1952–53
2	Seniors	Ateneo de Manila	1931–32 to 1932–33

== Statistics ==
=== Longest finals appearances ===
Division	Team	Duration	
Division	Team	from	until
Juniors'	San Beda University–Rizal	Season 85 (2009)	Season 92 (2015)
Men's	San Beda University	Season 82 (2006)	Season 95 (2019)

=== Longest finals match-ups between two teams ===
Division	Teams	Duration	
Division	Teams	from	until
Juniors'			
Men's	San Beda University vs. San Sebastian College–Recoletos	Season 85 (2009)	Season 87 (2011)

=== Longest championship streaks ===
Division	Team	Streak	Duration	
Division	Team	Streak	from	until
Juniors'	San Beda University–Rizal	7	Season 85 (2009)	Season 91 (2015)
Men's	San Beda University	5	Season 86 (2010)	Season 90 (2015)
Men's	San Sebastian College–Recoletos	5	Season 69 (1993)	Season 73 (1997)

=== Longest championship droughts ===
Team	Juniors'	Men's
Arellano University	17 years, since 2009	17 years, since 2009
Colegio de San Juan de Letran	1 year, since 2025	4 years, since 2022
De La Salle–College of Saint Benilde	9 years, since 2017	26 years, since 2000
Emilio Aguinaldo College	17 years, since 2009	17 years, since 2009
José Rizal University	49 years, since 1977	54 years, since 1972
Lyceum of the Philippines University	15 years, since 2011	15 years, since 2011
Mapúa University	8 years, since 2018	2 year, since 2024
San Beda University	7 years, since 2019	1 year, since 2025
San Sebastian College–Recoletos	18 years, since 2008	17 years, since 2009
University of Perpetual Help System DALTA	1 year, since 2025	42 years, since 1984

=== Elimination sweeps ===
Division	Team	Season(s)	Pld	Total
Juniors'	San Beda University–Rizal	Season 87 (2011)	18	3
Juniors'	San Beda University–Rizal	Season 89 (2013)	18	3
Juniors'	San Beda University–Rizal	Season 91 (2015)	18	3
Juniors'	San Sebastian College–Recoletos	Season 84 (2008)	12	1
Men's	San Sebastian College–Recoletos	Season 64 (1988)	10	3
Men's	San Sebastian College–Recoletos	Season 70 (1994)	10	3
Men's	San Sebastian College–Recoletos	Season 73 (1997)	12	3
Men's	San Beda University	Season 86 (2010)	16	2
Men's	San Beda University	Season 95 (2019)	18	2
Men's	Colegio de San Juan de Letran	Season 60 (1984)	8	2
Men's	Colegio de San Juan de Letran	Season 97 (2021)^{a}	9	2
Men's	Lyceum of the Philippines University	Season 93 (2017)	18	1

Notes:

a.The traditional Final Four format was used instead of the stepladder format due to round robin tournament. 2021–22 season was played in early 2022.

== Notes ==
1. ^{a} ^{b} ^{c} The Juniors tournament was suspended from 1962 to 1965 by the NCAA Board of Control when it was revealed that several schools fielded ineligible players.
2. ^{a} Suspended by the NCAA due to hooliganism and proliferation of ineligible players
3. ^{a} ^{b} ^{c} Seniors championships awarded in the 1963–64 and 1964–65 seasons were later ruled as unofficial by the NCAA.
4. ^{a} Tournaments aborted by the Basketball Association of the Philippines
5. ^{a} Colegio de San Juan de Letran returned the Juniors trophy after a player was found to be ineligible.
6. ^{a} ^{b} ^{c} ^{d} ^{e} ^{f} Denotes schools no longer in the association
7. ^{a} Includes one midgets' division championship. Ateneo had shared junior's championships in the 1931–32 and 1935–36 seasons.
8. ^{a} ^{b} De La Salle–College of Saint Benilde, a college without pre-college education units, does not field a juniors' (high school) team. La Salle Green Hills fields seniors' teams on behalf of De La Salle–College of Saint Benilde.
9. ^{a} ^{b} La Salle Green Hills, a K-12 school, does not field a seniors' (collegiate) team. De La Salle–College of Saint Benilde fields seniors' teams on behalf of La Salle Green Hills.
10. ^{a} ^{b} Malayan High School of Science, a secondary educational institution, does not field a seniors' (collegiate) team. Mapua Institute of Technology fields seniors' teams on behalf of Malayan High School of Science.
11. ^{a} ^{b} ^{c} ^{d} ^{e} ^{f} ^{g} Shared juniors' championship in a given season.

== See also ==
- UAAP Basketball Championship
