= Nani Epondulan =

Filipino basketball coach

JRU Heavy Bombers
- Position: Head coach
- League: NCAA

Personal information
- Born: February 20, 1979 (age 47)

Career information
- College: JRU
- Coaching career: 2004–present

Career history

Playing
- 2002: Cagayan de Oro Amigos
- 2003: MayniLA
- 2005: Far Eastern Insurers
- 2006: Spring Cooking Oil Masters

Coaching
- 2009–2019: Malayan HS (assistant)
- 2016–2019: CEU (assistant)
- 2018–2025: San Juan Knights (assistant)
- 2019–2025: Mapúa (assistant)
- 2025–present: JRU

Career highlights
- As player: NCAA men's MVP (2001); As assistant coach: NCAA men's champion (2025)

Ernani "Nani" Epondulan is a former collegiate basketball player who currently serves as head coach of the JRU Heavy Bombers since 2024.

== Career ==
=== Playing ===
Epondulan played for JRU Heavy Bombers and led the team into a finals appearance in 2001, but lost to San Sebastian Stags. At that time, he also won the Season MVP.

After his stint with JRU, he played for the Cagayan de Oro Amigos in the Metropolitan Basketball Association, MayniLA in the National Basketball Conference, for Far Eastern Insurance in the Philippine Basketball League, and Spring Cooking Oil in the Mindanao Visayas Basketball Association.

He later applied for 2003 PBA draft, but later withdraw his application.

=== Coaching ===
He notably worked as Randy Alcantara's assistant coach on the teams such as Cafe France, CEU Scorpions, and the San Juan Knights. He also worked with him in Mapúa Cardinals where they won a championship in 2024.

In 2025, he was appointed as JRU's head coach, leading the team into a playoff appearance.

== Personal life ==
Epondulan's father, Estelito, was also an NCAA MVP for then JRC Heavy Bombers in 1990.

== Coaching record ==
=== Collegiate ===
Season	Team	Elimination round					Playoffs				
Season	Team	Finish	GP	W	L	PCT	GP	W	L	PCT	Results
2025	JRU	4th/5	13	6	7	.462	2	1	1	.500	Quarterfinals
JRU totals			13	6	7	.462	2	1	1	.500	0 championships
Totals			13	6	7	.366	2	1	1	.500	0 championships
