= List of NCAA basketball champions =

List of NCAA basketball champions may refer to:

- List of NCAA Division I men's basketball champions
- List of NCAA Division I women's basketball champions
- List of NCAA Philippines basketball champions

== See also ==
- NCAA basketball tournament (disambiguation)
