= NCAA Division I basketball tournament =

NCAA Division I basketball tournament or NCAA Division I basketball championship may refer to:

- NCAA Division I men's basketball tournament
- NCAA Division I women's basketball tournament

== See also ==
- NCAA basketball tournament (disambiguation)
- NCAA Final Four (Philippines)
