= Regionals =

Regionals may refer to:

- Figure skating competition
- NCAA basketball tournament
- NCAA Division I Baseball Championship
- "Journey" (Glee)
