= NCAA Season 87 =

- Host school: University of Perpetual Help
- Tagline: "Brazen @ 87"

General
- Seniors: San Beda Red Lions
- Juniors: San Sebastian Staglets

Seniors' champions
Sport		Men	Women
Basketball		San Beda	N/A
Volleyball		Perpetual	Perpetual
Chess		Benilde	
Taekwondo		San Beda	Benilde
Table Tennis		San Beda	Benilde
Lawn Tennis		Letran	
Swimming		San Beda	San Beda (DS)
Beach Volleyball		Arellano	Perpetual
Track and field		JRU	N/A
- Cheerdance: Perpetual (Ex - Coed)

Juniors' champions
Sport		Boys	Girls
Basketball		San Beda	N/A
Volleyball		EAC–ICA	
Chess		San Sebastian	
Taekwondo		LSGH	
Table Tennis		San Beda	
Lawn Tennis		Letran	
Swimming		LSGH	
Beach Volleyball		EAC–ICA	
Track and field		San Sebastian	
- (NT) = No tournament; (DS) = Demonstration Sport; (Ex) = Exhibition;

NCAA Season 87 is the 2011–12 season of the National Collegiate Athletic Association (NCAA) of the Philippines. The host school, University of Perpetual Help System DALTA (UPHSD), led the opening ceremonies at the Araneta Coliseum on July 2, 2011. The men's basketball and the women's volleyball tournaments will be aired by ABS-CBN and Studio 23 for the tenth consecutive season, while the men's basketball events will be simulcast on DZRJ-AM.

== Preseason ==
The Lyceum of the Philippines University became the tenth NCAA team after the league accepted Lyceum as a guest team for the 87 season. Management Committee (MANCOM) chair Mike del Mundo announced that Lyceum completed all of the necessary requirements, including the existence of a high school department. The nonexistence of a high school department two years ago prevented Lyceum from being a guest team; its high school campus in Cavite was accepted and the Lyceum Pirates will field in teams in the mandatory sports. Lyceum paid the league 1.5 million pesos to play in the basketball event, and additional P500,000 bond, as they will have to pay additional fees to play in other events. The Pirates, as a guest team, are eligible to win the championship. Del Mundo also announced the elevation of cheerleading as a regular sport.

Due to the number of competing schools, two days were set aside for the eligibility meeting to ensure no eligibility issues this season.

Boxing's eight-division world champion and Sarangani representative Manny Pacquiao was the keynote speaker during the opening ceremonies on July 2.

== Basketball ==
=== Seniors' tournament ===
==== Elimination round ====
Pos	Team	W	L	PCT	GB	Qualification
1	San Beda Red Lions	16	2	.889 (Note: First-seed playoff: San Beda 88–85 San Sebastian)	—	Twice-to-beat in the semifinals
2	San Sebastian Stags	16	2	.889	—	Twice-to-beat in the semifinals
3	Letran Knights	14	4	.778	2	Twice-to-win in the semifinals
4	JRU Heavy Bombers	9	9	.500	7	Twice-to-win in the semifinals
5	Mapúa Cardinals	7	11	.389 (Note: Head-to-head record: Mapúa 1–1 Lyceum (Mapúa +18))	9	
6	Lyceum Pirates (G)	7	11	.389	9	
7	Arellano Chiefs (X)	6	12	.333 (Note: Head-to-head record: Arellano 1–1 Benilde (Arellano +2))	10	
8	Benilde Blazers	6	12	.333	10	
9	Perpetual Altas (H)	5	13	.278	11	
10	EAC Generals (X)	4	14	.222	12	

Source: ABS-CBN Sports
Rules for classification: 1) winning percentage; 2) if tied for top 4, one-game playoff; 3) head-to-head record; 4) overall point differential
(G) Guests; (H) Hosts; (X) Under probation

==== Bracket ====
Semifinals (Nos. 1 & 2 have twice-to-beat advantage)
1	San Beda	83
4	JRU	74
2	San Sebastian	62	63
3	Letran	70	56

Finals (Best-of-three series)
1	San Beda	75	57
2	San Sebastian	63	55

==== Awards ====
- Most Valuable Player: Calvin Abueva, San Sebastian College-Recoletos
- Rookie of the Year: Josan Nîmes, Mapua Institute of Technology

=== Juniors' tournament ===
==== Team standings ====
Pos	Team	W	L	PCT	GB	Qualification
1	San Beda Red Cubs	18	0	1.000	—	Thrice-to-beat in the Finals (Note: As San Beda won all of their elimination round games, the stepladder format will be used instead of the regular Final Four format.)
2	Letran Squires	14	4	.778	4	Proceed to stepladder round 2
3	La Salle Green Hills Greenies	13	5	.722	5	Proceed to stepladder round 1
4	EAC–ICA Brigadiers (X)	12	6	.667	6	Proceed to stepladder round 1
5	Mapúa Red Robins	10	8	.556	8	
6	San Sebastian Staglets	8	10	.444 (Note: Head-to-head record: San Sebastian 2–0 Arellano)	10	
7	Arellano Braves (X)	8	10	.444	10	
8	JRU Light Bombers	5	13	.278	13	
9	Perpetual Junior Altas (H)	2	16	.111	16	
10	Lyceum Junior Pirates (G)	0	18	.000	18	

Source: ABS-CBN Sports
Rules for classification: 1) winning percentage; 2) if tied for top 4, one-game playoff; 3) head-to-head record; 4) overall point differential
(G) Guests; (H) Hosts; (X) Under probation

==== Bracket ====
First Round; Knockout game
3	LSGH	88
4	EAC–ICA	74

Semifinal; Knockout game
2	Letran	91
3	LSGH	101

Finals; Best-of-5 series with the #1 seed having a 1–0 lead
1	San Beda	82	74	69
3	LSGH	85	73	61

==== Awards ====
- Most Valuable Player: Rey Nambatac, Colegio de San Juan de Letran
- Rookie of the Year: Lugie Cuyos, Emilio Aguinaldo College-Immaculate Concepcion Academy

== Volleyball ==
The volleyball tournaments held its opening ceremonies last November 23 at the Ninoy Aquino Stadium. Selected games are held at San Beda Gym, Lyceum Gym and Letran Gym.

=== Women's tournament ===
The game between San Sebastian and UPHSD, held in San Beda Gym, was conceded after a brawl between the basketball team of San Beda and the volleyball team of San Sebastian.

==== Elimination round ====
Team	W	L	PCT
Perpetual Lady Altas	9	0	1.000
EAC Lady Generals	6	3	.667
Letran Lady Knights	6	3	.667
San Sebastian Lady Stags	6	3	.667
Lyceum Lady Pirates	5	4	.556
**San Beda Red Lionesses**	5	4	.556
Arellano Lady Chiefs	4	5	.444
Benilde Lady Blazers	3	6	.333
JRU Lady Bombers	1	8	.111
Mapúa Lady Cardinals	0	9	.000

Season host is boldfaced.

Qualified to the semifinals

Teams
Teams	1	2	3	4	5	6	7	8	9
AU	Mapua school colors	SSC-R school colors	JRU school colors	EAC school colors	CSB school colors	San Beda school colors	Lyceum school colors	Letran school colors	UPHD school colors
CSJL	JRU school colors	EAC school colors	CSB school colors	Lyceum school colors	San Beda school colors	UPHD school colors	Mapua school colors	SSC-R school colors	Arellano school colors
Benilde	EAC school colors	Lyceum school colors	Letran school colors	San Beda school colors	Arellano school colors	UPHD school colors	SSC-R school colors	Mapua school colors	JRU school colors
EAC	CSB school colors	Letran school colors	San Beda school colors	Arellano school colors	UPHD school colors	Mapua school colors	Lyceum school colors	JRU school colors	SSC-R school colors
JRU	Letran school colors	San Beda school colors	Arellano school colors	UPHD school colors	Mapua school colors	SSC-R school colors	Lyceum school colors	EAC school colors	CSB school colors
Lyceum	UPHD school colors	CSB school colors	Mapua school colors	Letran school colors	SSC-R school colors	JRU school colors	EAC school colors	Arellano school colors	San Beda school colors
Mapúa	Arellano school colors	UPHD school colors	Lyceum school colors	SSC-R school colors	JRU school colors	EAC school colors	San Beda school colors	Letran school colors	CSB school colors
San Beda	SSC-R school colors	JRU school colors	EAC school colors	CSB school colors	Letran school colors	Arellano school colors	Mapua school colors	UPHD school colors	Lyceum school colors
San Sebastian	San Beda school colors	Arellano school colors	UPHD school colors	Mapua school colors	Lyceum school colors	JRU school colors	CSB school colors	Letran school colors	EAC school colors
Perpetual	Lyceum school colors	Mapua school colors	SSC-R school colors	JRU school colors	EAC school colors	CSB school colors	Letran school colors	San Beda school colors	Arellano school colors

Win
Win via forfeit
Loss
Loss via forfeit

==== Semifinals ====
Team	W	L	PCT
Perpetual Lady Altas	3	0	1.000
Letran Lady Knights	2	1	.500
San Sebastian Lady Stags	1	2	.333
EAC Lady Generals	0	3	.000

Qualified for the finals

Teams
Teams	1	2	3
EAC	UPHD school colors	Letran school colors	SSC-R school colors
Letran	SSC-R school colors	EAC school colors	UPHD school colors
San Sebastian	Letran school colors	UPHD school colors	EAC school colors
Perpetual	EAC school colors	SSC-R school colors	Letran school colors

==== Finals ====
Date		Score		Set 1	Set 2	Set 3	Set 4	Set 5	Total
Feb 3	**Perpetual Lady Altas**	**3–2**	Letran Lady Knights	25-16	23-25	25-27	25-20	15-10	**113–98**
Feb 6	**Perpetual Lady Altas**	**3–0**	Letran Lady Knights	25-15	26-24	25-10	-	–	**76–49**
**UPHSD wins series 2–0**

=== Men's tournament ===
The game of SSC-R with UPHSD was rescheduled to January 4 after a brawl during the women's match of the same teams in San Beda Gym.

==== Elimination round ====
Team	W	L	PCT
Perpetual Altas	9	0	1.000
Arellano Chiefs	8	1	.889
**San Beda Red Lions**	7	2	.778
Benilde Blazers	5	4	.556
Letran Knights	4	5	.444
EAC Generals	4	5	.444
Lyceum Pirates	3	6	.333
JRU Heavy Bombers	2	7	.222
Mapúa Cardinals	2	7	.222
San Sebastian Stags	1	8	.111

Season host is boldfaced.

Qualified to the semifinals

Teams
Teams	1	2	3	4	5	6	7	8	9
AU	Mapua school colors	SSC-R school colors	JRU school colors	EAC school colors	CSB school colors	San Beda school colors	Lyceum school colors	Letran school colors	UPHD school colors
CSJL	JRU school colors	EAC school colors	CSB school colors	Lyceum school colors	San Beda school colors	UPHD school colors	Mapua school colors	SSC-R school colors	Arellano school colors
Benilde	EAC school colors	Lyceum school colors	Letran school colors	San Beda school colors	Arellano school colors	UPHD school colors	SSC-R school colors	Mapua school colors	JRU school colors
EAC	CSB school colors	Letran school colors	San Beda school colors	Arellano school colors	UPHD school colors	Mapua school colors	Lyceum school colors	JRU school colors	SSC-R school colors
JRU	Letran school colors	San Beda school colors	Arellano school colors	UPHD school colors	Mapua school colors	SSC-R school colors	Lyceum school colors	EAC school colors	CSB school colors
Lyceum	UPHD school colors	CSB school colors	Mapua school colors	Letran school colors	SSC-R school colors	JRU school colors	EAC school colors	Arellano school colors	San Beda school colors
Mapúa	Arellano school colors	UPHD school colors	Lyceum school colors	SSC-R school colors	JRU school colors	EAC school colors	San Beda school colors	Letran school colors	CSB school colors
San Beda	SSC-R school colors	JRU school colors	EAC school colors	CSB school colors	Letran school colors	Arellano school colors	Mapua school colors	UPHD school colors	Lyceum school colors
San Sebastian	San Beda school colors	Arellano school colors	Mapua school colors	Lyceum school colors	JRU school colors	CSB school colors	Letran school colors	UPHD school colors	EAC school colors
Perpetual	Lyceum school colors	Mapua school colors	JRU school colors	EAC school colors	CSB school colors	Letran school colors	San Beda school colors	SSC-R school colors	Arellano school colors

Win
Loss

==== Semifinals ====
Team	W	L	PCT
Perpetual Altas	3	0	1.000
San Beda Red Lions	2	1	.667
Arellano Chiefs	1	2	.333
Benilde Blazers	0	3	.000

Qualified for the finals

Teams
Teams	1	2	3
Arellano	San Beda school colors	CSB school colors	UPHD school colors
Benilde	UPHD school colors	Arellano school colors	San Beda school colors
San Beda	Arellano school colors	UPHD school colors	CSB school colors
Perpetual	CSB school colors	San Beda school colors	Arellano school colors

==== Finals ====
Date		Score		Set 1	Set 2	Set 3	Set 4	Set 5	Total
Feb 3	**Perpetual Altas**	**3–0**	San Beda Red Lions	28-26	25-22	25-22	-	-	**78–70**
Feb 6	**Perpetual Altas**	**3–0**	San Beda Red Lions	25-14	25-15	25-23	-	–	**75–52**
**UPHSD wins series 2–0**

=== Juniors' tournament ===
==== Elimination round ====
Team	W	L	PCT
EAC–ICA Brigadiers	7	0	1.000
Perpetual Junior Altas	6	1	.857
San Sebastian Staglets	5	2	.714
Arellano Braves	4	3	.571
**San Beda Red Cubs**	3	4	.429
Letran Squires	2	5	.286
Lyceum Junior Pirates	1	6	.143
La Salle Green Hills Greenies	0	7	.000

Season host is boldfaced.

Qualified to the semifinals

Teams
Teams	1	2	3	4	5	6	7
AU	SSC-R school colors	EAC school colors	CSB school colors	San Beda school colors	Lyceum school colors	Letran school colors	UPHD school colors
CSJL	EAC school colors	CSB school colors	Lyceum school colors	San Beda school colors	UPHD school colors	SSC-R school colors	Arellano school colors
Benilde	EAC school colors	Lyceum school colors	Letran school colors	San Beda school colors	Arellano school colors	UPHD school colors	SSC-R school colors
EAC	CSB school colors	Letran school colors	San Beda school colors	Arellano school colors	UPHD school colors	Lyceum school colors	SSC-R school colors
Lyceum	UPHD school colors	CSB school colors	Letran school colors	SSC-R school colors	EAC school colors	Arellano school colors	San Beda school colors
San Beda	SSC-R school colors	EAC school colors	CSB school colors	Letran school colors	Arellano school colors	UPHD school colors	Lyceum school colors
San Sebastian	San Beda school colors	Arellano school colors	UPHD school colors	Lyceum school colors	CSB school colors	Letran school colors	EAC school colors
Perpetual	Lyceum school colors	SSC-R school colors	EAC school colors	CSB school colors	Letran school colors	San Beda school colors	Arellano school colors

Win
Loss

==== Semifinals ====
Team	W	L	PCT
EAC–ICA Brigadiers	2	1	.667
San Sebastian Staglets	2	1	.667
Perpetual Junior Altas	2	1	.667
Arellano Braves	0	3	.000

Qualified for the finals

Teams
Teams	1	2	3
Arellano	EAC school colors	UPHD school colors	SSC-R school colors
EAC	Arellano school colors	SSC-R school colors	UPHD school colors
San Sebastian	UPHD school colors	EAC school colors	Arellano school colors
Perpetual	SSC-R school colors	Arellano school colors	EAC school colors

==== Finals ====
Date		Score		Set 1	Set 2	Set 3	Set 4	Set 5	Total
Feb 3	**EAC–ICA Brigadiers**	**3–1**	San Sebastian Staglets	22-25	25-19	25-23	25-23	-	**97–90**
Feb 6	EAC–ICA Brigadiers	**2–3**	**San Sebastian Staglets**	25-22	20-25	22-25	25-18	16-18	**108–108**
Feb 10	EAC–ICA Brigadiers	**0–0**	San Sebastian Staglets	-	-	-	-	-	**0–0**
**Series tied 1–1**

== Beach Volleyball ==
The Men's and Women's beach volleyball tournaments started last August 13, 2011 at the La Salle Greenhills sandcourt.

=== Men's tournament ===
==== Elimination round ====
Team	W	L	PCT
**Perpetual Altas**	9	0	1.000
Arellano Chiefs	8	1	.889
Letran Knights	7	2	.778
Benilde Blazers	6	3	.667
Lyceum Pirates	4	5	.444
Mapúa Cardinals	3	6	.333
San Beda Red Lions	3	6	.333
San Sebastian Stags	2	7	.222
EAC Generals	2	7	.222
JRU Heavy Bombers	1	8	.111

Season host is boldfaced; guest team is italicized.
Qualified to the semifinals

==== Bracket ====
Semifinals
1	**Perpetual**	**2**
4	Benilde	0
2	**Arellano**	**2**
3	Letran	0

Finals
1	Perpetual	1
2	**Arellano**	**2**

==== Awards ====
- Most Valuable Player: Carlo Lozada, Arellano University

=== Juniors' tournament ===
==== Elimination round ====
Team	W	L	PCT
**Perpetual Junior Altas**	6	1	.857
EAC–ICA Brigadiers	6	1	.857
San Sebastian Staglets	5	2	.714
Arellano Braves	4	3	.571
Letran Squires	4	3	.571
San Beda Red Cubs	2	5	.285
La Salle Green Hills Greenies	1	6	.142
JRU Light Bombers	0	7	.000

Season host is boldfaced.
Qualified to the semifinals

==== Bracket ====
Semifinals
1	**Perpetual**	**2**
4	Arellano	0
2	**EAC**	**2**
3	San Sebastian	0

Finals
1	Perpetual	1
2	**EAC**	**2**

==== Awards ====
- Most Valuable Player: Adrian Jopet Movido, Emilio Aguinaldo College

=== Women's tournament ===
==== Elimination round ====
Team	W	L	PCT
Letran Lady Knights	9	0	1.000
**Perpetual Lady Altas**	8	1	.889
Benilde Lady Blazers	7	2	.778
JRU Lady Bombers	5	4	.556
San Beda Red Lionesses	5	4	.556
Arellano Lady Chiefs	4	5	.444
San Sebastian Lady Stags	4	5	.444
EAC Lady Generals	2	7	.222
Lyceum Lady Pirates	1	8	.111
Mapúa Lady Cardinals	0	9	.000

Season host is boldfaced; guest team is italicized.
Qualified to the semifinals

==== Bracket ====
Semifinals
1	**Letran**	**2**
4	JRU	0
2	**Perpetual**	**2**
3	Benilde	0

Finals
1	Letran	1
2	**Perpetual**	**2**

==== Awards ====
- Most Valuable Player: April Anne Sartin, University of Perpetual Help System DALTA

== Chess ==
The chess tournaments started on July 31, 2011 at SM Centerpoint in Sta. Mesa, Manila.

=== Seniors Division ===
==== Elimination round ====
Team	W	D	L	Pts.
Benilde Blazers	13	2	1	50.5
**San Sebastian Stags**	13	1	2	45
Mapúa Cardinals	8	3	5	38
Letran Knights	6	4	6	35.5
Arellano Chiefs	7	3	6	34.5
EAC Generals	8	3	5	34
San Beda Red Lions	4	3	9	23
JRU Heavy Bombers	2	1	13	14.5
Perpetual Altas	0	2	14	13

Season host is boldfaced.

=== Juniors' Division ===
==== Elimination round ====
Team	W	D	L	Pts.
**San Sebastian Staglets**	14	1	1	51
Arellano Braves	12	1	3	51
La Salle Green Hills Greenies	10	1	5	42.5
Letran Squires	14	1	1	51
EAC–ICA Brigadiers	8	0	8	36
Perpetual Junior Altas	6	0	10	26
JRU Light Bombers	4	0	12	13.5
San Beda Red Cubs	2	1	14	11
Mapúa Red Robins	0	1	15	6

Season host is boldfaced.

== Swimming ==
The swimming tournaments opened last August 19, 2011 at the Rizal Swimming Pool.

=== Men's tournament ===
Team	Points
San Beda Red Lions	1308.5
**Benilde Blazers**	522
EAC Generals	374
Mapúa Cardinals	233
San Sebastian Stags	154
Arellano Chiefs	134.5
Perpetual Altas	110
Letran Knights	75.5
Lyceum Pirates	12
JRU Heavy Bombers	0

=== Women's tournament ===
Team	Points
San Beda Red Lionesses	647.25
**Benilde Lady Blazers**	330.5
Arellano Lady Chiefs	216.75
San Sebastian Lady Stags	199
Lyceum Lady Pirates	116.25
EAC Lady Generals	114.25
Mapúa Lady Cardinals	27.5
JRU Lady Bombers	21

=== Juniors' tournament ===
Team	Points
**La Salle Green Hills Greenies**	1211
San Sebastian Staglets	588
San Beda Red Cubs	493
Arellano Braves	166.5
Perpetual Junior Altas	165.5
EAC–ICA Brigadiers	139.5
Letran Squires	60
Lyceum Junior Pirates	60
Mapúa Red Robins	23
JRU Light Bombers	8

Season host is boldfaced.

== Table Tennis ==
=== Men's Division ===
==== Elimination round ====
Team	W	L
San Beda Red Lions	9	0
Letran Knights	8	1
Benilde Blazers	7	2
EAC Generals	6	3
Perpetual Altas	5	4
**Mapúa Cardinals**	4	5
Arellano Chiefs	3	6
San Sebastian Stags	2	7
JRU Heavy Bombers	1	8
Lyceum Pirates	0	9

Season host is boldfaced.

==== Finals ====
Team	W	L
San Beda Red Lions	3	0
Benilde Blazers	2	1
Letran Knights	1	2
EAC Generals	0	3

=== Women's Division ===
==== Elimination round ====
Team	W	L
Benilde Lady Blazers	8	0
Letran Lady Knights	7	1
Arellano Lady Chiefs	6	2
San Beda Red Lionesses	5	3
EAC Lady Generals	4	4
San Sebastian Lady Stags	3	5
**Mapúa Lady Cardinals**	2	6
Lyceum Lady Pirates	1	7
JRU Lady Bombers	0	8

Season host is boldfaced.

==== Finals ====
Team	W	L
Benilde Lady Blazers	3	0
Letran Lady Knights	2	1
Arellano Lady Chiefs	1	2
San Beda Red Lionesses	0	3

=== Juniors Division ===
==== Elimination round ====
Team	W	L
Arellano Braves	8	0
San Beda Red Cubs	7	1
Letran Squires	6	2
EAC–ICA Brigadiers	5	3
San Sebastian Staglets	4	4
Perpetual Junior Altas	3	5
La Salle Green Hills Greenies	2	6
JRU Light Bombers	1	7
**Mapúa Red Robins**	0	8

Season host is boldfaced.

==== Finals ====
Team	W	L
San Beda Red Cubs	2	3
Arellano Braves	3	2
Letran Squires	1	2
EAC–ICA Brigadiers	0	3

== Taekwondo ==
=== Men's tournament ===
Team	Medals				Points
Team	1st place, gold medalist(s)	2nd place, silver medalist(s)	3rd place, bronze medalist(s)	**Total**	Points
San Beda					**461.5**
Benilde					**344.75**
San Sebastian					**249.75**

=== Women's tournament ===
Team	Medals				Points
Team	1st place, gold medalist(s)	2nd place, silver medalist(s)	3rd place, bronze medalist(s)	**Total**	Points
Benilde					**323**
San Beda					**241.5**
Letran					**234.0**

=== Juniors' tournament ===
Team	Medals				Points
Team	1st place, gold medalist(s)	2nd place, silver medalist(s)	3rd place, bronze medalist(s)	**Total**	Points
Benilde					
Letran					
EAC					

== General Tally ==
As of November 3, 2011.

- Pts.: Position
40	Champion
35	2nd
30	3rd
25	4th
20	5th
10	6th
9	7th
8	8th
4	9th
2	10th
N/A	Did not join

=== Seniors' Division ===
Rank	School	Basketball	Men's Volleyball	Women's volleyball	Chess	Men's Swimming	Women's Swimming	Football	Men's table tennis	Women's table tennis	Lawn tennis	Men's beach volleyball	Women's beach volleyball	Men's Taekwondo	Women's Taekwondo	Track and field	Cheerleading	Pts.
1	AU	9	30	9	20	10	30	-	9	30	-	40	10	25	10	8	25	265
2	Benilde	8	25	8	40	35	35	-	35	40	-	25	30	35	40	20	9	385
3	CSJL	30	20	35	25	8	N/A	-	30	35	-	30	35	20	30	25	30	353
4	EAC	2	10	25	10	30	10	-	25	20	-	4	8	10	25	4	8	191
5	JRU	25	8	4	8	2	8	-	4	4	-	2	20	N/A	N/A	40	20	145
6	LPU	10	9	20	N/A	4	20	-	2	8	-	20	4	8	20	2	10	137
7	MIT	20	4	2	30	25	9	-	10	9	-	10	2	9	8	9	35	182
8	SBC	40	10	35	9	40	40	40	40	25	-	9	25	40	35	10	4	402
9	San Sebastian	35	2	30	35	20	25	-	8	10	-	8	9	30	9	35	2	258
10	**UPHSD**	4	40	40	4	9	N/A	-	20	N/A	-	35	40	4	4	30	40	272

=== Juniors' Division ===
Rank	High School	Basketball	Volleyball	Chess	Swimming	Football	Table tennis	Lawn tennis	Men's beach volleyball	Taekwondo	Track and field	Points
1	Arellano	9	25	35	25	-	35	-	25	20	30	204
2	LSGH	35	8	30	40	-	8	-	25	40	25	211
3	Letran	30	10	25	9	-	30	-	25	35	10	174
4	EAC	25	-	20	10	-	20	-	40	30	35	180
5	JRU	8	N/A	9	2	-	8	-	8	N/A	2	37
6	Lyceum	2	9	N/A	8	-	N/A	-	N/A	N/A	8	27
7	MHSS	20	N/A	4	4	-	4	-	N/A	9	4	45
8	San Beda	40	20	8	30	-	40	-	10	25	9	182
9	San Sebastian	10	-	40	35	-	20	-	30	10	40	185
10	**Perpetual**	4	30	10	20	-	10	-	35	N/A	20	129

== General Championship race ==
Season host is boldfaced.

Note: This is as of February 7, 2012.

=== Juniors' Division ===
Rank	Team	Total
1	La Salle Green Hills Greenies	211
2	Arellano Braves	204
3	San Sebastian Staglets	185
4	San Beda Red Cubs	182
5	EAC–ICA Brigadiers	180
6	Letran Squires	174
7	**Perpetual Junior Altas**	129
8	Mapúa Red Robins	45
9	JRU Light Bombers	37
10	Lyceum Junior Pirates	27

=== Seniors' Division ===
Rank	Team	Total
1	San Beda Red Lions	402
2	Benilde Blazers	385
3	Letran Knights	353
4	**Perpetual Altas**	272
5	Arellano Chiefs	265
6	San Sebastian Stags	258
7	EAC Generals	191
8	Mapúa Cardinals	182
9	JRU Heavy Bombers	145
10	Lyceum Pirates	137

== See also ==
- UAAP Season 74
