= NCAA Season 91 =

- Host school: Mapúa Institute of Technology
- Tagline: "Engineered for Sports Excellence in The New Decade"

General
- Seniors: San Beda Red Lions
- Juniors: San Beda Red Lions

Seniors' champions
Sport		Men	Women
Basketball		Letran	N/A
Volleyball		Perpetual	Benilde
Chess		Arellano	
Taekwondo		San Beda	Benilde
Table tennis		Benilde	San Beda
Lawn tennis		San Beda	Benilde (DS)
Soft tennis		San Beda (DS)	San Beda
Swimming		San Beda	San Beda
Beach volleyball		Mapúa	San Sebastian
Track and field		Arellano	N/A
Football		Arellano	N/A
Badminton		Benilde	Benilde
- Poomsae: Benilde (Coed)
- Cheerdance: Perpetual (Ex - Coed)

Juniors' champions
Sport		Boys	Girls
Basketball		San Beda	N/A
Volleyball		Perpetual	
Chess		San Beda	
Taekwondo		LSGH	
Table tennis		San Beda	
Lawn tennis		San Beda	
Swimming		LSGH	
Beach volleyball		San Sebastian	
Track and field		EAC–ICA	
Football		LSGH	
Badminton		LSGH	
- (NT) = No tournament; (DS) = Demonstration Sport; (Ex) = Exhibition;

NCAA Season 91 was the 2015–16 collegiate athletic year of the National Collegiate Athletic Association (NCAA) in the Philippines. It was hosted by the Mapúa Institute of Technology, now Mapúa University and was opened on June 27, 2015, at the Mall of Asia Arena in Pasay hosted by Andrei Felix and Myrtle Sarrosa and ended on March 8, 2016, with the Cheerleading Competition and closing ceremonies held at the MOA Arena, which was also hosted by Felix and Sarrosa, together with Anton Roxas, Migs Bustos, Ceej Tantengco and Roxanne Montealegre.

This was the first season after the NCAA renewed its broadcasting deal with ABS-CBN Sports, after a 3-year contract with Sports5. ABS-CBN previously covered the NCAA games from 2002 to 2011 until it left for Sports5/AKTV starting on Season 88 in 2012.

Lyceum of the Philippines University and Emilio Aguinaldo College were accredited as full members of the NCAA, based from their performance in Season 90. In the end of the season, San Beda College regain the general championship title, dethroning De La Salle-College of Saint Benilde in seniors, and also having a 3-peat championship for the juniors division.

== Basketball ==
Basketball tournaments were officially opened on June 27, 2015, at the Mall of Asia Arena. Proceeding games elimination round games, which is a double round robin tournament, were held at the Filoil Flying V Arena. The top four teams qualify for the semifinals, where the higher-seeded team possesses the twice-to-beat advantage. The winners qualify to the best-of-three finals. The playoffs were held at the Mall of Asia Arena.

=== Seniors' tournament ===
==== Elimination round ====
Pos	Team	W	L	PCT	GB	Qualification
1	San Beda Red Lions	13	5	.722 (Note: First-seed playoff: San Beda 83–78 Letran)	—	Twice-to-beat in the semifinals
2	Letran Knights	13	5	.722	—	Twice-to-beat in the semifinals
3	Mapúa Cardinals (H)	12	6	.667 (Note: Head-to-head record: JRU 3–1, Mapúa 2–2, Arellano 1–3; fourth-seed playoff: Mapúa 93–75 Arellano, third-seed playoff: Mapúa 83–76 JRU)	1	Twice-to-win in the semifinals
4	JRU Heavy Bombers	12	6	.667	1	Twice-to-win in the semifinals
5	Arellano Chiefs	12	6	.667	1	
6	Perpetual Altas	11	7	.611	2	
7	San Sebastian Stags	6	12	.333	7	
8	Benilde Blazers	5	13	.278	8	
9	Lyceum Pirates	4	14	.222	9	
10	EAC Generals	2	16	.111	11	

Source: ABS-CBN Sports
Rules for classification: 1) winning percentage; 2) if tied for top 4, one-game playoff; 3) head-to-head record; 4) overall point differential
(H) Hosts

==== Playoffs ====
Semifinals (Top 2 twice-to-beat)
1	San Beda	78
4	JRU	68
2	Letran	91
3	Mapúa	90

Finals (Best-of-three playoff)
1	San Beda	90	68	82
2	Letran	94	61	85*

*Overtime

==== Awards ====
- Most Valuable Player: Allwell Oraeme ( Mapua)
- Rookie of the Year: Allwell Oraeme ( Mapua)

=== Juniors' tournament ===
==== Elimination round ====
Pos	Team	W	L	PCT	GB	Qualification
1	San Beda Red Cubs	18	0	1.000	—	Thrice-to-beat in the Finals (Note: As San Beda won all of their elimination round games, the stepladder format will be used instead of the regular Final Four format.)
2	Mapúa Red Robins (H)	16	2	.889	2	Proceed to stepladder round 2
3	Arellano Braves	12	6	.667	6	Proceed to stepladder round 1
4	La Salle Green Hills Greenies (Note: LSGH's first round win against Letran was forfeited after three of its players were ruled to be ineligible for wearing uniform numbers outside the league-mandated 4 to 19.)	11	7	.611 (Note: Fourth-seed playoff: LSGH 88–71 Lyceum)	7	Proceed to stepladder round 1
5	Lyceum Junior Pirates	11	7	.611	7	
6	EAC–ICA Brigadiers	9	9	.500	9	
7	Letran Squires	6	12	.333	12	
8	San Sebastian Staglets	4	14	.222	14	
9	JRU Light Bombers	2	16	.111	16	
10	Perpetual Junior Altas	1	17	.056	17	

Source: ABS-CBN Sports
Rules for classification: 1) winning percentage; 2) if tied for top 4, one-game playoff; 3) head-to-head record; 4) head-to-head point differential; 5) overall point differential
(H) Hosts

==== Playoffs ====
Stepladder round 1 (Single-elimination)
3	Arellano	75
4	LSGH	74

Stepladder round 2 (Single-elimination)
2	Malayan	79
3	Arellano	85

Finals (No. 1 thrice-to-beat)
1	San Beda–Rizal	76	68	70
3	Arellano	68	72	61

==== Awards ====
- Most Valuable Player: Michael Enriquez ( Mapua)
- Rookie of the Year: Lars Sunga ( Arellano)

== Volleyball ==
The volleyball tournament started on November 30, 2015, at the Filoil Flying V Arena. Collegio de San Juan de Letran will be the event host. All teams participate in an elimination round which is a round robin tournament. The top four teams qualify in the semifinals, where the unbeaten team bounces through the finals, with a thrice-to-beat advantage, higher-seeded team possesses the twice-to-beat advantage, or qualify to the first round. The winners qualify to the finals.

=== Men's tournament ===
==== Elimination round ====
Pos	Team	Pld	W	L	Pts	SW	SL	SR	SPW	SPL	SPR	Qualification
1	EAC Generals	9	8	1	24	26	6	4.333	765	631	1.212	Qualified to the semifinals with a twice-to-beat advantage
2	Perpetual Altas	9	8	1	22	24	8	3.000	755	643	1.174	Qualified to the semifinals with a twice-to-beat advantage
3	Benilde Blazers	9	7	2	20	22	10	2.200	751	659	1.140	Qualified to the semifinals first-round playoff
4	San Beda Red Lions	9	5	4	16	21	16	1.313	823	817	1.007	Qualified to the semifinals first-round playoff
5	Arellano Chiefs	9	5	4	14	18	16	1.125	746	715	1.043	Qualified to fourth-seed playoff
6	Lyceum Pirates	9	4	5	13	19	19	1.000	816	833	0.980	
7	San Sebastian Stags	9	3	6	9	10	19	0.526	623	694	0.898	
8	Mapúa Cardinals	9	3	6	9	10	20	0.500	648	699	0.927	
9	Letran Knights (H)	9	2	7	7	11	22	0.500	711	786	0.905	
10	JRU Heavy Bombers	9	0	9	1	2	27	0.074	572	713	0.802	

(H) Season host

==== Playoffs ====
Semifinals (Nos. 1 & 2 have twice-to-beat advantage)
1	EAC	3
4	San Beda	2
2	Perpetual	3
3	Benilde	2

Finals (Best-of-three series)
1	EAC	3	1	2
2	Perpetual	1	3	3

==== Awards ====
- Most Valuable Player : Howard Mojica ( EAC)
- Rookie of the Year: Walt Amber Gervacio ( San Sebastian)

=== Women's tournament ===
==== Elimination round ====
Pos	Team	Pld	W	L	Pts	SW	SL	SR	SPW	SPL	SPR	Qualification
1	San Sebastian Lady Stags	9	9	0	26	27	6	4.500	793	601	1.319	Qualified to the finals with the thrice-to-beat advantage
2	Arellano Lady Chiefs	9	8	1	23	25	6	4.167	757	580	1.305	Qualified to the semifinals
3	Perpetual Lady Altas	9	7	2	19	22	11	2.000	734	689	1.065	Qualified to the first-round playoff
4	Benilde Lady Blazers	9	6	3	19	23	13	1.769	823	697	1.181	Qualified to the first-round playoff
5	Lyceum Lady Pirates	9	4	5	13	17	20	0.850	743	806	0.922	
6	JRU Lady Bombers	9	4	5	12	15	16	0.938	654	687	0.952	
7	San Beda Red Lionesses	9	3	6	10	13	21	0.619	689	754	0.914	
8	EAC Lady Generals	9	3	6	8	14	24	0.583	741	801	0.925	
9	Mapúa Lady Cardinals	9	1	8	3	7	26	0.269	655	784	0.835	
10	Letran Lady Knights (H)	9	0	9	2	6	27	0.222	619	744	0.832	

(H) Season host

==== Playoffs ====
Stepladder round 1 (One-game playoff)
3	Perpetual	1
4	Benilde	3

Semifinals (One-game playoff)
2	Arellano	0
4	Benilde	3

Finals (No. 1 seed has to win twice; opponent thrice)
1	San Sebastian	1	1	3	1
4	Benilde	3	3	1	3

==== Awards ====
- Most Valuable Player : Grethcel Soltones ( San Sebastian)
- Rookie of the Year: Nieza Viray ( San Beda)

== Beach volleyball ==
The NCAA Season 91 beach volleyball tournament will be held on February 10–14, 2016 at the Marina Bay Resort, Subic, Zambales.

=== Men's tournament ===
#	Team
1st place, gold medalist(s)	**Mapúa Cardinals**
2nd place, silver medalist(s)	Perpetual Altas
3rd place, bronze medalist(s)	EAC Generals
4	Lyceum Pirates
5	Benilde Blazers
6	Arellano Chiefs
7	San Beda Red Lions
8	San Sebastian Stags
9	Letran Knights
10	JRU Heavy Bombers

Season host is boldfaced.

=== Women's tournament ===
#	Team
1st place, gold medalist(s)	San Sebastian Lady Stags
2nd place, silver medalist(s)	San Beda Red Lionesses
3rd place, bronze medalist(s)	Benilde Lady Blazers
4	EAC Lady Generals
5	Perpetual Lady Altas
6	Lyceum Lady Pirates
7	Letran Lady Knights
8	JRU Lady Bombers
9	Arellano Lady Chiefs
10	**Mapúa Lady Cardinals**

Season host is boldfaced.

=== Junior's Tournament ===
#	Team
1st place, gold medalist(s)	San Sebastian Stags
2nd place, silver medalist(s)	EAC Generals
3rd place, bronze medalist(s)	Perpetual Altas
4	Letran Knights
5	Arellano Chiefs
6	Lyceum Pirates
7	San Beda Red Lions
8	Benilde Blazers
9	JRU Heavy Bombers

Season host is boldfaced.

== Football ==
The football tournament will be start on December 1, 2015, at the Rizal Memorial Coliseum. San Sebastian College Recoletos will be the event host. Each tournament is divided into two rounds. The winner of both rounds faces each other in the Finals; if a single team wins both rounds, that team is declared the champion.

AU Chiefs was crowned as the champion of the men's tournament, defeated the long-time champions San Beda Red Lions, 2–0.

=== Seniors' tournament ===
==== First round ====
Pos	Team	Pld	W	D	L	GF	GA	GD	Pts	Qualification
1	Arellano Chiefs	6	6	0	0	24	3	+21	18	Finals and second round
2	San Beda Red Lions	6	4	1	1	45	2	+43	13	Second round
3	Benilde Blazers	6	4	1	1	22	3	+19	13	Second round
4	Lyceum Pirates	6	2	1	3	10	7	+3	7	Second round
5	Mapúa Cardinals (H)	6	2	1	3	13	37	−24	7	
6	Perpetual Altas	6	1	0	5	6	38	−32	3	
7	EAC Generals	6	0	0	6	4	36	−32	0	

(H) Hosts

==== Second round ====
Pos	Team	Pld	W	D	L	GF	GA	GD	Pts
1	Arellano Chiefs	0	0	0	0	0	0	0	0
2	Benilde Blazers	0	0	0	0	0	0	0	0
3	Lyceum Pirates	0	0	0	0	0	0	0	0
4	San Beda Red Lions	0	0	0	0	0	0	0	0

MVP: Jumbeng Guinabang

=== Juniors' tournament ===
==== First round ====
Pos	Team	Pld	W	D	L	GF	GA	GD	Pts
1	Arellano Braves	0	0	0	0	0	0	0	0
2	Letran Squires	0	0	0	0	0	0	0	0
3	La Salle Green Hills Greenies	0	0	0	0	0	0	0	0
4	EAC–ICA Brigadiers	0	0	0	0	0	0	0	0
5	JRU Light Bombers	0	0	0	0	0	0	0	0
6	Lyceum Junior Pirates	0	0	0	0	0	0	0	0
7	Mapúa Red Robins	0	0	0	0	0	0	0	0
8	San Beda Red Cubs	0	0	0	0	0	0	0	0
9	San Sebastian Staglets	0	0	0	0	0	0	0	0
10	Perpetual Junior Altas	0	0	0	0	0	0	0	0

==== Second round ====
Pos	Team	Pld	W	D	L	GF	GA	GD	Pts
1	Arellano Braves	0	0	0	0	0	0	0	0
2	Letran Squires	0	0	0	0	0	0	0	0
3	La Salle Green Hills Greenies	0	0	0	0	0	0	0	0
4	EAC–ICA Brigadiers	0	0	0	0	0	0	0	0
5	JRU Light Bombers	0	0	0	0	0	0	0	0
6	Lyceum Junior Pirates	0	0	0	0	0	0	0	0
7	Mapúa Red Robins	0	0	0	0	0	0	0	0
8	San Beda Red Cubs	0	0	0	0	0	0	0	0
9	San Sebastian Staglets	0	0	0	0	0	0	0	0
10	Perpetual Junior Altas	0	0	0	0	0	0	0	0

== Swimming ==
The San Beda College men's swimming team extended its domination of the NCAA to a 14th straight year, while its women's team completed a four-peat in the Season 91 swimming event that concluded over the weekend at the Rizal Memorial Swimming Center.

=== Men's tournament ===
#	Team	Total
1st place, gold medalist(s)	San Beda Sea Lions	1,374 pts.
2nd place, silver medalist(s)	Benilde Blazers	608.5 pts.
3rd place, bronze medalist(s)	EAC Generals	252.5 pts.
4		-
5		-
6		-
7		-
8		-
9		-
10		-

Season host is boldfaced.

Eliminated

=== Women's tournament ===
#	Team	Total
1st place, gold medalist(s)	San Beda Sea Lionesses	1,123.5 pts.
2nd place, silver medalist(s)	Benilde Lady Blazers	1,000.5 pts.
3rd place, bronze medalist(s)	EAC Lady Generals	251.5 pts.
4		-
5		-
6		-
7		-
8		-
9		-
10		-

Season host is boldfaced.

Eliminated

=== Juniors' tournament ===
#	Team	Total
1st place, gold medalist(s)	La Salle Green Hills Greenies	1,102 pts.
2nd place, silver medalist(s)	San Beda Red Cubs	836.5 pts.
3rd place, bronze medalist(s)		-
4		-
5		-
6		-
7		-
8		-
9		-
10		-

Season host is boldfaced.

Eliminated

== Badminton ==
=== Men's tournament ===
#	Team
1st place, gold medalist(s)	Benilde Blazers
2nd place, silver medalist(s)	Letran Knights
3rd place, bronze medalist(s)	San Beda Red Lions
**4**	EAC Generals
**5**	Mapúa Cardinals
**6**	Lyceum Pirates
**7**	**Arellano Chiefs**
**8**	Perpetual Altas
**9**	JRU Heavy Bombers

Season host is boldfaced.

=== Women's tournament ===
#	Team	W	L	Tie
1st place, gold medalist(s)	Arellano Lady Chiefs	0	0	-
2nd place, silver medalist(s)	Letran Lady Knights	0	0	-
3rd place, bronze medalist(s)	Benilde Lady Blazers	0	0	-
**4**	EAC Lady Generals	0	0	-
**5**	JRU Lady Bombers	0	0	-
**6**	Lyceum Lady Pirates	0	0	-
**7**	**Mapúa Lady Cardinals**	0	0	-
**8**	San Beda Red Lionesses	0	0	-
**9**	San Sebastian Lady Stags	0	0	-
**10**	Perpetual Lady Altas	0	0	-

Season host is boldfaced.

Qualified to the semifinals.

=== Juniors' tournament ===
#	Team	W	L	Tie
1st place, gold medalist(s)	Arellano Braves	0	0	-
2nd place, silver medalist(s)	Letran Squires	0	0	-
3rd place, bronze medalist(s)	La Salle Green Hills Greenies	0	0	-
**4**	EAC–ICA Brigadiers	0	0	-
**5**	JRU Light Bombers	0	0	-
**6**	Lyceum Junior Pirates	0	0	-
**7**	**Mapúa Red Robins**	0	0	-
**8**	San Beda Red Cubs	0	0	-
**9**	San Sebastian Staglets	0	0	-
**10**	Perpetual Junior Altas	0	0	-

Season host is boldfaced.

Qualified to the semifinals.

== Lawn tennis ==
=== Men's tournament ===
#	Team	W	L	Tie
1st place, gold medalist(s)	Arellano Chiefs	0	0	-
2nd place, silver medalist(s)	Letran Knights	0	0	-
3rd place, bronze medalist(s)	Benilde Blazers	0	0	-
**4**	EAC Generals	0	0	-
**5**	JRU Heavy Bombers	0	0	-
**6**	Lyceum Pirates	0	0	-
**7**	**Mapúa Cardinals**	0	0	-
**8**	San Beda Red Lions	0	0	-
**9**	San Sebastian Stags	0	0	-
**10**	Perpetual Altas	0	0	-

Season host is boldfaced.

Qualified to the semifinals.

=== Juniors' tournament ===
#	Team	W	L	Tie
1st place, gold medalist(s)	Arellano Braves	0	0	-
2nd place, silver medalist(s)	Letran Squires	0	0	-
3rd place, bronze medalist(s)	La Salle Green Hills Greenies	0	0	-
**4**	EAC–ICA Brigadiers	0	0	-
**5**	JRU Light Bombers	0	0	-
**6**	Lyceum Junior Pirates	0	0	-
**7**	**Mapúa Red Robins**	0	0	-
**8**	San Beda Red Cubs	0	0	-
**9**	San Sebastian Staglets	0	0	-
**10**	Perpetual Junior Altas	0	0	-

Season host is boldfaced.

Qualified to the semifinals.

== Table tennis ==
=== Men's tournament ===
#	Team
1st place, gold medalist(s)	Benilde Blazers
2nd place, silver medalist(s)	San Beda Red Lions
3rd place, bronze medalist(s)	Letran Knights
4	Perpetual Altas
5	**Mapúa Cardinals**
6	Arellano Chiefs
7	Lyceum Pirates
8	EAC Generals
9	San Sebastian Stags
10	JRU Heavy Bombers

Season host is boldfaced.

=== Women's tournament ===
#	Team
1st place, gold medalist(s)	San Beda Red Lionesses
2nd place, silver medalist(s)	Benilde Lady Blazers
3rd place, bronze medalist(s)	Arellano Lady Chiefs
4	Letran Lady Knights
5	EAC Lady Generals
6	Lyceum Lady Pirates
7	**Mapúa Lady Cardinals**
8	San Sebastian Lady Stags
9	JRU Lady Bombers

Season host is boldfaced.

=== Juniors' tournament ===
#	Team	W	L	Tie
1st place, gold medalist(s)	Arellano Braves	0	0	-
2nd place, silver medalist(s)	Letran Squires	0	0	-
3rd place, bronze medalist(s)	La Salle Green Hills Greenies	0	0	-
**4**	EAC–ICA Brigadiers	0	0	-
**5**	JRU Light Bombers	0	0	-
**6**	Lyceum Junior Pirates	0	0	-
**7**	**Mapúa Red Robins**	0	0	-
**8**	San Beda Red Cubs	0	0	-
**9**	San Sebastian Staglets	0	0	-
**10**	Perpetual Junior Altas	0	0	-

Season host is boldfaced.

Qualified to the semifinals.

== Chess ==
=== Men's tournament ===
#	Team	Pts
1	Arellano Chiefs	33 1/2
2	Lyceum Pirates	32
3	San Sebastian Stags	31 1/2
4	Benilde Blazers	30
5	San Beda Red Lions	30
6	Letran Knights	22 1/2
7	**Mapúa Cardinals**	16
8	JRU Heavy Bombers	13
9	Perpetual Altas	10
10	EAC Generals	5 1/2

Season host is boldfaced.

Champion.
Tied for semifinal playoff.

=== Juniors' tournament ===
#	Team	Total
1	San Beda Red Cubs	37 1/2
2	Letran Squires	32 1/2
3	Lyceum Junior Pirates	30
4	San Sebastian Staglets	29 1/2
5	La Salle Green Hills Greenies	19
6	Arellano Braves	19
7	**Perpetual Junior Altas**	18 1/2
8	Arellano Braves	8 1/2
9	Mapúa Red Robins	6
10	JRU Light Bombers	3 1/2

Season host is boldfaced.

Champion.
Tied for semifinal playoff.

== Cheerleading ==
The NCAA Season 91 Cheerleading Competition will be held at the SM Mall of Asia Arena in Pasay on March 8, 2016.

Rank	Team	Order	Tumbling	Stunts	Tosses	Pyramids	Deductions	Points
1	**Altas Perpsquad**	8	-	-	-	-	6	195
2	Arellano Chiefsquad	6	-	-	-	-	6	193
3	EAC Pep Squad	2	-	-	-	-	4.5	145
4	JRU Pep Squad	3	-	-	-	-	18	131.5
5	San Beda Red Corps	7	-	-	-	-	6	126
6	LPU Pep Squad	5	-	-	-	-	7	123.55
7	CSB Animo Squad	1	-	-	-	-	5	121
8	Mapua Cheerping Cardinals	4	-	-	-	-	14	120.5
9	Lakas Arriba Cheerleading Team	9	-	-	-	-	14	99.5

Defending champion in boldface
"Order" refers to order of performance.

=== Awards ===
NCAA Season 91 cheerleading champions
Perpetual Altas
Ninth title

== General championship summary ==
The current point system gives 50 points to the champion team in a certain NCAA event, 40 to the runner-up, and 35 to the third placer. The following points are given in consequent order of finish: 30, 25, 20, 15, 10, 8 and 6.

Pts.	Position
50	Champion
40	2nd
35	3rd
30	4th
25	5th
20	6th
15	7th
10	8th
8	9th
6	10th
0	Did not join
WD	Withdrew

=== Seniors' division championships ===
==== Medal table ====
Rank	Team	Gold	Silver	Bronze	Total
1	San Beda Red Lions	7	6	1	14
2	Benilde Blazers	6	4	6	16
3	Arellano Chiefs	3	2	2	7
4	Perpetual Altas	2	3	1	6
5	Letran Knights	1	1	3	5
6	Mapúa Cardinals	1	1	1	3
7	San Sebastian Stags	1	1	1	3
8	Lyceum Pirates	0	2	1	3
9	EAC Generals	0	1	4	5
10	JRU Heavy Bombers	0	0	1	1
Total		21	21	21	63

==== Overall championship tally ====
Rank	School	Basketball	Chess	Men's Swimming	Women's Swimming	Men's Taekwondo	Women's Taekwondo	Men's Badminton	Men's table tennis	Women's table tennis	Men's Volleyball	Women's volleyball	Football	Lawn tennis	Soft tennis	Men's beach volleyball	Women's beach volleyball	Track and field	Pts.
1	San Beda	40	30	50	50	50	40	35	40	50	30	12.5	40	50	50	15	40	10	677.5
2	Benilde	10	35	40	40	35	50	50	50	40	35	50	35	40	35	22.5	35	25	627.5
3	Arellano	25	50	30	30	30	30	15	20	35	25	35	50	20	20	22.5	9.75	50	497.3
4	Lyceum	8	40	8	25	40	25	20	15	20	20	25	30	15	15	30	20	20	376.0
5	Perpetual	20	8	10	6	8	8	10	30	0	50	30	20	30	40	40	25	30	365.0
6	Letran	50	25	20	10	15	20	40	35	30	8	6	0	35	30	8	9.75	6	347.8
7	Mapúa	35	20	15	20	20	10	25	25	15	12.5	8	25	8	0	50	9.75	40	338.3
8	EAC	6	6	35	35	10	15	30	10	25	40	12.5	15	10	10	35	30	8	332.5
9	San Sebastian	15	10	25	15	25	35	0	8	10	12.5	40	0	25	25	10	50	15	320.5
10	JRU	30	15	6	8	0	0	8	6	8	6	20	0	6	0	6	9.75	35	163.8

- Demonstration sports like men's soft tennis, women's lawn tennis, women's badminton, and cheerleading are not included in the overall championship tally, but it is included to the medal table.

=== Juniors' division championships ===
==== Medal table ====
Rank	Team	Gold	Silver	Bronze	Total
1	San Beda Red Cubs	4	3	0	7
2	La Salle Green Hills Greenies	4	1	0	5
3	EAC–ICA Brigadiers	1	2	0	3
4	San Sebastian Staglets	1	1	1	3
5	Perpetual Junior Altas	1	0	1	2
6	Arellano Braves	0	2	3	5
7	Letran Squires	0	2	1	3
8	Lyceum Junior Pirates	0	0	4	4
9	Mapúa Red Robins	0	0	1	1
10	JRU Light Bombers	0	0	0	0
Total		11	11	11	33

==== Overall championship tally ====
Rank	School	Basketball	Chess	Men's Swimming	Men's Taekwondo	Men's Badminton	Men's table tennis	Men's Volleyball	Football	Lawn tennis	Men's beach volleyball	Track and field	Pts.
1	San Beda	50	50	40	30	40	50	15	40	50	15	25	405.0
2	LSGH	30	25	50	50	50	10	10	50	40	10	30	355.0
3	Lyceum	25	35	35	25	35	25	25	30	17.5	20	35	307.5
4	Arellano	40	20	20	40	20	35	35	35	17.5	25	8	295.5
5	Letran	15	40	30	20	30	40	20	20	35	30	10	290.0
6	EAC–ICA	20	10	15	15	25	20	40	25	10	40	50	270.0
7	San Sebastian	10	30	8	35	0	15	30	0	25	50	40	243.0
8	Perpetual	6	15	10	10	0	30	50	15	30	35	15	216.0
9	Malayan	35	8	25	0	10	6	0	0	8	0	6	98.0
10	JRU	8	6	6	0	15	8	0	0	6	8	20	77.0

== Broadcast coverage ==
On the formal turn-over ceremony for NCAA and ABS-CBN held on 18 May 2015, these were the changes to be implemented starting Season 91, ABS-CBN and the League have renewed a 10-year contract deal to air NCAA Games until Season 100 (Centennial Season of the NCAA) in 2024. The network will air Men's Basketball, Women's Volleyball (Final Four and Finals) tournaments, and NCAA Cheerleading Competition via ABS-CBN Sports and Action, Balls HD 167 (basketball tournament only), ABS-CBN Sports and Action HD 166 (volleyball tournament) ABS-CBN Sports and Action (international), and sports.abs-cbn.com every Monday, Tuesday, Thursday and Friday afternoons.

Anchors:

- Anton Roxas (Basketball & Volleyball)
- Andrei Felix (Basketball & Volleyball)
- Boom Labrusca

**Analysts (basketball)**

- Martin Antonio
- Migs Bustos
- Allan Gregorio
- Mikee Reyes
- Olsen Racela

**Analysts (Volleyball)**

- Denden Lazaro
- Kiefer Ravena
- Melissa Gohing
- Michele Gumabao
- Aby Maraño

Courtside reporters:

- Myrtle Sarrosa (Basketball)
- Ceej Tantengco (Basketball & Volleyball)
- Rox Montealegre (Basketball & Volleyball)
- Boom Labrusca (Basketball & Volleyball)

=== Previous courtside reporter of NCAA ===
- Erika Rabara (Basketball)

== See also ==
- UAAP Season 78
