= Francisco Calilan =

Filipino basketball player and coach

Franciso Calilan
Career information
- High school: Torres High School (Manila)
- College: JRC
- Coaching career: 1957–1989

Career history

Coaching
- 1957–1989: JRC
- 1960–1962: Crispa Redmanizers
- 1975: Philippines
- 1982–1986: Northern Cement (assistant)

Career highlights
- As head coach: NCAA champion (1975)
Medals
Men's basketball
Representing the Philippines
Asian Games
Gold medal – first place	1951 New Delhi	team
Assistant coach for Philippines
ABC Championship
Gold medal – first place	1985 Kuala Lumpur	team

Francisco "Kiko" Calilan is a Filipino former basketball player who competed in the 1951 Asian Games.

== Profile ==
Kiko Calilan was a Jose Rizal University graduate, he played for Torres High School in the late 1930s and had a four-year stint in the NCAA with the Heavy Bombers. Kiko starred for several commercial squads in the MICAA, including Olympic Sporting Goods, Heacock's, Philippine Ports Terminal, and Interwood.

In 1948, Calilan was named alternate to the national team that competed in the London Olympics. And three years later, he performed for the nationals in the first Asian Games in New Delhi. Calilan wound up his playing career as a major leaguer in 1951.

In 1954, Calilan began coaching for Yutivo in the Businessman's Athletic Association (BAA). He went on to pilot several clubs, including U-Tex, but made his mark as the Jose Rizal senior varsity mentor in the period 1957-1989. In 1975, Calilan was part of the coaching staff that accompanied the nationals in the eight ABC tournament in Bangkok. His sons Crispin and Cristino have also played in the majors. He became assistant to coach Ron Jacobs for the nationals in the 1982 ABC Youth basketball championships held in Manila.
