= NCAA Season 77 basketball tournaments =

2001 Philippine college basketball season

77th NCAA season
- Host school: Philippine Christian University
Men's Finals	G1	G2	G3	Wins
JRU Heavy Bombers	74	95	62	1
San Sebastian Stags	77	81	95	2
- Duration: September 27 – October 2, 2001
- Arena: Rizal Memorial Coliseum
- Finals MVP: Christian Coronel
- Winning coach: Turo Valenzona (5th title)
- Semifinalists: Mapúa Cardinals; Benilde Blazers
- TV network: PTV/NBN
Juniors' Finals	G1	G2	G3 (OT)	Wins
Letran Squires	74	70	63	2
San Beda Red Cubs	69	80	61	1
- Duration: September 27 – October 2, 2001
- Arena: Rizal Memorial Coliseum
- Finals MVP: Leland Ronquillo
- Winning coach: Jing Ruiz (1st title)
- Semifinalists: San Sebastian Staglets; Mapúa Red Robins

The basketball tournaments of National Collegiate Athletic Association (Philippines) 77th season hosted by the Philippine Christian University began on July 7, 2001, at the Araneta Coliseum with Manila mayor Lito Atienza as the special guest and speaker, followed by the opening ceremonies and a quadruple-header. Games then are subsequently held at Rizal Memorial Coliseum. The opening rites and the games were aired live by the Media Conglomerates Inc. over PTV/NBN through the facilities of Silverstar Communications, Inc.

== Men's tournament ==
=== Elimination round ===
==== Team standing ====
Pos	Team	W	L	PCT	GB	Qualification
1	JRU Heavy Bombers	11	3	.786	—	Twice-to-beat in the semifinals
2	San Sebastian Stags	9	5	.643 (Note: Head-to-head record: Mapua 1–1 San Sebastian, (head-to-head point differential: 0); overall point differential: San Sebastian +87, Mapua +7)	2	Twice-to-beat in the semifinals
3	Mapúa Cardinals	9	5	.643	2	Twice-to-win in the semifinals
4	Benilde Blazers	8	6	.571	3	Twice-to-win in the semifinals
5	PCU Dolphins (H)	7	7	.500	4	
6	Letran Knights	6	8	.429	5	
7	Perpetual Altas	4	10	.286	7	
8	San Beda Red Lions	2	12	.143	9	

Source: The Philippine Star
Rules for classification: 1) winning percentage; 2) ihead-to-head record; 3) head-to-head point differential; 4) overall point differential
(H) Hosts

==== Match-up results ====
	Round 1							Round 2						
Team ╲ Game	1	2	3	4	5	6	7	8	9	10	11	12	13	14
Letran	CSB school colors	PCU school colors	San Beda school colors	UPHD school colors	Mapua school colors	JRU school colors	SSC-R school colors	UPHD school colors	SSC-R school colors	JRU school colors	San Beda school colors	CSB school colors	PCU school colors	Mapua school colors
Benilde	Letran school colors	San Beda school colors	PCU school colors	Mapua school colors	UPHD school colors	SSC-R school colors	JRU school colors	SSC-R school colors	UPHD school colors	Mapua school colors	PCU school colors	Letran school colors	San Beda school colors	JRU school colors
JRU	SSC-R school colors	Mapua school colors	UPHD school colors	San Beda school colors	PCU school colors	Letran school colors	CSB school colors	San Beda school colors	PCU school colors	Letran school colors	Mapua school colors	UPHD school colors	SSC-R school colors	CSB school colors
Mapúa	UPHD school colors	JRU school colors	SSC-R school colors	CSB school colors	Letran school colors	PCU school colors	San Beda school colors	PCU school colors	San Beda school colors	CSB school colors	JRU school colors	SSC-R school colors	UPHD school colors	Letran school colors
PCU	San Beda school colors	Letran school colors	CSB school colors	SSC-R school colors	JRU school colors	Mapua school colors	UPHD school colors	Mapua school colors	UPHD school colors	JRU school colors	SSC-R school colors	CSB school colors	San Beda school colors	Letran school colors
San Beda	PCU school colors	CSB school colors	Letran school colors	JRU school colors	SSC-R school colors	UPHD school colors	Mapua school colors	JRU school colors	Mapua school colors	UPHD school colors	Letran school colors	PCU school colors	CSB school colors	SSC-R school colors
San Sebastian	JRU school colors	UPHD school colors	Mapua school colors	PCU school colors	San Beda school colors	CSB school colors	Letran school colors	CSB school colors	Letran school colors	PCU school colors	UPHD school colors	Mapua school colors	JRU school colors	San Beda school colors
Perpetual	Mapua school colors	SSC-R school colors	JRU school colors	Letran school colors	CSB school colors	San Beda school colors	PCU school colors	Letran school colors	PCU school colors	CSB school colors	San Beda school colors	SSC-R school colors	JRU school colors	Mapua school colors

Source: The Philippine Star
= Win; = OT win; = Loss; = OT loss

==== Scores ====
Results on top and to the right of the dashes are for first-round games; those to the bottom and to the left of it are second-round games.

Teams	CSJL	CSB	JRU	MIT	PCU	SBC	SSC-R	UPHR
Letran Knights	—	65–71	81–85	71–76	70–65	85–77	63–75	81–72
Benilde Blazers	77–71*	—	90–95	60–66	64–68	98–103*	71–77	71–75
JRU Heavy Bombers	81–83	74–84	—	62–56	82–70	103–98	55–54	80–73
Mapúa Cardinals	62–55	61–70	88–85	—	71–73	80–71	60–70	52–61
PCU Dolphins	87–81	81–79	80–87	61–74	—	85–93	55–61	62–64
San Beda Red Lions	67–88	74–91	111–125*	66–68	75–82	—	77–81	78–84
San Sebastian Stags	83–62	69–72	75–81	81–71	65–72	84–69	—	89–81**
Perpetual Altas	70–71	63–76	87–102	72–80	69–74	61–82	64–76	—

Source: The Philippine Star
Legend: Blue = left column team win; Red = top row team win.
Matches with lighter background shading were decided after overtime.

=== Bracket ===
Semifinals (Top 2 twice-to-beat)
1	JRU	84	99
4	Benilde	98	76
2	San Sebastian	58	48
3	Mapúa	65	44

Finals (Best-of-three playoff)
1	JRU	74	95	62
2	San Sebastian	77	81	95

=== Semifinals ===
San Sebastian and JRU have the twice-to-beat advantage. They only have to win once, while their opponents, twice, to progress.

==== (1) JRU vs. (4) Benilde ====
PTV-4

September 20
5:30 p.m.

JRU Heavy Bombers	84–98	Benilde Blazers
Scoring by quarter: 17-26, 21-19, 21-21, 25-32
Pts: Nani Epondulan 22		Pts: Sunday Salvacion 39

Rizal Memorial Coliseum, Manila

PTV-4

September 22
5:00 p.m.

JRU Heavy Bombers	99–76	Benilde Blazers
Pts: Nani Epondulan 35
JRU wins series in two games

Rizal Memorial Coliseum, Manila

In Game 1, the defending champions Blazers relied on its star, Sunday Salvacion, who capped 39 points in the game including six treys. The game was a nip-and-tuck affair until midway in the first half, when Salvacion broke a 14-all deadlock. The Bombers never recovered and faced a 15-point deficit entering the final two minutes.

The Heavy Bombers relied on its veterans to mount a huge lead, 58–32 in the third quarter and never looked back. Defending champion Blazers, however, conspired a comeback by making ten triples, but it wasn't enough to push themselves on the way to Finals. Graduating players ErNani Epondulan finished with 35 points and Ariel Capus made 17 of his own.

==== (2) San Sebastian vs. (3) Mapúa ====
PTV-4

September 20
1:30 p.m.

San Sebastian Stags	58–65	Mapúa Cardinals
Scoring by quarter: 13-21, 23-11, 9-11, 13-22
Pts: Mark Macapagal 14		Pts: Steve Marucot 18

Rizal Memorial Coliseum, Manila

PTV-4

September 22
1:30 p.m.

San Sebastian Stags	48–44	Mapúa Cardinals
Scoring by quarter: 16-11, 10-10, 8-14, 14-9
Pts: Paul Reguerra 10		Pts: Jeff Martin 12
San Sebastian wins series in two games

Rizal Memorial Coliseum, Manila

The Cardinals, led by rookie point guard Jeffrey Martin, Steve Marucot, and Roberto Lagar found their rhythm in the final period of Game 1 to force the Stags to a rubber match. Lagar hit back-to-back treys midway in the final period to give his team the lead, 57–49. However, the Stags recovered and reduced the deficit, 59–58, thanks to Michael Gonzales' pair of charities in the last 21 seconds. The Stags went to fouls to stop the clock when Lagar missed his last free throw but Marucot's putback sealed the victory for the Cardinals.

The Stags, who are enjoying a twice-to-beat advantage, relied on endgame breaks in Game 2 to eliminate Mapúa and advance to the Finals.

=== Finals ===
The San Sebastian Stags are back again in the Finals after their disappointing defeat from CSB Blazers last season. They last held their five-straight championships from 1993 to 1997 and then the streak ended in 1998 at the hands of Letran Knights.

Meanwhile, the JRU Heavy Bombers has not seen a title since 1972. They came close to winning the title in 1999, only to falter to the Letran Knights. The disappointment continued last year when they were beaten twice by the San Sebastian Stags in the semifinals.

PTV-4

September 27
3:30 p.m.

JRU Heavy Bombers	74–77	San Sebastian Stags
Scoring by quarter: 13-18, 20-20, 26-15, 15-24
Pts: Nani Epondulan 16		Pts: Clark Moore 15

Rizal Memorial Coliseum, Manila

PTV-4

September 29
3:30 p.m.

JRU Heavy Bombers	95–81	San Sebastian Stags
Scoring by quarter: 19-21, 28-14, 9-12, 39-34
Pts: Nani Epondulan 26		Pts: Macapagal, Alfad 14 each

Rizal Memorial Coliseum, Manila

PTV-4

October 2
3:30 p.m.

JRU Heavy Bombers	62–95	San Sebastian Stags
Scoring by quarter: 18-23, 17-20, 9-19, 18-33
Pts: Ariel Capus 14		Pts: Mark Macapagal 21
San Sebastian wins series, 2–1

Rizal Memorial Coliseum, Manila

- Finals Most Valuable Player: Christian Coronel (San Sebastian Stags)

The two teams clashed neck-to-neck all throughout Game 1 but the Stags are the better team in crunch time. The Heavy Bombers entered the final quarter with the lead when the Stags applied its pressure defense. Stags' Roy Falcasantos converted a layup in the last 48 seconds of the game to break a 74-all tieup then later converted a charity to give his team the win.

JRU relied on the offense of season MVP Nani Epondulan, Joel Finuliar, Rendel Dela Rea, and Ariel Capus to register a 68–54 lead in the final quarter of Game 2 to keep the Stags at bay and then finally made a comeback to the series.

Showing experience, the Stags never faltered from the start of Game 3, as they outclassed the Heavy Bombers by 33 points en route to their 10th NCAA championship. Nani Epondulan, the season MVP, tallied 13 points in the first half, but was made scoreless in the second half.

=== Awards ===
NCAA Season 77 men's basketball champions
San Sebastian Stags
Tenth title

- Most Valuable Player: Nani Epondulan (JRU Heavy Bombers)
- Mythical Five:
  - Nani Epondulan (JRU Heavy Bombers)
  - Arjun Cordero (San Beda Red Lions)
  - Jondan Salvador (Benilde Blazers)
  - Harold Santa Cruz (Letran Knights)
  - Nelbert Omolon (PCU Dolphins)
- Rookie of the Year: Ismael Junio (Letran Knights)
- Coach of the Year: Arturo Valenzona (San Sebastian Stags)

== Juniors' tournament ==
=== Bracket ===
Semifinals (Top 2 twice-to-beat)
1	Letran	W
4	Mapúa	L
2	San Beda	W
3	San Sebastian	L

Finals (Best-of-three playoff)
1	Letran	74	70	63*
2	San Beda	69	80	61

*Overtime

=== Finals ===
September 27
1:00pm

Letran Squires	74–69	San Beda Red Cubs

Rizal Memorial Coliseum, Manila

September 29
1:00pm

Letran Squires	70–80	San Beda Red Cubs

Rizal Memorial Coliseum, Manila

October 2
1:00pm

Letran Squires	63–61 (OT)	San Beda Red Cubs
Letran wins series, 2–1

Rizal Memorial Coliseum, Manila

- Finals Most Valuable Player: Leland Ronquillo (Letran Squires)

=== Awards ===
NCAA Season 77 juniors' basketball champions
Letran Squires
12th title

- Most Valuable Player: Jay-R Reyes (Letran Squires)
- Rookie of the Year: Jay-R Reyes (Letran Squires)
- Mythical Five:
  - Jay-R Reyes (Letran Squires)
  - JC Intal (Letran Squires)
  - Alvin Banes (San Sebastian Staglets)
  - Mark Lester Benitez (JRU Light Bombers)
  - Jonjon Tabique (San Beda Red Cubs)
- Defensive Player of the Year: Jay-R Reyes (Letran Squires)
- Most Improved Player: Mark Lester Benitez (JRU Light Bombers)
- Coach of the Year: Jing Ruiz (Letran Squires)

Preceded by Season 76 (2000)	NCAA basketball seasons Season 77 (2001)	Succeeded by Season 78 (2002)
