= JRU Heavy Bombers basketball =

Philippine college basketball team

JRU Heavy Bombers
2026 JRU Heavy Bombers basketball team
- University: José Rizal University
- Founded: 1927
- History: JRC Heavy Bombers (until 2000); JRU Heavy Bombers (since 2000)
- Head coach: Nani Epondulan (2nd season)
- Location: Mandaluyong
- Nickname: Heavy Bombers
- Colors: Blue and Yellow

NCAA Champion
- 1948, 1963, 1964, 1967, 1968, 1972

The JRU Heavy Bombers basketball program represents José Rizal University (JRU) in men's basketball as a member of the National Collegiate Athletic Association (Philippines) (NCAA). The JRU Heavy Bombers are the varsity teams with the longest continuous membership in the NCAA, having been a member since 1927 without interruption, and have the longest championship drought.

== History ==
Prior to the Commission on Higher Education granting it university status in 2000, the school was known as José Rizal College (JRC).

JRC won the 1963 and 1964 NCAA titles via the exploits of Rene Canent and Egay Gomez; the former would later be the first president of the Philippine Basketball Association Players Association. The Bombers had another back-to-back title romp in 1967 and 1968 led by 1967 Most Valuable Player Rhoel Deles, Carlos Villamayor and Sixto Agbay.

Their last title was in 1972, when they were led by Philip Cezar, his brother David, and Jimmy Santos. Its entire starting line-up was later drafted in the Philippine Basketball Association. Francisco Calilan coached the Bombers in these five championships, and for 31 seasons from 1958 to 1989.

Starting in 1987, Vergel Meneses led the Heavy Bombers, but would not able to lead them to the championship.

In 1999, JRC was defeated by the Letran Knights in a violence-marred title series. Two years later, now known as JRU, the Bombers lost to the San Sebastian Stags in the Finals. They would next make it to the Finals in 2008 led by John Wilson, but were defeated by the San Beda Red Lions. Coached by Ariel Vanguardia at this time, he coached JRU to three consecutive playoff appearances from 2007 to 2009, after which he resigned. Meneses would then coach the team from 2009 to 2018.

In Meneses' first season, they lost to the Stags in the semifinals, but had Wilson named as the MVP. Meneses further led the Bombers to semifinals finishes in 2010, 2011, 2014 and 2015.

After finishing last place in 2018, and in order to run as mayor of him hometown in Bulakan, Bulacan, Meneses was replaced by former De La Salle coach Louie Gonzalez. JRU missed the playoffs in 2019. Under the bubble set-up, the Heavy Bombers won just once in the condensed 2021 season. JRU missed the playoffs again in 2022, but defeated Final Four qualifier Letran in their final game. The 2022 season was marked with John Amores going on a punching spree against Benilde Blazers players. Amores was then suspended for the rest of the season by the NCAA, and was removed from the team by JRU.

JRU finished the next two seasons outside the playoffs, including a last place finish in 2024. Gonzalez was replaced by former JRU player Nani Epondulan starting in the 2025 season. The Bombers made it to the quarterfinals, losing out to the Perpetual Altas in Epondulan's first year.

== Current roster ==
NCAA Season 102

JRU Heavy Bombers roster
Players
Coaches

Pos.	No.	Nat.	Name	Height	Year	High School
	3	(Philippines)	Agemenyi, Noel	–	–	–
F	21	(Philippines)	Masiglat, Lance	6'3" (1.91m)	–	–
	6	(Philippines)	Eligado, Jamhir	–	–	–
	14	(Philippines)	Bagro, John	–	–	–
F	2	(Philippines)	Castillo, Jayson	6'3" (1.91m)	2	Jose Rizal University
	29	(Philippines)	Garcia, Jalen	–	–	–
PG	5	(Philippines)	Duque, Yuri	5'10" (1.78m)	2	Mapua University
G	10	(Philippines)	Mangubat, Lawrence	–	–	Mapúa University
G	11	(Philippines)	Palis, Jhillian	–	–	–
PG	4	(Philippines)	Garupil, Jay	–	2	Asian College Dumaguete
SG	88	(Philippines)	Herrera, Harry	6'3" (1.91m)	2	San Sebastian College-Recoletos
SF	8	(Philippines)	Laurenaria, Allan	–	2	Mapua University
F	94	(Philippines)	Lozano, Justin	–	–	Jose Rizal University
F	27	(Philippines)	Panapanaan, Ivan	–	–	Arellano University
SG	44	(Philippines)	Peñaverde, Sanlea	–	–	San Sebastian College-Recoletos
SG	1	(Philippines)	Salvador, Sean	6'0" (1.83m)	2	Mapua University
	22	(Philippines)	Mejia, Ring Gold	–	–	–
	72	(Philippines)	Hubilla, Chris	6'4" (1.93m)	–	Mapúa University

Head coach

- (Philippines) Nani Epondulan

Assistant coach(es)

- (Philippines) Yong Garcia
- (Philippines) Edsel Vallena
- (Philippines) Don Urro
- (Philippines) Juan Miguel Martin
- (Philippines) Joaqui Garcia
- (Philippines) Carl Reyes
- (Philippines) Joselito Aguilar
- (Philippines) Del Milla
- (Philippines) Jodee Valeña
- (Philippines) Jose Carillo

Team manager

- (Philippines) Christopher Conwi

Legend

- (C) Team captain
- Injured

- Roster
Updated: 2025-11-17

== Head coaches ==
- c. 1948: Mateo Adao
- 1958–1989: Francisco Calilan
- 1989–1996: Egay Gomez
- 1996–2003: Boy de Vera
- 2004–2005: Cris Calilan
- 2006–2009: Ariel Vanguardia
- 2010–2018: Vergel Meneses
- 2019–2024: Louie Gonzalez
- 2025–present: Nani Epondulan

== Season-by-season records ==
Season	League	Elimination round						Playoffs			
Season	League	Pos	GP	W	L	PCT	GB	GP	W	L	Results
1999	NCAA	2nd/8	14	9	5	.643	—	3	1	2	Lost Finals vs Letran
2000	NCAA	1st/8	14	11	3	.786	—	2	0	2	Lost semifinals vs San Sebastian
2001	NCAA	1st/8	14	11	3	.786	—	5	2	3	Lost Finals vs San Sebastian
2002	NCAA	4th/8	14	9	5	.643	2	1	0	1	Lost semifinals vs San Sebastian
2003	NCAA	3rd/8	14	8	6	.571	1	1	0	1	Lost semifinals vs San Sebastian
2004	NCAA	7th/8	14	4	10	.286	6	Did not qualify			
2005	NCAA	8th/8	14	2	12	.143	11	Did not qualify			
2006	NCAA	7th/8	14	4	10	.286	9	Did not qualify			
2007	NCAA	3rd/7	12	7	5	.583	4	1	0	1	Lost semifinals vs Letran
2008	NCAA	2nd/7	14	9	5	.643	2	6	4	2	Lost Finals vs San Beda
2009	NCAA	3rd/10	18	15	3	.883	1	2	1	1	Lost semifinals vs San Sebastian
2010	NCAA	3rd/9	16	12	4	.750	4	2	1	1	Lost stepladder round 2 vs San Sebastian
2011	NCAA	4th/10	18	9	9	.500	7	1	0	1	Lost semifinals vs San Beda
2012	NCAA	5th/10	18	10	8	.556	5	1	0	1	Lost 4th seed playoff vs Perpetual
2013	NCAA	8th/10	18	6	12	.333	9	Did not qualify			
2014	NCAA	3rd/10	18	12	6	.667	1	2	1	1	Lost semifinals vs Arellano
2015	NCAA	4th/10	18	12	6	.667	1	2	0	2	Lost semifinals vs San Beda
2016	NCAA	5th/10	18	9	9	.500	5	Did not qualify			
2017	NCAA	3rd/10	18	11	7	.611	7	1	0	1	Lost stepladder round 1 vs San Sebastian
2018	NCAA	10th/10	18	3	15	.167	14	Did not qualify			
2019	NCAA	8th/10	18	5	13	.278	13	Did not qualify			
2020 (Note: Season cancelled due to the COVID-19 pandemic.)	NCAA	Season canceled									
2021 (Note: Season postponed to early 2022 due to the COVID-19 pandemic.)	NCAA	10th/10	9	1	8	.111	8	Did not qualify			
2022	NCAA	9th/10	18	7	11	.389	7	Did not qualify			
2023	NCAA	6th/10	18	10	8	.556	5	Did not qualify			
2024	NCAA	10th/10	18	4	14	.222	11	Did not qualify			
2025	NCAA	4th/5	13	6	7	.462	3	2	1	1	Lost quarterfinals vs Perpetual
2026	NCAA	2nd/5	13	10	3	.769	—				

== Honors ==
=== Team honors ===
- National Collegiate Athletic Association
  - Champions (5): 1948, 1963, 1964, 1968, 1972
- Filoil EcoOil Preseason Cup
  - Champions (1): 2026

=== Player honors ===
- NCAA Most Valuable Player
  - Rhoel Deles (1): 1967
  - Sixto Agbay (1): 1969
  - Philip Cezar (1): 1972
  - Estelito Epondulan (1): 1990
  - Nani Epondulan (1): 2001
  - John Wilson (1): 2009
- NCAA Most Improved Player:
  - Joe Etame (1): 2010
  - Michael Mabulac (1): 2013
  - Jed Mendoza (1): 2017
