= NCAA basketball tournament =

NCAA basketball tournament may refer to the following:

== United States ==
- NCAA Division I men's basketball tournament (March Madness)
- NCAA Division I women's basketball tournament (Women's March Madness)
- NCAA Division II men's basketball tournament
- NCAA Division II women's basketball tournament
- NCAA Division III men's basketball tournament
- NCAA Division III women's basketball tournament

== Philippines ==
- NCAA Basketball Championship (Philippines)
