= San Beda–Letran rivalry =

Philippine collegiate sports rivalry

San Beda–Letran men's basketball rivalry
- San Beda Red Lions Letran Knights
- Sport: Men's basketball
- Latest meeting: October 5, 2026 (Playtime Filoil Centre, San Juan); San Beda, 74-65^{OT}
- Next meeting: TBA

Statistics
- All-time record: NCAA Final Four (Philippines) appearances: San Beda 20; Letran 18; Titles: San Beda: NCAA 24; Letran: NCAA 20
- Longest win streak: San Beda, 15 (2007–2012)
- Current win streak: San Beda, 3 (2025–present)

Locations of San Beda (red) and Letran (blue).

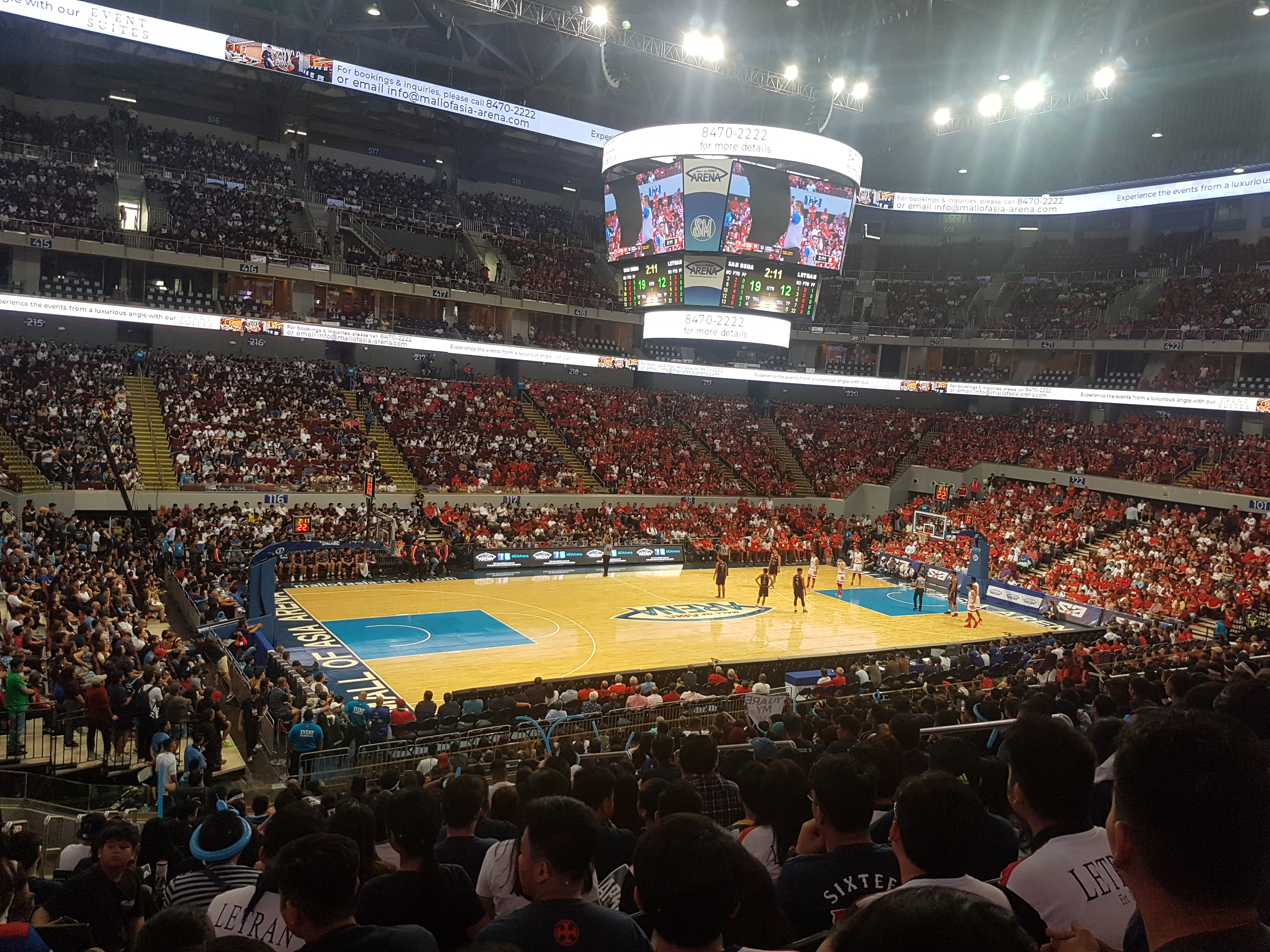
NCAA Season 95 basketball tournaments men's finals game 3 between San Beda and Letran

The San Beda–Letran rivalry is a multiple sport competition between two Philippine schools. This rivalry is between Mendiola's San Beda and Muralla's Letran. The rivalry is played at the National Collegiate Athletic Association (Philippines).

== Head-to-head record by sport ==
=== Seniors' Division ===
As of October 2016, the San Beda Red Lions have more collegiate championships in the seniors' division compared to the Letran Knights. San Beda has 112 seniors' collegiate championships while Letran has 94. Letran leads the General Championships Tally with 9 titles with San Beda having 8.

San Beda leads Letran 9–4 in different all-time sports categories.

- Badminton – San Beda (3) – Letran (2)
- Basketball – San Beda (23) – Letran (20)
- Beach Volleyball – Letran (3) – San Beda (2)
- Chess – Letran (6) – San Beda (3)
- Football – San Beda (24) – Letran (7)
- Lawn Tennis – San Beda (16) – Letran (11)
- Soft Tennis – San Beda (5) – Letran (none)
- Softball – San Beda (3) – Letran (1)
- Swimming – San Beda (32) – Letran (2)
- Table Tennis – San Beda (15) – Letran (12)
- Taekwondo – San Beda (10) – Letran (6)
- Track and Field – Letran (6) – San Beda (none)
- Volleyball – Letran (22) – San Beda (none)

Both schools have yet to win collegiate championships in cheerleading.

==== General Championship ====
Letran leads the General Championship race with 9–8.

- Letran (9) – 1979–80, 1997–98, 1998–99, 1999–2000, 2000–01, 2001–02, 2002–03, 2003–04, 2009–10
- San Beda (7) – 2010–11, 2011–2012, 2012–2013, 2015–16, 2016–2017, 2017–18, 2018–19, 2023–2024

=== Juniors' Division ===
As of October 2016, the San Beda Red Cubs leads the rivalry in the juniors' division with 102 championships while the Letran Squires has 70 championships. The Red Cubs also lead the general championships tally with 14 compared to the Squires' 8 general championships.

San Beda leads Letran 6–5 in different all-time sports categories.

- Basketball – San Beda (23) – Letran (13)
- Beach Volleyball – Letran (1) – San Beda (none)
- Chess – Letran (13) – San Beda (5)
- Football – San Beda (16) – Letran (5)
- Lawn Tennis – San Beda (16) – Letran (7)
- Softball – San Beda (2) – Letran (none)
- Swimming – San Beda (22) – Letran (2)
- Table Tennis – Letran (17) – San Beda (6)
- Taekwondo – Letran (3) – San Beda (1)
- Track and Field – San Beda (8) – Letran (6)
- Volleyball – Letran (5) – San Beda (4)

==== General Championship ====
San Beda leads the General Championship race with 14–8.

- San Beda (14) – 1982, 1988, 1989, 1990, 1991, 1993, 1995, 1996, 1997, 2013, 2014, 2015, 2016, 2017
- Letran (8) – 1983, 1986, 1987, 1998, 1999, 2000, 2001, 2002

== Basketball Statistics ==
=== Men's basketball results ===
The rivalry started on October 28, 1950, when Letran and San Beda meet in the finals for the first time. Letran then was led by Lauro Mumar while San Beda was led by Carlos Loyzaga. Letran is on the verge of sweeping the tournament to become eventual champions (the Final 4 format was not yet implemented), but San Beda beat them to arrange a championship showdown with the Knights. In the finals, Letran got their sweet revenge as they beat San Beda to get their second title in the NCAA. The Letran team was called "Murder Inc." by the late Willie Hernandez because of their merciless brand of basketball. After that historic match, San Beda kept on winning many championships until the 1970s while Letran ended the 1970s with six championships. During the 1980s the NCAA saw the downfall of the San Beda basketball program while Letran peaked and became a powerhouse team.

The final four was instituted in 1997; prior to that the first and second round winners, plus the team with the best overall standing if it did not win either round, participated in the championship round to determine the champion.

With the exit of their fierce rivals, Ateneo for San Beda and La Salle for Letran, some say the rivalry has died down because of their heaven and earth situation not until in 2006 when the Lions won their 12th championship after 28 years. During that same year San Beda won twice against Letran and denied the Knights to gain a twice-to-beat advantage in the Final Four.

In 2007, San Beda and Letran played for the championship for the second time which was dubbed "The Dream Finals" because it featured two NCAA teams who have very rich basketball history and tradition. In this series, San Beda had a championship score to settle with Letran (to avenge their defeat in the finals 57 years prior). The Red Lions eventually swept the Knights, 2–0. San Beda's Rogemar Menor was named as the 2007 NCAA Finals MVP. Right now they are the most anticipated games in the NCAA which led to bringing the games at the Araneta Coliseum. They are also compared to UAAP's Ateneo–La Salle where in some columnists say it is the "icing in the cake" of today's NCAA.

From 2005 to 2023, either San Beda, Letran or both appeared in every NCAA seniors' basketball championship, with the two schools combining to win all but one championship during this span. San Beda and Letran faced off in the 2007, 2012, 2013, 2015 and 2019 championship round, with San Beda winning three of the five championships.

==== Pre-Final Four era ====
San Beda victories	Letran victories

No.	Date	Location	Winner	Score	Note/s
1	1982	Rizal Memorial Coliseum	Letran	109–86	
(*) = finals games; (^) = semifinals; (≠) = seeding playoffs

==== Final Four era ====
Both teams are expected to meet at least 2 times per year.

San Beda victories	Letran victories

No.	Date	Location	Winner	Score	Note/s
1	July 25, 2000	Rizal Memorial Coliseum	Letran	77–61	
2	September 5, 2000	Rizal Memorial Coliseum	Letran	68–59	
3	July 10, 2001	Rizal Memorial Coliseum	Letran	85–77	
4	September 4, 2001	Rizal Memorial Coliseum	Letran	88–67	
5	June 29, 2002	Araneta Coliseum	Letran	69–64	(Note: Opening game.)
6	August 23, 2002	Rizal Memorial Coliseum	Letran	67–54	
7	July 7, 2003	Rizal Memorial Coliseum	Letran	69–63	
8	August 18, 2003	Rizal Memorial Coliseum	Letran	76–65	
9	July 7, 2004	Rizal Memorial Coliseum	Letran	70–55	
10	August 25, 2004	Rizal Memorial Coliseum	Letran	79–70^{OT}	
11	June 29, 2005	Cuneta Astrodome	Letran	63–54	
12	August 12, 2005	Cuneta Astrodome	Letran	68–58	(Note: Letran had a 10–0 record prior to the game.)
13	July 19, 2006	Ninoy Aquino Stadium	San Beda	67–59	(Note: Letran had a 6–0 record prior to the game. San Beda's 1st win against Letran in years.)
14	September 13, 2006	Araneta Coliseum	San Beda	54–43	(Note: San Beda overcame a 12-point deficit to win the game.)
15	July 25, 2007	The Arena in San Juan	Letran	70–69	(Note: San Beda had a 5–0 record prior to the game, Letran's 1st win against San Beda since 2005.)
16	August 31, 2007	Araneta Coliseum	San Beda	87–84	(Note: Game was marred by a brawl during and after the game.)
17	September 19, 2007*	Araneta Coliseum	San Beda	76–68	(Note: Finals Game 1. 1st Meeting between San Beda and Letran in the Finals since 1950 and also San Beda's 1st win against Letran in the finals since the 1950 Finals defeat.)
18	September 26, 2007*	Araneta Coliseum	San Beda	76–64	(Note: Finals Game 2. San Beda successfully defends their title. Letran's 1st defeat in the finals since the 1980s and under Coach Louie Alas.)
19	July 30, 2008	Cuneta Astrodome	San Beda	71–67	(Note: Letran had a 6–0 record prior to the game.)
20	September 10, 2008	Araneta Coliseum	San Beda	65–63^{OT}	(Note: San Beda's Borgie Hermida shoots the winning shot with just 2 seconds left in OT. San Beda then went on to win their third consecutive championship title.)
21	July 24, 2009	Filoil Flying V Arena	San Beda	79–74	
22	September 23, 2009	Filoil Flying V Arena	San Beda	76–64	
23	October 16, 2009^	Filoil Flying V Arena	San Beda	82–76	(Note: Semifinals. San Beda lost in the Finals vs. San Sebastian.)
24	July 21, 2010	Filoil Flying V Arena	San Beda	77–60	(Note: San Beda had a 3–0 record prior to the game.)
25	September 24, 2010	Filoil Flying V Arena	San Beda	74–56	(Note: San Beda had a 14–0 record prior to the game.)
26	August 10, 2011	Filoil Flying V Arena	San Beda	77–62	(Note: San Beda had a 5–0 record prior to the game.)
27	October 7, 2011	Filoil Flying V Arena	San Beda	84–68	(Note: San Beda now has a 12-game winning streak against Letran since 2007. This secured them a twice-to-beat advantage.)
28	August 16, 2012	Filoil Flying V Arena	San Beda	65–43	
29	September 1, 2012	Filoil Flying V Arena	San Beda	68–62	
30	October 18, 2012*	Mall of Asia Arena	San Beda	62–60	(Note: Finals Game 1. San Beda leads 1–0. First NCAA game and San Beda–Letran game held at the Mall of Asia Arena.)
31	October 20, 2012*	Smart Araneta Coliseum	Letran	64–55	(Note: Finals Game 2. Letran ties the series and at the same time breaks their 15-game losing streak to San Beda since 2007.)
32	October 26, 2012*	Smart Araneta Coliseum	San Beda	67–39	(Note: Finals Game 3. San Beda wins their 17th championship, the most in the league. This is also their 6th championship in 7 years.)
33	August 24, 2013	Mall of Asia Arena	Letran	74–67	(Note: Both teams sport a 7–1 record prior to the game.)
34	October 21, 2013	Filoil Flying V Arena	San Beda	76–72^{OT}	
35	November 11, 2013*	Mall of Asia Arena	San Beda	80–68	(Note: Finals Game 1.)

No.	Date	Location	Winner	Score	Note/s
36	November 14, 2013*	Mall of Asia Arena	Letran	79–74	(Note: Finals Game 2. Series tied at 1–1 all as Raymond Almazan as the Best Player of the Game.)
37	November 16, 2013*	Mall of Asia Arena	San Beda	60–56	(Note: Finals Game 3. San Beda won its 18th Championship Title; Arthur dela Cruz was declared as the Finals MVP of NCAA Season 89.)
38	August 13, 2014	Filoil Flying V Arena	Letran	64–53	(Note: Mark Cruz as The Best Player of The Game.)
39	September 13, 2014	Filoil Flying V Arena	San Beda	73–44	(Note: Arthur Dela Cruz is the Best Player of The Game.)
40	July 16, 2015	Filoil Flying V Arena	Letran	93–80	(Note: Both teams had a 2–0 record prior to the game.)
41	October 6, 2015	Filoil Flying V Arena	San Beda	77–73	(Note: Both teams are gunning for a final four slot and a twice to beat advantage prior to the game.)
42	October 13, 2015≠	Mall of Asia Arena	#1 San Beda	83–78	(Note: Battle for 1st seed.)
43	October 23, 2015*	Mall of Asia Arena	Letran	94–90	(Note: Finals Game 1. Letran handles San Beda's 1st Game 1 loss of the Finals since 2009.)
44	October 27, 2015*	Mall of Asia Arena	San Beda	68–61	(Note: Finals Game 2.)
45	October 29, 2015*	Mall of Asia Arena	Letran	85–82	(Note: Finals Game 3. Letran ends a 10-year title drought and Mark Cruz was named the NCAA Season 91 Finals MVP, San Beda's Championship streak ended at 5.)
46	June 25, 2016	Mall of Asia Arena	San Beda	89–85	(Note: Opening game.)
47	August 26, 2016	Filoil Flying V Arena	San Beda	83–71	(Note: Both teams came from a loss prior to the game.)
48	July 25, 2017	Filoil Flying V Arena	San Beda	81–74	
49	October 13, 2017	Filoil Flying V Arena	San Beda	73–68	
50	August 10, 2018	Filoil Flying V Arena	San Beda	80–76^{OT}	(Note: San Beda had a 4–0 record prior to the game.)
51	September 11, 2018	Filoil Flying V Arena	San Beda	74–68	
52	August 10, 2019	Cuneta Astrodome	San Beda	70–66	(Note: San Beda had a 4–0 record prior to the game.)
53	October 1, 2019	Filoil Flying V Arena	San Beda	75–63	(Note: San Beda had a 14–0 record prior to the game.)
54	November 12, 2019*	Mall of Asia Arena	Letran	65–64	(Note: Finals Game 1. Letran dealt San Beda's 1st Game 1 loss of the Finals since 2015 at the same time its 1st loss of the season after sweeping the regular season thus ending San Beda's 32-game winning streak dating back from last season and also Letran snapped its 8-game losing skid against San Beda since 2016.)
55	November 15, 2019*	Mall of Asia Arena	San Beda	79–76	(Note: Finals Game 2.)
56	November 19, 2019*	Mall of Asia Arena	Letran	81–79	(Note: Finals Game 3. Letran ended its 4-year title drought. Fran Yu was named as the NCAA Season 95 Finals MVP.)
57	April 29, 2022	Filoil EcoOil Centre	Letran	59–56	(Note: First San Beda-Letran NCAA game since the COVID-19 pandemic. Letran had an 8–0 record prior to the game. Letran swept the single-round elimination.)
58	September 30, 2022	Filoil EcoOil Centre	San Beda	76–68	
59	November 16, 2022	Filoil EcoOil Centre	San Beda	91–77	(Note: Letran was on a 9-game winning streak prior to the game.)
60	October 6, 2023	Filoil EcoOil Centre	San Beda	68–63	(Note: San Beda dealt Letran its worst start in recent years with a 0–4 record.)
61	November 24, 2023	Filoil EcoOil Centre	San Beda	77–68	
62	October 1, 2024	Filoil EcoOil Centre	San Beda	66–64	
63	November 10, 2024	Filoil EcoOil Centre	Letran	75–71	
64	October 5, 2025	Playtime Filoil Centre	San Beda	68–58	
65	November 23, 2025	Playtime Filoil Centre	Letran	87–83	
66	December 10, 2025*	Smart Araneta Coliseum	San Beda	89–70	(Note: Finals Game 1.)
67	December 13, 2025*	Smart Araneta Coliseum	San Beda	83–71	(Note: Finals Game 2. San Beda wins its 24th NCAA Men's Basketball Championship.)
68	October 5, 2026	Playtime Filoil Centre	San Beda	74–65^{OT}	
Series: San Beda leads 43–25
(*) = finals games; (^) = semifinals; (≠) = seeding playoffs

=== Juniors' Basketball Results ===
==== Pre-Final Four era ====
San Beda victories	Letran victories

No.	Date	Location	Winner	Score	Note/s
1	1988	Rizal Memorial Coliseum	San Beda	1–0	
2	1988	Rizal Memorial Coliseum	San Beda	1–0	(Note: San Beda swept both the first and second round pennant. Needing to win to force a playoff for the second-round pennant, the Light Bombers fell short to the Red Cubs at the final game of the second round when John Henry Reyes split his free throw at the final seconds of the game, giving San Beda a 1-point 92–91 victory.)
3	1990	Rizal Memorial Coliseum	Letran	1–0	

No.	Date	Location	Winner	Score	Note/s
4	1990	Rizal Memorial Coliseum	Letran	1–0	(Note: Letran Squires completed a two-round sweep in winning back the Junior title they last held in 1985. The Squires were first-round winners when JRC Light Bombers were stripped of the pennant for fielding an ineligible player.)
(*) = finals games; (^) = semifinals; (≠) = seeding playoffs

==== Final Four era ====
Since 2007, San Beda leads the rivalry 28–7 but if the game on July 21, 2010, favored San Beda, San Beda will still be the leader of the rivalry but with a better record of 29–6.

San Beda victories	Letran victories

No.	Date	Location	Winner	Score	Note/s
1	September 27, 2001*	Rizal Memorial Coliseum	Letran	74–69	(Note: Finals Game 1. Letran leads series, 1–0.)
2	September 29, 2001*	Rizal Memorial Coliseum	San Beda	80–70	(Note: Finals Game 2. Series tied, 1–1)
3	October 2, 2001*	Rizal Memorial Coliseum	Letran	63–61^{OT}	(Note: Finals Game 3. Letran wins its 12th juniors basketball championship.)
4	2002	Rizal Memorial Coliseum	San Beda	1–0	
5	2002	Rizal Memorial Coliseum	San Beda	1–0	(Note: Since San Beda swept the elimination round, they have a twice-to-beat advantage over eventual finals contender, Letran.)
6	September 18, 2002*	Rizal Memorial Coliseum	Letran	97–94	(Note: This is a de facto best of three series with San Beda automatically leading 1–0. Therefore, San Beda has to win once, while Letran needed twice, to win the championship. San Beda was in command for most of Game 1, but Letran refused to lose and then took the lead, 90–88. San Beda then tied the game 93–all, thanks to Ford Arao's two free throws, 47 seconds remaining in the final period. In the next play, OJ Cua gave the lead again to the Squires, 95–93. Both teams split their charities in the final seconds, when Squire Marlon Bituin grabbed the miss from the other team, giving the Red Cubs their first loss of the season and sealing the victory for the Squires.)
7	September 20, 2002*	Rizal Memorial Coliseum	San Beda	95–81	(Note: The Red Cubs claimed their 11th NCAA juniors championship in the deciding Game 2, thanks to JVee Casio and Arvin Braganza's outside shooting and Jay Agbayani's inside presence.)
8	2003	Rizal Memorial Coliseum	San Beda	1–0	
9	2003	Rizal Memorial Coliseum	San Beda	1–0	(Note: San Beda swept the elimination round.)
10	September 20, 2004*	Rizal Memorial Coliseum	San Beda	87–77	(Note: Finals Game 1. San Beda leads series, 1–0)
11	September 22, 2004*	Araneta Coliseum	Letran	81–76	(Note: Finals Game 2. Series tied, 1–1.)
12	September 24, 2004*	Araneta Coliseum	San Beda	88–72	(Note: Finals Game 3. San Beda wins its 15th juniors basketball championship.)
13	2005		San Beda	1–0	
14	2005		San Beda	1–0	(Note: Letran was winless for the whole season.)
15	2006		San Beda	1–0	
16	2006		San Beda	1–0	(Note: Letran was winless for the whole season.)
17	September 12, 2007^	Araneta Coliseum	San Beda	96–86	(Note: Semifinals. Letran has twice-to-beat advantage.)
18	September 14, 2007^	The Arena in San Juan	Letran	96–92	(Note: Semifinals. Letran lost in the finals vs. San Sebastian.)
19	July 30, 2008	Cuneta Astrodome	Letran	91–77	
20	September 5, 2008	Cuneta Astrodome	Letran	65–61	
21	July 24, 2009	The Arena in San Juan	Letran	99–84	(Note: Letran had a 5–0 record prior to the game. Letran gave San Beda–Rizal its first and only elimination round loss of the season.)
22	October 2, 2009	Filoil Flying V Arena	San Beda	92–91	(Note: Letran had a 17–0 record prior to the game. San Beda–Rizal gave Letran its first and only elimination round loss of the season.)
23	October 14, 2009≠	Filoil Flying V Arena	#1 San Beda	91–77	(Note: 1st seed playoff.)
24	October 22, 2009*	Araneta Coliseum	San Beda	98–75	(Note: Finals – Game 1. San Beda leads series 1–0.)
25	October 24, 2009*	Araneta Coliseum	Letran	83–80	(Note: Finals – Game 2. Series tied with 1–1.)
26	October 29, 2009*	Araneta Coliseum	San Beda	86–75	(Note: Finals – Game 3, San Beda ends 5-year title drought.)
27	July 21, 2010	Filoil Flying V Arena	San Beda	86–71 (Note: Game forfeited due to the wrong uniform of San Beda's player, Baser Amer.)	
28	September 24, 2010	The Arena in San Juan	San Beda	86–71	
29	October 6, 2010^	The Arena in San Juan	San Beda	86–71	(Note: Semifinals. San Beda went on to win the championship vs. San Sebastian.)

No.	Date	Location	Winner	Score	Note/s
30	August 1, 2011	Filoil Flying V Arena	San Beda	84–72	(Note: San Beda had a 5–0 record prior to the game.)
31	October 7, 2011	Filoil Flying V Arena	San Beda	88–63	(Note: San Beda had a 16–0 record prior to the game. San Beda now has a 4-game winning streak against Letran since 2010.)
32	August 16, 2012	Filoil Flying V Arena	San Beda	86–69	(Note: San Beda had an 8–0 record prior to the game.)
33	September 1, 2012	Filoil Flying V Arena	San Beda	73–64	(Note: San Beda had a 10–0 record prior to the game.)
34	October 13, 2012^	Smart Araneta Coliseum	San Beda	61–57	(Note: Semifinals. San Beda now has a 7-game winning streak against Letran since 2010, San Beda went on to win the championship vs. San Sebastian.)
35	August 25, 2013	Filoil Flying V Arena	San Beda	100–86	(Note: San Beda had an 8–0 record prior to the game.)
36	October 21, 2013	Filoil Flying V Arena	San Beda	95–84	(Note: San Beda had a 16–0 record prior to the game.)
37	August 13, 2014	Filoil Flying V Arena	San Beda	70–48	
38	September 13, 2014	Filoil Flying V Arena	San Beda	88–83	
39	July 16, 2015	Filoil Flying V Arena	San Beda	99–59	(Note: San Beda now has 12 game winning streak against Letran.)
40	October 6, 2015	Filoil Flying V Arena	San Beda	76–67	(Note: San Beda had a 17–0 record prior to the game and San Beda swept the elimination round after beating Letran.)
41	June 27, 2016	Filoil Flying V Arena	San Beda	107–74	(Note: Opening game.)
42	September 8, 2016	Filoil Flying V Arena	San Beda	96–83	(Note: San Beda was on a 6-game winning streak prior to the game.)
43	July 25, 2017	Filoil Flying V Arena	San Beda	91–45	
44	October 13, 2017	Filoil Flying V Arena	San Beda	63–60	
45	August 10, 2018	Filoil Flying V Arena	San Beda	75–74^{OT}	
46	September 11, 2018	Filoil Flying V Arena	San Beda	61–60^{OT}	
47	August 10, 2019	Cuneta Astrodome	San Beda	83–79	
48	October 1, 2019	Filoil EcoOil Centre	San Beda	108–80	
49	February 3, 2023	Emilio Aguinaldo College Gym	Letran	94–68	
50	February 16, 2024	Filoil EcoOil Centre	San Beda	88–72	
51	March 12, 2025	Filoil EcoOil Centre	Letran	71–64	
52	April 13, 2025≠	Filoil EcoOil Centre	#3 San Beda	74–59	(Note: Bronze and Third place playoff game.)
53	October 5, 2025	Playtime Filoil Centre	Letran	63–61	
54	November 23, 2025	Playtime Filoil Centre	San Beda	81–77^{2OT}	
55	October 5, 2026	Playtime Filoil Centre	Letran	72–67	
Series: San Beda leads 41–14
(*) = finals games; (^) = semifinals; (≠) = seeding playoffs

=== Final Four Rankings ===
For comparison, these are the rankings of these two teams since the Final Four format was introduced.

==== Seniors' division ====
A.Y.	Letran	San Beda
1997–1998	3rd	2nd
1998–1999	1st	4th
1999–2000	4th	5th
2000–2001	7th	6th
2001–2002	6th	8th
2002–2003	6th	7th
2003–2004	1st	6th
2004–2005	3rd	4th
2005–2006	1st	7th
2006–2007	3rd	1st
2007–2008	2nd	1st
2008–2009	3rd	1st
2009–2010	4th	1st
2010–2011	5th	1st
2011–2022	3rd	1st
2012–2013	3rd	1st
2013–2014	2nd	1st
2014–2015	6th	1st
2015–2016	2nd	1st
2016–2017	6th	1st
2017–2018	5th	2nd
2018–2019	3rd	1st
2019–2020	3rd	1st
2021–2022	1st	3rd
2022–2023	2nd	4th
2023–2024	9th	3rd
2024–2025	6th	3rd

Finished as the champion
Finished as the 1st runner-up
Finished as the 2nd runner-up
Finished as the 3rd runner-up

== Volleyball Statistics ==
=== Men's volleyball results ===
Letran and San Beda competed at the NCAA Men's Volleyball Finals in Season 85.

San Beda victories	Letran victories

No.	Date	Location	Winner	Score	Note/s
1	2008	Saint Placid's Gym	Letran	3–0	
2	2008	Saint Placid's Gym	Letran	3–0	
3	2009	Emilio Aguinaldo College Gym	San Beda	3–0	
4	2009^	Emilio Aguinaldo College Gym	San Beda	3–0	
5	October 11, 2009*	Emilio Aguinaldo College Gym	Letran	3–2	(Note: Finals Game 1.)
6	October 15, 2009*	Emilio Aguinaldo College Gym	San Beda	3–1	(Note: Finals Game 2.)
7	October 18, 2009*	Emilio Aguinaldo College Gym	Letran	3–2	(Note: Finals Game 3. Letran won its 13th volleyball championship.)
8	2010		Letran	3–0	
9	2010^		San Beda	3–0	
10	2011	Saint Placid's Gym	San Beda	3–0	
11	2012		San Beda	3–0	
12	2013		San Beda	3–1	
13	2015	Filoil Flying V Arena	San Beda	3–0	

No.	Date	Location	Winner	Score	Note/s
14	2016	Filoil Flying V Arena	San Beda	3–0	
15	2017	Filoil Flying V Arena	San Beda	3–1	
16	2018	Filoil Flying V Arena	San Beda	3–0	
17	January 24, 2019	Filoil Flying V Arena	San Beda	3–1	
18	February 19, 2023	Filoil EcoOil Centre	San Beda	3–1	
19	May 4, 2024	Filoil EcoOil Centre	Letran	3–1	
20	March 27, 2025	Emilio Aguinaldo College Gym	Letran	3–1	
21	April 23, 2025	FilOil EcoOil Centre	San Beda	3–2	
22	February 3, 2026	San Andres Sports Complex	San Beda	3–1	
23	March 8, 2026	San Andres Sports Complex	San Beda	3–0	
Series: San Beda leads 16–7
(*) = finals games; (^) = semifinals; (≠) = seeding playoffs

=== Women's volleyball results ===
San Beda victories	Letran victories

No.	Date	Location	Winner	Score	Note/s
1	2008	Saint Placid's Gym	Letran	3–0	
2	2008	Saint Placid's Gym	Letran	3–0	
3	2009	Emilio Aguinaldo College Gym	Letran	3–0	
4	2010		Letran	3–0	
5	2010^		Letran	3–0	
6	2011	Saint Placid's Gym	San Beda	3–0	
7	2012		San Beda	3–0	
8	2013		San Beda	3–0	
9	2015	Filoil Flying V Arena	San Beda	3–0	
10	2016	Filoil Flying V Arena	San Beda	3–2	
11	2017	Filoil Flying V Arena	San Beda	3–2	
12	2018	Filoil Flying V Arena	San Beda	3–0	
13	January 24, 2019	Filoil Flying V Arena	San Beda	3–1	

No.	Date	Location	Winner	Score	Note/s
14	June 22, 2022	Paco Arena	Letran	3–2	
15	February 19, 2023	Filoil EcoOil Centre	Letran	3–0	
16	May 4, 2024	Filoil EcoOil Centre	Letran	3–2	
17	March 27, 2025	Emilio Aguinaldo College Gym	Letran	3–1	
18	April 23, 2025	FilOil EcoOil Centre	Letran	3–1	
19	February 3, 2026	San Andres Sports Complex	Letran	3–1	(Note: Both teams had a 3–0 record prior to the game.)
20	March 8, 2026	San Andres Sports Complex	Letran	3–0	(Note: Letran swept the elimination round.)
21	March 22, 2026^	Strike Gymnasium, Bacoor, Cavite	Letran	3–1	(Note: Best-of-three semifinal match game 1.)
22	March 25, 2026^	San Andres Sports Complex	San Beda	3–1	(Note: Best-of-three semifinal match game 2. San Beda gave Letran its first loss of the season, tied the semifinals series at 1–1, and forced a rubber match.)
23	March 28, 2026^	San Andres Sports Complex	Letran	3–1	(Note: Best-of-three semifinal match game 3.)
Series: Letran leads 14–9
(*) = finals games; (^) = semifinals; (≠) = seeding playoffs

== See also ==
- San Beda Red Lions
- National Collegiate Athletic Association (Philippines)
- Battle of Intramuros
- San Beda–San Sebastian rivalry
- Ateneo–La Salle rivalry
