= NCAA softball championships (Philippines) =

The NCAA softball championship was the softball tournament of the National Collegiate Athletic Association in the Philippines. The tournament was discontinued in 1986.

== Champions ==
Academic Year	Seniors	Juniors
1965–66	Ateneo de Manila University (1)	Ateneo de Manila University (1)
1966–67	Mapúa Institute of Technology (1)	De La Salle College (1)
1967–68	San Beda College (1)	De La Salle College (2)
1968–69	Mapúa Institute of Technology (2)	Ateneo de Manila University (2)
1969–70	Mapúa Institute of Technology (3)	San Beda College (1)
1970–71	San Beda College (2)	La Salle Green Hills (1)
1971–72	San Beda College (3) and Mapúa Institute of Technology (4)	La Salle Green Hills (2)
1972–73	Mapúa Institute of Technology (5)	La Salle Green Hills (3)
1973–74	Mapúa Institute of Technology (6)	La Salle Green Hills (4)
1974–75	De La Salle College (1)	La Salle Green Hills (5)
1975–76	Mapúa Institute of Technology (7)	San Beda College (2)
1976–77	De La Salle University (2)	San Sebastian College–Recoletos (1)
1977–78	De La Salle University (3)	San Sebastian College–Recoletos (2)
1979–80	Colegio de San Juan de Letran (1)	Mapúa Institute of Technology (1)
1980–81	Mapúa Institute of Technology (8)	La Salle Green Hills (6)
1981–82	Mapúa Institute of Technology (9)	Mapúa Institute of Technology (2)
1982–83	Mapúa Institute of Technology (10)	None
1983–84	No tournament	
1984–85	No tournament	
1985–86	Mapúa Institute of Technology (11)	None
After 1986	Discontinued	

== Number of championships by school ==
School	Srs	Jrs	All
Mapúa University	11	2	13
La Salle Green Hills*	0	6	6
San Beda University	3	2	5
De La Salle University*	3	2	5
Ateneo de Manila University	1	2	3
San Sebastian College–Recoletos	0	2	2
Colegio de San Juan de Letran	1	0	1

NOTE

- LSGH won its six championships under DLSU. It now plays under CSB.

== See also ==
- UAAP Softball Championship
