= NCAA table tennis championships =

Table Tennis tournament

NCAA Table Tennis championship
- Sport: Table Tennis
- Founded: 1985
- Country: Philippines
- Most recent champions: Men's division: De La Salle–College of Saint Benilde; Women's division: De La Salle–College of Saint Benilde; Juniors' division: San Beda University–Rizal
- Most titles: Men's division: De La Salle–College of Saint Benilde, San Beda University (9 titles); Women's division: De La Salle–College of Saint Benilde (9 titles); Juniors' division: Colegio de San Juan de Letran (18 titles)

The National Collegiate Athletic Association (Philippines) table tennis tournament is held every February of the year-long NCAA season.

== Champions ==
Denotes school won 2 out of the 3 divisions in the same year
Denotes school won juniors', men's and women's championship in the same year

Academic Year	Men's	Women's	Juniors'
1985–86	Colegio de San Juan de Letran (1)	No tournament	Mapúa Institute of Technology (1)
1986–87	San Sebastian College–Recoletos (1)	No tournament	Colegio de San Juan de Letran (1)
1987–88	San Sebastian College–Recoletos (2)	No tournament	Colegio de San Juan de Letran (2)
1988–89	San Sebastian College–Recoletos (3)	No tournament	Colegio de San Juan de Letran (3)
1989–90	Colegio de San Juan de Letran (2)	No tournament	Colegio de San Juan de Letran (4)
1990–91	San Beda College (1)	No tournament	Colegio de San Juan de Letran (5)
1991–92	San Beda College (2)	No tournament	Colegio de San Juan de Letran (6)
1992–93	San Sebastian College–Recoletos (4)	No tournament	San Sebastian College–Recoletos (1)
1993–94	Mapúa Institute of Technology (1)	No tournament	San Sebastian College–Recoletos (2)
1994–95	San Sebastian College–Recoletos (5)	No tournament	Mapúa Institute of Technology (2)
1995–96	Mapúa Institute of Technology (2)	No tournament	San Sebastian College–Recoletos (3)
1996–97	Mapúa Institute of Technology (3)	No tournament	San Sebastian College–Recoletos (4)
1997–98	University of Perpetual Help Rizal (1)	No tournament	Colegio de San Juan de Letran (7)
1998–99	University of Perpetual Help Rizal (2)	No tournament	Colegio de San Juan de Letran (8)
1999–2000	University of Perpetual Help Rizal (3)	No tournament	Colegio de San Juan de Letran (9)
2000–01	Colegio de San Juan de Letran (3)	Colegio de San Juan de Letran (1)	Colegio de San Juan de Letran (10)
2001–02	Colegio de San Juan de Letran (4)	Colegio de San Juan de Letran (2)	Colegio de San Juan de Letran (11)
2002–03	Colegio de San Juan de Letran (5)	Colegio de San Juan de Letran (3)	Colegio de San Juan de Letran (12)
2003–04	Colegio de San Juan de Letran (6)	Colegio de San Juan de Letran (4)	Colegio de San Juan de Letran (13)
2004–05	Colegio de San Juan de Letran (7)	Philippine Christian University (1)	Philippine Christian University (1)
2005–06	De La Salle–College of Saint Benilde (1)	De La Salle–College of Saint Benilde (1)	Colegio de San Juan de Letran (14)
2006–07	Philippine Christian University (1)	De La Salle–College of Saint Benilde (2)	La Salle Green Hills (1)
2007–08	Colegio de San Juan de Letran (8)	De La Salle–College of Saint Benilde (3)	Colegio de San Juan de Letran (15)
2008–09	De La Salle–College of Saint Benilde (2)	De La Salle–College of Saint Benilde (4)	San Beda College–Rizal (1)
2009–10	San Beda College (3)	De La Salle–College of Saint Benilde (5)	San Beda College–Rizal (2)
2010–11	San Beda College (4)	De La Salle–College of Saint Benilde (6)	Arellano University (1)
2011–12	San Beda College (5)	De La Salle–College of Saint Benilde (7)	San Beda College–Rizal (3)
2012–13	San Beda College (6)	De La Salle–College of Saint Benilde (8)	Colegio de San Juan de Letran (16)
2013–14	San Beda College (7)	San Beda College (1)	Colegio de San Juan de Letran (17)
2014–15	De La Salle–College of Saint Benilde (3)	San Beda College (2)	San Beda College–Rizal (4)
2015–16	De La Salle–College of Saint Benilde (4)	San Beda College (3)	San Beda College–Rizal (5)
2016–17	De La Salle–College of Saint Benilde (5)	San Beda College (4)	Arellano University (1)
2017–18	De La Salle–College of Saint Benilde (6)	San Beda College (5)	San Beda University–Rizal (6)
2018–19	De La Salle–College of Saint Benilde (7)	San Beda University (6)	Colegio de San Juan de Letran (18)
2019–20	San Beda University (8)	San Beda University (7)	San Beda University–Rizal (7)
2020–21	Not held due to COVID-19 pandemic		
2021–22	Not held due to COVID-19 pandemic		
2022–23	Not held due to COVID-19 pandemic		
2023–24	De La Salle–College of Saint Benilde (8)	University of Perpetual Help System DALTA (1)	University of Perpetual Help System DALTA (1)
2024–25	San Beda University (9)	San Beda University (8)	San Beda University–Rizal (8)
2025–26	De La Salle–College of Saint Benilde (9)	De La Salle–College of Saint Benilde (9)	San Beda University–Rizal (9)

== Number of championships by school ==
The school left the league

School	Men	Women	Jrs	Total
Colegio de San Juan de Letran	8	4	18	30
San Beda University	9	8	9	26
De La Salle–College of Saint Benilde	9	9	0	18
San Sebastian College–Recoletos	5	0	4	9
Arellano University	0	0	1	1
University of Perpetual Help System DALTA	3	1	1	5
Mapúa University (Note: The Mapúa High School was closed down in 2005. Since 2008, the Malayan High School of Science Red Robins represented Mapúa University in the juniors' division.)	3	0	2	5
Philippine Christian University	1	1	1	3
La Salle Green Hills	0	0	1	1
