= NCAA Season 95 volleyball tournaments =

NCAA Season 95
- Host school: Arellano University

Men's tournament
- Duration: January 10, 2020 (cancelled)
- Arena(s): Filoil Flying V Centre

The NCAA Season 95 volleyball tournaments started on January 10, 2020 at the Filoil Flying V Centre in San Juan, Philippines. Both the men's and women's tournament were cancelled due to the impact of the COVID-19 pandemic in the Philippines.

All teams participated in an elimination round which is a single round robin tournament. The top four teams was supposed to qualify for the semifinals, where the unbeaten team bounces through the finals, with a thrice-to-beat advantage, higher-seeded team possesses the twice-to-beat advantage, or qualify to the first round. The winners were to qualify to the finals.

== Men's tournament ==
=== Team line-up ===
Arellano Chiefs
No.	Name	Position
1	SEGOVIA, Christian (c)	
2	CASUCO, Kean Anderson	
3	TUAZON, John Marphi	
4	CURAMEN, Anfemee	
5	MENESES, Edmark	
6	VILLADOS, Adrian	
7	LAPUZ, Demy Freedom	
8	CABILLAN, Jethro Jasper	
10	ESGUERRA, Joshua	L
13	TAN, Kim Vincent	
14	ENCILA, Ivan	
15	DELA PAZ, Christian	
17	LIBERATO, Jesrael	
18	ISIDRO, Carlo	
	MENESES, Sherwin	HC

Letran Knights
No.	Name	Position
1	TONGII, Andrei	
2	TABBADA, Jaypaul	
3	TUMBALI, Frobel	
4	CISTINA, Christopher	
5	CANZANA, Angel	
6	FRANCISCO, Aeron John	
7	DORIA, Michael	
8	LOZANO, Joshua	
9	REAL, Jhomar	L
10	NICOLAS, Byron	
11	GABUYO, Mhel	
13	MOLACRUZ, Vhan Marco	L
14	SISON, Zechiariah (c)	
15	NOVO, Brylle Kint	
	ESQUIBEL, Brian	HC

Benilde Blazers
No.	Name	Position
1	MAGSINO, Kevin (c)	
2	ADVIENTO, Roniey	
3	TERO, John Carlo	
5	DACULAN, Ryan	
7	BACANI, Owen	
8	ALMONTE, Franz Emille	
9	DY, Ajlan Paul	L
11	GABUYAN, Baron	
12	FAJARDO, Jericho Paolo	
13	DUMARAN, Bryan	L
14	ABROT, Ruvince	
15	GAUANI, Georgie	
17	LAGUIT, James Paul	
19	DE SEQUERA, Joshua	
	LANIOG, Arnold	HC

EAC Generals
No.	Name	Position
1	IMPERIAL, Michael Vince	
2	BUENVIAJE, John Ver	
3	ROMERO, Marvin Williams	
4	CABACANG, Mark Justine	
5	MINA, Joshua (c)	
6	CASTILLO, John Vincent	
7	DADUYA, Aeron	
8	DIONES, Bhim Lawrence	
9	LASALA, Rhedez Yean	L
10	MAGADAN, Earl Joshua	L
11	BANTIANCILA, Kenneth	
12	SARIA, Dearborn	
14	MELAD, Danrich	
15	FLORANO, Christian	
	SANTOS, Melchor	HC

JRU Heavy Bombers
No.	Name	Position
1	ESTACIO, Miguel	
2	SALAZAR, Hernan (c)	
3	AUSINA, Arjay	
4	LAXINA, June	
5	BELDAD, John Albert	L
6	ROSALES, Kaiser Lark	
7	LAHAYLAHAY, Wenjo Froy	
8	LEBICO, Paul Nathaneil	
9	VILLACERAN, Lester Jr	
10	MIGUEL, Matthew	
11	CEBRERO, Wilbert	
12	SARZA, Rogelio Jr	L
14	QUILBAN, Reggie John	
16	DAYNATA, Kenneth	
	DELA PAZ, Ryan Joseph	HC

Lyceum Pirates
No.	Name	Position
1	TIBAYAN, Kier Andrei	
2	LEGASPI, Jhomelle	
3	CASTELLANO, Mark Xiarwille	
4	DIZON, Harvie	
6	BORRES, Eddsel Cris	
7	GOLLOSO, Vergel	L
8	ESCALLAR, Sean Michael	
9	COLONIA, Juvic	
11	MORAL, Kian Carlo	
12	BINAS, Miko (c)	
13	COLORADO, Deon Xander	L
14	SAPORNA, Sinmart	
15	DEL RIO, Charles Eugene	
19	VELASCO, Josue III	
	LONTOC, Emil	HC

Mapúa Cardinals
No.	Name	Position
1	SANADO, Peter Anthony	
3	MAGLINTE, Neil	
4	HIZON, John Arvic	
5	DELA PAZ, Joaquin Carlos	
6	BASAS, Anthony	
7	DAMA, Patrick John	
8	NAVAS, Angelbert	
9	PULGA, Miguel	
10	SANTOS, Jeremy	L
11	PAGULONG, Alfredo	
13	SAN ANDRES, John Benedict	
14	SILVA, John Evan	L
15	HIZON, Raje Emmanuel (c)	
18	TABIOS, Karl	
	DOLOIRAS, Paul John	HC

San Beda Red Lions
No.	Name	Position
1	ALIBAYAN, Jeremy	
2	GUNDRAN, Miguel Cyrus	
3	ESTAVILLO, John Lester	
6	LOPEZ, Jerome	
7	HEATH, Prince Wilson	L
8	LOPEZ, Fernando	
9	ULIBAS JR, Ferdinand	
10	CALAYAG, Lorenz	
12	TIBAY, Jeremiah	L
13	LOSA, Jeffrey	
14	NURSIDDIK, Abdurasad	
15	LAPURGA, Melver (c)	
17	GARCIA, Aries Keanu	
18	DECANO, Mark Joel	
	DELA CRUZ, Ariel	HC

San Sebastian Stags
No.	Name	Position
2	ANDRADE, Jerome	L
3	LANA, Julius James	
4	HONRA, Reynald David	
5	RAMIREZ, Dominique	
6	ABULENCIA, Angelo	
8	DE GUZMAN, Mel Clarence	
9	LIM, John Mark	
11	VELASQUEZ JR, Erwin	
13	BUNSUAN, Nathalian	
14	FERRER, Aldre Mori	S
15	TEODONES JR, Romeo	L
16	PAMITTAN, Robbie	
17	EUSEBIO, Timothy John (c)	
19	SANCHEZ, Kince	
	LABUGA, Norvie	HC

Perpetual Altas
No.	Name	Position
1	ENARCISO, John Christian	
2	MUHALI, Ridzuan	
4	ATENTAR, Jeric	L
5	CASANA, Gabriel Ej	
6	ANDRADE, Kc	
7	RAMIREZ, Louie	
8	BAGGAYAN, John Rick	
9	SERENO, Aljoe Augustine	
10	ABDULLA, Awie	
12	MALINIS, Kennry	
13	ROSALES, Ronniel (c)	
17	ZARENO, Joshua	
18	PEPITO, John Philip	L
19	AUSTRIA, Hero	
	ACAYLAR, Sinfronio	HC

Legend
S	Setter
MB	Middle Blocker
OH	Outside Hitter
OP	Opposite Hitter
L	Libero
(c)	Team Captain
HC	Head coach

=== Elimination round ===
==== Team standings ====
Pos	Team	Pld	W	L	Pts	SW	SL	SR	SPW	SPL	SPR	Qualification
1	Perpetual Altas	9	9	0	27	27	2	13.500	736	566	1.300	Advance to the Finals
2	EAC Generals	9	7	2	22	23	9	2.556	771	668	1.154	Proceed to stepladder round 1
3	Arellano Chiefs (H)	8	6	2	16	20	12	1.667	728	695	1.047	Proceed to stepladder round 2
4	Benilde Blazers	7	5	2	14	16	9	1.778	562	535	1.050	Proceed to stepladder round 2
5	San Beda Red Lions	8	4	4	13	15	14	1.071	644	711	0.906	
6	Mapúa Cardinals	8	4	4	12	15	14	1.071	640	675	0.948	
7	Letran Knights	8	2	6	6	8	19	0.421	544	643	0.846	
8	Lyceum Pirates	8	2	6	5	7	21	0.333	604	665	0.908	
9	San Sebastian Stags	8	1	7	4	6	21	0.286	568	635	0.894	
10	JRU Heavy Bombers	9	1	8	4	8	24	0.333	677	777	0.871	

Updated to match(es) played on February 11, 2020. Source: ABS-CBN Sports
Rules for classification: 1) Number of wins; 2) if tied for #2 or #4, one-game playoff; 3) head-to-head record; 4) match points; 5) sets ratio; 6) points ratio
(H) Host

Point system:

3 points = win match in 3 or 4 sets
2 points = win match in 5 sets
1 point = lose match in 5 sets
0 point = lose match in 3 or 4 sets

==== Match-up results ====
Team ╲ Game	1	2	3	4	5	6	7	8	9
Arellano	Lyceum school colors	Mapua school colors	JRU school colors	SSC-R school colors	San Beda school colors	UPHD school colors	Letran school colors	EAC school colors	CSB school colors
Letran	EAC school colors	CSB school colors	San Beda school colors	Mapua school colors	Lyceum school colors	Arellano school colors	JRU school colors	UPHD school colors	SSC-R school colors
Benilde	UPHD school colors	Lyceum school colors	Letran school colors	EAC school colors	SSC-R school colors	San Beda school colors	JRU school colors	Mapua school colors	Arellano school colors
EAC	Letran school colors	Mapua school colors	CSB school colors	Lyceum school colors	JRU school colors	San Beda school colors	SSC-R school colors	UPHD school colors	Arellano school colors
JRU	SSC-R school colors	San Beda school colors	Arellano school colors	Lyceum school colors	UPHD school colors	EAC school colors	Mapua school colors	CSB school colors	Letran school colors
Lyceum	Arellano school colors	CSB school colors	UPHD school colors	JRU school colors	EAC school colors	Letran school colors	Mapua school colors	SSC-R school colors	San Beda school colors
Mapúa	Arellano school colors	EAC school colors	UPHD school colors	Letran school colors	SSC-R school colors	JRU school colors	Lyceum school colors	San Beda school colors	CSB school colors
San Beda	JRU school colors	SSC-R school colors	Letran school colors	Arellano school colors	CSB school colors	EAC school colors	UPHD school colors	Mapua school colors	Lyceum school colors
San Sebastian	JRU school colors	UPHD school colors	San Beda school colors	Arellano school colors	CSB school colors	Mapua school colors	EAC school colors	Lyceum school colors	Letran school colors
Perpetual	CSB school colors	SSC-R school colors	Lyceum school colors	Mapua school colors	JRU school colors	Arellano school colors	San Beda school colors	EAC school colors	Letran school colors

= Win; = Loss; = Match cancelled

Date	Time		Score		Set 1	Set 2	Set 3	Set 4	Set 5	Total	Report
10 Jan	09:30	Arellano Chiefs	3–0	Lyceum Pirates	25–22	25–14	25–22	–	–	75–58	
10 Jan	15:30	Perpetual Altas	3–0	Benilde Blazers	25–17	25–15	25–19	–	–	75–51	
16 Jan	10:00	JRU Heavy Bombers	3–0	San Sebastian Stags	25–14	27–25	25–14	–	–	77–53	
16 Jan	15:30	Mapúa Cardinals	1–3	Arellano Chiefs	24–26	19–25	25–22	23–25	–	91–98	
17 Jan	10:00	Letran Knights	0–3	EAC Generals	19–25	18–25	22–25	–	–	59–75	
17 Jan	15:30	Lyceum Pirates	0–3	Benilde Blazers	21–25	23–25	18–25	–	–	62–75	
18 Jan	10:00	San Sebastian Stags	0–3	Perpetual Altas	18–25	15–25	21–25	–	–	54–75	
18 Jan	15:30	JRU Heavy Bombers	1–3	San Beda Red Lions	19–25	26–24	20–25	21–25	–	86–99	
20 Jan	10:00	Benilde Blazers	3–0	Letran Knights	25–21	25–16	25–22	–	–	75–59	
20 Jan	15:30	EAC Generals	3–1	Mapúa Cardinals	21–25	25–16	25–20	25–21	–	96–82	
21 Jan	10:00	Perpetual Altas	3–0	Lyceum Pirates	25–22	33–31	25–20	–	–	83–73	
21 Jan	15:30	San Beda Red Lions	0–3	San Sebastian Stags	22–25	20–25	35–37	–	–	77–87	
23 Jan	10:00	JRU Heavy Bombers	1–3	Arellano Chiefs	19–25	23–25	25–22	16–25	–	83–97	
23 Jan	15:30	EAC Generals	3–1	Benilde Blazers	25–15	25–21	26–28	25–17	–	101–81	
24 Jan	10:00	Letran Knights	1–3	San Beda Red Lions	16–25	25–23	15–25	20–25	–	76–98	
24 Jan	15:30	Mapúa Cardinals	1–3	Perpetual Altas	15–25	17–25	25–20	15–25	–	72–95	
25 Jan	10:00	Arellano Chiefs	3–2	San Sebastian Stags	25–23	16–25	25–27	25–19	16–14	107–108	
25 Jan	15:30	Lyceum Pirates	3–2	JRU Heavy Bombers	25–23	25–21	19–25	23–25	–	92–94	
27 Jan	10:00	Arellano Chiefs	1–3	San Beda Red Lions	15–25	19–25	25–23	16–25	–	75–98	
27 Jan	15:30	JRU Heavy Bombers	0–3	Perpetual Altas	14–25	23–25	7–25	–	–	44–75	
28 Jan	10:00	Lyceum Pirates	0–3	EAC Generals	20–25	23–25	17–25	–	–	60–75	
28 Jan	15:30	San Sebastian Stags	0–3	Benilde Blazers	22–25	16–25	22–25	–	–	60–75	
29 Jan	10:00	Perpetual Altas	1–3	Arellano Chiefs	28–26	23–25	25–21	25–19	–	101–91	
29 Jan	15:30	Letran Knights	1–3	Mapúa Cardinals	18–25	19–25	28–26	23–25	–	88–101	
30 Jan	10:00	Benilde Blazers	3–2	San Beda Red Lions	23–25	25–17	27–25	19–25	15–9	109–101	
30 Jan	15:30	EAC Generals	3–0	JRU Heavy Bombers	25–22	25–19	25–20	–	–	75–61	
31 Jan	10:00	Letran Knights	3–1	Lyceum Pirates	19–25	25–23	25–18	25–22	–	94–88	
31 Jan	15:30	Mapúa Cardinals	3–0	San Sebastian Stags	25–13	25–23	25–18	–	–	75–54	
03 Feb	10:00	San Beda Red Lions	1–3	EAC Generals	22–25	20–25	25–18	19–25	–	86–93	
03 Feb	15:30	JRU Heavy Bombers	1–3	Mapúa Cardinals	22–25	17–25	23–25	15–25	–	77–100	
04 Feb	10:00	Arellano Chiefs	3–0	Letran Knights	25–22	25–12	25–17	–	–	75–51	
06 Feb	10:00	Mapúa Cardinals	3–0	Lyceum Pirates	27–25	25–18	25–18	–	–	77–61	
06 Feb	15:30	EAC Generals	3–0	San Sebastian Stags	25–20	25–12	25–20	–	–	75–52	
07 Feb	10:00	Benilde Blazers	3–1	JRU Heavy Bombers	25–20	21–25	25–12	25–20	–	96–77	
07 Feb	15:30	Perpetual Altas	3–0	San Beda Red Lions	25–21	25–15	25–22	–	–	75–58	
10 Feb	10:00	Perpetual Altas	3–0	EAC Generals	25–23	29–27	28–26	–	–	82–76	
10 Feb	15:30	JRU Heavy Bombers	0–3	Letran Knights	21–25	17–25	17–25	–	–	55–75	
11 Feb	10:00	San Sebastian Stags	1–3	Lyceum Pirates	14–25	23–25	25–20	17–25	–	79–95	
11 Feb	15:30	San Beda Red Lions	3–0	Mapúa Cardinals	25–22	25–20	25–20	–	–	75–62	
13 Feb	10:00	Arellano Chiefs	3–2	EAC Generals	22–25	23–25	25–22	25–21	15–12	110–105	
13 Feb	15:30	Perpetual Altas	3–0	Letran Knights	25–14	25–15	25–18	–	–	75–47	
Cancelled	10:00	San Beda Red Lions	–	Lyceum Pirates	–	–	–	–	–	0–0	
Cancelled	15:30	Benilde Blazers	–	Mapúa Cardinals	–	–	–	–	–	0–0	
Cancelled	10:00	San Sebastian Stags	–	Letran Knights	–	–	–	–	–	0–0	
Cancelled	15:30	Arellano Chiefs	–	Benilde Blazers	–	–	–	–	–	0–0	

==== Scores ====
Teams	AU	CSJL	DLS-CSB	EAC	JRU	LPU	MU	SBU	SSC-R	UPHSD
Arellano Chiefs	—	3–0	0–0	3–2	3–1	3–0	3–1	1–3	3–2	1–3
Letran Knights	—	—	0–3	0–3	3–0	3–1	1–3	1–3	0–0	0–3
Benilde Blazers	—	—	—	1–3	3–1	3–0	0–0	3–2	3–0	0–3
EAC Generals	—	—	—	—	3–0	3–0	3–1	3–1	3–0	0–3
JRU Heavy Bombers	—	—	—	—	—	2–3	1–3	1–3	3–0	0–3
Lyceum Pirates	—	—	—	—	—	—	0–3	0–0	3–1	0–3
Mapúa Cardinals	—	—	—	—	—	—	—	0–3	0–3	1–3
San Beda Red Lions	—	—	—	—	—	—	—	—	0–3	0–3
San Sebastian Stags	—	—	—	—	—	—	—	—	—	0–3
Perpetual Altas	—	—	—	—	—	—	—	—	—	—

Updated to match(es) played on February 11, 2020. Source: ABS-CBN Sports
Legend: Blue = left column team win; Red = top row team win.

== Women's tournament ==
=== Team line-up ===
Arellano Lady Chiefs
No.	Name	Position
1	PECANA, Lorraine	
2	DINO, Charmina	
3	BELLO, Princess	
5	CUENCA, Cherry Mae	L
6	VERUTIAO, Sarah Princess (c)	
7	FLORES, Faye Ann Marie	L
9	SASUMAN, Nicole Victoria	
10	PARALEJAS, Donnalyn	
12	EBUEN, Necole	
13	AROCHA, Regine Anne	
14	JUANICH, Mikaela	
15	DONATO, Carla Amaina	
16	SAN GREGORIO, Alyana Marie	
17	ORTIZ, Jacqueline	
	JAVIER, Roberto	HC

Letran Lady Knights
No.	Name	Position
1	SANTOS, Erica Mae	L
2	CASTRO, Julienne	
3	SIMBORIO, Marie Charlmagne (c)	
4	SORIANO, Rio Trina	
5	DELA CRUZ, Kathleen	
6	ANGELES, Julia	L
7	CUNADA, Chamberlaine	
9	URMENETA, Shereena	
11	OHYA, Dane Iam	
12	MIRANDA, Kristine Joy	
16	MUSNGI, Edna Ann	
17	MONTEAGUDO, Khryss Anne	
18	MELENDRES, Daisy	
19	TAPANG, Lea Rizel	
	INOFERIO, Michael	HC

Benilde Lady Blazers
No.	Name	Position
1	LAI, Jewel (c)	S
2	PABLO, Marites	
3	GAMIT, Michelle	
4	VENTURA, Diane	
5	UMALI, Chelsea	
7	MIRANDA, Kaila	
8	MONDONEDO, Cloanne	
9	PASCUAL, Gayle	
10	GO, Mycah	
11	LIM, Christine Danielle	L
13	GENTAPA, Jade	
14	TUMANG, Jeanelle	
15	ABRIAM, Klarisa	
16	DAGUIL, Arianne	L
	YEE, Jerry	HC

EAC Lady Generals
No.	Name	Position
1	MANGARING, Jayrah	L
2	GALLARDEZ, Dhariane Andreane	
3	CASTILLO, Hyacinth Jade	
4	REYES, Krizzia	
5	VILLENA, Jamaica	
6	TOBIAS, Rednaxela	
7	OMAPAS, Jennifer	
8	CABRERA, Jan Carl Lauren (c)	
9	TESARA, Kristine Mara	
11	FORMENTO, Anne Jelyn	
12	CANCIO, Kristine Dominique	
13	ALMAZAN, Catherine	
14	DOTE, Sofia Joyce	L
	PALMERO, Rodrigo	HC

JRU Lady Bombers
No.	Name	Position
1	BAUTISTA, Angel Rose	L
3	BAUTISTA, Aubry	
4	EGERA, Jonazel Lyka	
5	MELGAR, Renesa	
6	JASARENO, Karyla Rafaella	
7	NIEGOS, Sydney Mae	
8	ROSE, Riza	
9	EBUENGA, Christina Kassandra	
10	LAURENTE, Jerry Lyn	
11	VILLANUEVA, Danica	
12	RUIZ, Mary May	
14	VERZOSA, Dolly Grace (c)	
15	BODIONGAN, Angelie	
16	AQUINO, Angelica Mae	L
	TIOSECO, Ma. Anna	HC

Lyceum Lady Pirates
No.	Name	Position
1	PUZON, Venice	
2	ACUNA, Jacquline	
3	MANACAP, Maricar	
4	STA MARIA, Lois	
5	MAPULA, Melienie	
6	GALENO, Carol Joy	L
7	TOCA, Franchesca	
9	WANTA, Ciarnelle (c)	
10	RAFAEL, Alexandra	
11	BELARO, Camille	L
12	DOGUNA, Joan	
14	SEVILLA, Monica Jane	
16	DAHAB, Zonxi	
17	ONOFRE, Mary Joy	
	LONTOC, Emiliano	HC

Mapúa Lady Cardinals
No.	Name	Position
1	BABIERA, Princess Jolina	
2	FERNANDEZ, Jonina Mae	
3	MAGALLANES, Alissa (c)	
4	BATAC, Cherie	
5	ORTEGA, Wellamae	L
6	BOLANDRINA, Leslie	
7	BARIAS, Lorraine	
8	ALVARADO, Hanna Wendy Lips	L
10	ESPIRITU, Ayena Gwen	
11	MAGUNDAYAO, Angeline Marie	
12	SY, Janela Nicole	
14	GAUDAN, Carla Jean	
16	CRUZ, Allyana Louise	
18	OBENITA, Kate Michelle	
	ESTEBAN, Clarence	HC

San Beda Red Lionesses
No.	Name	Position
1	MATIAS, Lynne Robyn	
2	TANNAGAN, China	
3	MANZANO, Kimberly Grace	
5	RACRAQUIN, Daryl Sigrid	L
7	TAYAG, Maxinne Joyce	
8	BUNO, Justin Marie	L
9	VIRAY, Maria Nieza	
13	PARAS, Trisha Mae	
14	SALANGSANG, Francesca Louise	
15	CENZON, Patricia Ysabel	
16	VIRAY Maria Jeziela	
17	DIOSO, Kyla Jeremae	
18	RACRAQUIN, Aurea Francesca (c)	
22	LAPID, Justine	
	GAVINO JR, Nemesio	HC

San Sebastian Lady Stags
No.	Name	Position
2	CANETE, Reyann	
3	BERMILLO, Jewelle	L
4	CONSUEGRA, Quenne	
5	REQUIERME, Shannai Shane (c)	
6	TAN, Roxanne	L
7	CAPUTOLAN, Alla Mae	
8	MEDENILLA, Zemineth Pearl	
9	SISON, Alexia Vea	
10	TAN, Kamille Josephine Amaka	
12	DELA CRUZ, Christine	
13	CARREON, Jamille Veronica	
14	ORDONA, Bianca	
16	SAN JUAN, Alyssa	
19	BIGATA, Sherielyn	
	LABUGA, Norvie	HC

Perpetual Lady Altas
No.	Name	Position
1	TRIPOLI, Bianca	
2	SANGALANG, Allysa	L
4	SALIMBACOD, Daisy	
6	PADUA, Janine	
7	DAYAO, Beatrice	L
8	ROSAL, Jhona	
10	CORDERO, Krisha	
11	ARCELLANA, Kathrina	
12	UMANDAL, Shyra	
14	SUICO, Hannah	
15	ALDEA, Razel	
16	SCOTT, Charina	
17	GAVIOLA, Jenny (c)	
20	PERSA, Dana	
	CARINO, Michael	HC

Legend
S	Setter
MB	Middle Blocker
OH	Outside Hitter
OP	Opposite Hitter
L	Libero
(c)	Team Captain
HC	Head coach

=== Elimination round ===
==== Team standings ====
Pos	Team	Pld	W	L	Pts	SW	SL	SR	SPW	SPL	SPR	Qualification
1	Benilde Lady Blazers	7	7	0	20	21	4	5.250	593	477	1.243	Twice-to-beat in the semifinals
2	Arellano Lady Chiefs (H)	8	7	1	22	23	5	4.600	603	487	1.238	Twice-to-beat in the semifinals
3	San Beda Red Lionesses	8	6	2	17	19	9	2.111	662	545	1.215	Twice-to-win in the semifinals
4	Perpetual Lady Altas	9	6	3	16	21	17	1.235	846	782	1.082	Twice-to-win in the semifinals
5	Letran Lady Knights	8	4	4	10	15	17	0.882	670	710	0.944	
6	JRU Lady Bombers	9	4	5	12	14	18	0.778	677	709	0.955	
7	Lyceum Lady Pirates	8	3	5	12	16	15	1.067	693	663	1.045	
8	San Sebastian Lady Stags	8	2	6	8	12	19	0.632	617	707	0.873	
9	Mapúa Lady Cardinals	8	1	7	4	5	22	0.227	504	665	0.758	
10	EAC Lady Generals	9	1	8	2	6	26	0.231	569	689	0.826	

Updated to match(es) played on February 11, 2020. Source: ABS-CBN Sports
Rules for classification: 1) Number of wins; 2) if tied for #2 or #4, one-game playoff; 3) head-to-head record; 4) match points; 5) sets ratio; 6) points ratio
(H) Host

Point system:

3 points = win match in 3 or 4 sets
2 points = win match in 5 sets
1 point = lose match in 5 sets
0 point = lose match in 3 or 4 sets

==== Match-up results ====
Team ╲ Game	1	2	3	4	5	6	7	8	9
Arellano	Lyceum school colors	Mapua school colors	JRU school colors	SSC-R school colors	San Beda school colors	UPHD school colors	Letran school colors	EAC school colors	CSB school colors
Letran	EAC school colors	CSB school colors	San Beda school colors	Mapua school colors	Lyceum school colors	Arellano school colors	JRU school colors	UPHD school colors	SSC-R school colors
Benilde	UPHD school colors	Lyceum school colors	Letran school colors	EAC school colors	SSC-R school colors	San Beda school colors	JRU school colors	Mapua school colors	Arellano school colors
EAC	Letran school colors	Mapua school colors	CSB school colors	Lyceum school colors	JRU school colors	San Beda school colors	SSC-R school colors	UPHD school colors	Arellano school colors
JRU	SSC-R school colors	San Beda school colors	Arellano school colors	Lyceum school colors	UPHD school colors	EAC school colors	Mapua school colors	CSB school colors	Letran school colors
Lyceum	Arellano school colors	CSB school colors	UPHD school colors	JRU school colors	EAC school colors	Letran school colors	Mapua school colors	SSC-R school colors	San Beda school colors
Mapúa	Arellano school colors	EAC school colors	UPHD school colors	Letran school colors	SSC-R school colors	JRU school colors	Lyceum school colors	San Beda school colors	CSB school colors
San Beda	JRU school colors	SSC-R school colors	Letran school colors	Arellano school colors	CSB school colors	EAC school colors	UPHD school colors	Mapua school colors	Lyceum school colors
San Sebastian	JRU school colors	UPHD school colors	San Beda school colors	Arellano school colors	CSB school colors	Mapua school colors	EAC school colors	Lyceum school colors	Letran school colors
Perpetual	CSB school colors	SSC-R school colors	Lyceum school colors	Mapua school colors	JRU school colors	Arellano school colors	San Beda school colors	EAC school colors	Letran school colors

= Win; = Loss; = Match cancelled

Date	Time		Score		Set 1	Set 2	Set 3	Set 4	Set 5	Total	Report
10 Jan	12:00	Arellano Lady Chiefs	3–0	Lyceum Lady Pirates	27–25	25–16	25–17	–	–	77–58	
10 Jan	14:00	Perpetual Lady Altas	1–3	Benilde Lady Blazers	17–25	25–14	17–25	20–25	–	79–89	
16 Jan	12:00	JRU Lady Bombers	3–2	San Sebastian Lady Stags	22–25	25–19	21–25	25–21	15–8	108–98	
16 Jan	14:00	Mapúa Lady Cardinals	0–3	Arellano Lady Chiefs	13–25	20–25	12–25	–	–	45–75	
17 Jan	12:00	Letran Lady Knights	3–1	EAC Lady Generals	22–25	25–10	25–18	25–13	–	97–66	
17 Jan	14:00	Lyceum Lady Pirates	2–3	Benilde Lady Blazers	25–23	23–25	25–23	18–25	7–15	98–111	
18 Jan	12:00	San Sebastian Lady Stags	1–3	Perpetual Lady Altas	31–29	13–25	20–25	20–25	–	84–104	
18 Jan	14:00	JRU Lady Bombers	2–3	San Beda Red Lionesses	17–25	25–22	27–25	14–25	6–15	89–112	
20 Jan	12:00	Benilde Lady Blazers	3–0	Letran Lady Knights	25–20	25–18	25–15	–	–	75–53	
20 Jan	14:00	EAC Lady Generals	1–3	Mapúa Lady Cardinals	25–21	23–25	23–25	22–25	–	93–96	
21 Jan	12:00	Perpetual Lady Altas	3–2	Lyceum Lady Pirates	25–27	25–23	26–24	13–25	17–15	106–114	
21 Jan	14:00	San Beda Red Lionesses	3–0	San Sebastian Lady Stags	25–13	25–9	25–21	–	–	75–43	
23 Jan	12:00	JRU Lady Bombers	0–3	Arellano Lady Chiefs	19–25	16–25	17–25	–	–	52–75	
23 Jan	14:00	EAC Lady Generals	0–3	Benilde Lady Blazers	20–25	21–25	17–25	–	–	58–75	
24 Jan	12:00	Letran Lady Knights	1–3	San Beda Red Lionesses	26–24	19–25	17–25	17–25	–	79–99	
24 Jan	14:00	Mapúa Lady Cardinals	2–3	Perpetual Lady Altas	25–20	26–24	18–25	12–25	6–15	87–109	
25 Jan	12:00	Arellano Lady Chiefs	3–1	San Sebastian Lady Stags	25–17	25–18	25–27	25–13	–	100–75	
25 Jan	14:00	Lyceum Lady Pirates	3–0	JRU Lady Bombers	25–23	25–19	25–23	–	–	75–65	
27 Jan	12:00	Arellano Lady Chiefs	3–0	San Beda Red Lionesses	25–20	25–21	25–22	–	–	75–63	
27 Jan	14:00	JRU Lady Bombers	0–3	Perpetual Lady Altas	19–25	20–25	20–25	–	–	59–75	
28 Jan	12:00	Lyceum Lady Pirates	3–0	EAC Lady Generals	25–18	25–17	25–15	–	–	75–50	
28 Jan	14:00	San Sebastian Lady Stags	0–3	Benilde Lady Blazers	18–25	13–25	17–25	–	–	48–75	
29 Jan	12:00	Perpetual Lady Altas	3–2	Arellano Lady Chiefs	22–25	22–25	25–22	25–12	16–14	110–98	
29 Jan	14:00	Letran Lady Knights	3–0	Mapúa Lady Cardinals	27–25	25–14	25–16	–	–	77–55	
30 Jan	12:00	Benilde Lady Blazers	3–1	San Beda Red Lionesses	17–25	25–18	25–22	25–22	–	92–87	
30 Jan	14:00	EAC Lady Generals	0–3	JRU Lady Bombers	22–25	17–25	19–25	–	–	58–75	
31 Jan	12:00	Letran Lady Knights	3–2	Lyceum Lady Pirates	26–28	27–25	16–25	25–19	16–14	110–111	
31 Jan	14:00	Mapúa Lady Cardinals	0–3	San Sebastian Lady Stags	18–25	20–25	20–25	–	–	58–75	
03 Feb	12:00	San Beda Red Lionesses	3–0	EAC Lady Generals	25–15	25–16	27–25	–	–	77–56	
03 Feb	14:00	JRU Lady Bombers	3–0	Mapúa Lady Cardinals	25–18	25–18	31–29	–	–	81–65	
04 Feb	12:00	Arellano Lady Chiefs	3–1	Letran Lady Knights	25–14	26–28	25–19	25–16	–	101–77	
06 Feb	12:00	Mapúa Lady Cardinals	0–3	Lyceum Lady Pirates	21–25	11–25	16–25	–	–	48–75	
06 Feb	14:00	EAC Lady Generals	3–2	San Sebastian Lady Stags	21–25	25–23	22–25	25–18	15–8	108–99	
07 Feb	12:00	Benilde Lady Blazers	3–0	JRU Lady Bombers	25–22	25–13	25–20	–	–	75–55	
07 Feb	14:00	Perpetual Lady Altas	0–3	San Beda Red Lionesses	20–25	19–25	16–25	–	–	55–75	
10 Feb	12:00	Perpetual Lady Altas	3–1	EAC Lady Generals	20–25	25–17	25–21	25–17	–	95–80	
10 Feb	14:00	JRU Lady Bombers	3–1	Letran Lady Knights	25–17	18–25	25–21	25–13	–	93–76	
11 Feb	12:00	San Sebastian Lady Stags	3–1	Lyceum Lady Pirates	25–20	25–18	20–25	25–16	–	95–79	
11 Feb	14:00	San Beda Red Lionesses	3–0	Mapúa Lady Cardinals	25–19	25–17	25–19	–	–	75–55	
13 Feb	12:00	Arellano Lady Chiefs	3–0	EAC Lady Generals	25–15	25–14	25–20	–	–	75–49	
13 Feb	14:00	Perpetual Lady Altas	2–3	Letran Lady Knights	22–25	20–25	25–18	25–16	15–17	107–101	
Cancelled	12:00	San Beda Red Lionesses	–	Lyceum Lady Pirates	–	–	–	–	–	0–0	
Cancelled	14:00	Benilde Lady Blazers	–	Mapúa Lady Cardinals	–	–	–	–	–	0–0	
Cancelled	12:00	San Sebastian Lady Stags	–	Letran Lady Knights	–	–	–	–	–	0–0	
Cancelled	14:00	Arellano Lady Chiefs	–	Benilde Lady Blazers	–	–	–	–	–	0–0	

==== Scores ====
Teams	AU	CSJL	DLS-CSB	EAC	JRU	LPU	MU	SBU	SSC-R	UPHSD
Arellano Lady Chiefs	—	3–1	0–0	3–0	3–0	3–0	3–0	3–0	3–1	2–3
Letran Lady Knights	—	—	0–3	3–1	1–3	3–2	3–0	1–3	0–0	3–2
Benilde Lady Blazers	—	—	—	3–0	3–0	3–2	0–0	3–1	3–0	3–1
EAC Lady Generals	—	—	—	—	0–3	0–3	1–3	0–3	3–2	1–3
JRU Lady Bombers	—	—	—	—	—	0–3	3–0	2–3	3–2	0–3
Lyceum Lady Pirates	—	—	—	—	—	—	3–0	0–0	1–3	2–3
Mapúa Lady Cardinals	—	—	—	—	—	—	—	0–3	0–3	2–3
San Beda Red Lionesses	—	—	—	—	—	—	—	—	3–0	3–0
San Sebastian Lady Stags	—	—	—	—	—	—	—	—	—	1–3
Perpetual Lady Altas	—	—	—	—	—	—	—	—	—	—

Updated to match(es) played on February 11, 2020. Source: ABS-CBN Sports
Legend: Blue = left column team win; Red = top row team win.

== Boys' tournament ==
=== Team line-up ===
Arellano Braves
No.	Name	Position
1	DOMINGO, Herald	
2	SANTIAGO, Clarence	
3	PERALTA, Christian Dalle	
4	OSABEL, Ervin Patrick	
5	QUINTAN, Emmanuel	L
6	MAMORA, Matthew Andrei	
7	QUERUBIN, Ronan Theird	L
9	LAGANDO, Angelo	
10	DELOS SANTOS, James Paul	
11	EUSEBIO, Eri Klint (c)	
13	MONTALBAN, Vincent	
14	GOMEZ, Oriz Ranz	
15	BUHAY, Jiacomo Ken	
16	TAGUIBOLOS, Rwenzmel	
	ESTACIO, Richard	HC

Letran Squires
No.	Name	Position
##		
##		
##		
##		
##		
##		
##		
##		
##		
##		
##		
##		
##	(c)	
##		
	ESQUIBEL, Brian	HC

La Salle Green Hills Greenies
No.	Name	Position
##		
##		
##		
##		
##		
##		
##		
##		
##		
##		
##		
##		
##	(c)	
##		
	DE CASTRO, Joseph	HC

EAC–ICA Brigadiers
No.	Name	Position
##		
##		
##		
##		
##		
##		
##		
##		
##		
##		
##		
##		
##	(c)	
##		
	coach	HC

JRU Light Bombers
No.	Name	Position
2	ARINGO, Andrew James	
3	BONDOC, Adrian	L
4	BAUTISTA, Louise Maru	
5	LAZADA, Homer	
6	VILLANUEVA, Matthew Azriel Joshua	
7	CABRERA, Kenneth Justine	
8	JANABAN, Paul Rustan	
9	CAOYONAN, John Denber	
10	GIVERA, Edilberto Jr (c)	
11	RELAVO, Keyl Andrei	
14	RIVERA, Ric Jr	
15	GRACIA, John Maynard	L
	ENANOD, Peter	HC

Lyceum Junior Pirates
No.	Name	Position
1	MOJICA, Craig Yuuki	
2	PABITON, Yoj Yirev	
3	PABITON, Jan Vernard	
4	CALINGASAN, Dannel	
5	GARCIA, Jaztine	
6	PALAN, Jansen	
7	ACEDERA, Albert (c)	
8	BENCITO, Sean Lewis	
9	RODRIGUEZ, Joshua Jamiel	
10	DE LIMA, Eryn Maui	L
11	GRANADA, Dean Griffith	
12	POLIS, Earl Jericson	
14	GIRON, Rainiel	
16	GASPILLO, Jeff	L
	COLIMA, Reynaldo	HC

Mapúa Red Robins
No.	Name	Position
1	MARTIN, Marc Dominic	
4	MACEO, Renz Paolo	
5	BELTRAN, Nathaniel	L
7	AREVALO, Sebastian Noel	
8	BARBA, Juancho Joaquin	
9	BELANDRES, Jerrold	
10	CHAN, Justin Robin (c)	
11	ALABAN, Laurence Clair	
12	SARMIENTO, Lloyd Jon	
13	VILLEGAS, Lui Rey	
14	CLARA JR, Rogelio	L
15	CO ONG, Jervis Luther	
	RICO, Romnick	HC

San Beda Red Cubs
No.	Name	Position
##		
##		
##	PASAYLOON, Zandro	
##		
##		
##		
##		
##		
##		
##		
##		
##		
##	(c)	
##		
	GAVINO JR, Nemesio	HC

San Sebastian Staglets
No.	Name	Position
1	ANTONIO, Renzel	
2	MORFE, Erano	
3	NABOR, Jerald	
4	LASTIMOSA, Karl (c)	
5	VITA, Noah	L
6	AGUILAR, Richmond	
7	RUBIN, Jessie	
8	GIANAN, Alexander	
9	LEAL, Enzo	L
11	BARNUEVO, Louie	
12	ASUNIO, Gabriel	
14	CLARIN, Harvy Josh	
15	BELMONTE, Joshua	
	LABUGA, Norvie	HC

Perpetual Junior Altas
No.	Name	Position
1	PILAPIL, Jayson	
2	ENARCISO, John Stephen	
3	POZAS, Joshua	
4	ATENDIDO, Preece Mori	
5	MARATA, Von	
6	CARITATIVO, Sherwin	
7	GABITO, Dominique	
8	COGUIMBAL, Mark Leo	
9	KAMPTON, Noel Michael	
10	GERMONO, Derick Gabriel	
11	ROSOS, Kirth Patrick (c)	
12	PARCE, Kharylle Rhoy	
15	HERNANDEZ, Michael Jonas	L
16	PRADO, John Michael	L
	RIETA, Sandy	HC

Legend
S	Setter
MB	Middle Blocker
OH	Outside Hitter
OP	Opposite Hitter
L	Libero
(c)	Team Captain
HC	Head coach

==== Team standings ====
Pos	Team	Pld	W	L	Pts	SW	SL	SR	SPW	SPL	SPR	Qualification
1	Arellano Braves (H)	7	7	0	19	21	5	4.200	611	492	1.242	Twice-to-beat in the semifinals
2	Perpetual Junior Altas	6	5	1	16	17	3	5.667	478	234	2.043	Twice-to-beat in the semifinals
3	EAC–ICA Brigadiers	7	5	2	16	18	8	2.250	615	522	1.178	Twice-to-win in the semifinals
4	San Beda Red Cubs	6	4	2	12	12	8	1.500	461	393	1.173	Twice-to-win in the semifinals
5	Letran Squires	6	4	2	11	13	8	1.625	503	440	1.143	
6	San Sebastian Staglets	7	4	3	10	13	13	1.000	540	527	1.025	
7	Lyceum Junior Pirates	7	3	4	10	12	13	0.923	554	559	0.991	
8	Mapúa Red Robins	7	1	6	5	9	18	0.500	566	629	0.900	
9	La Salle Green Hills Greenies	6	0	6	0	0	18	0.000	190	450	0.422	
10	JRU Light Bombers	7	0	7	0	0	21	0.000	365	533	0.685	

Updated to match(es) played on February 6, 2020. Source: ABS-CBN Sports
Rules for classification: 1) Number of wins; 2) if tied for #2 or #4, one-game playoff; 3) head-to-head record; 4) match points; 5) sets ratio; 6) points ratio
(H) Host

Point system:

3 points = win match in 3 or 4 sets
2 points = win match in 5 sets
1 point = lose match in 5 sets
0 point = lose match in 3 or 4 sets

==== Match-up results ====
Team ╲ Game	1	2	3	4	5	6	7	8	9
Arellano	Lyceum school colors	Mapua school colors	JRU school colors	SSC-R school colors	San Beda school colors	UPHD school colors	Letran school colors	CSB school colors	EAC school colors
Letran	EAC school colors	CSB school colors	San Beda school colors	Mapua school colors	Lyceum school colors	Arellano school colors	JRU school colors	SSC-R school colors	UPHD school colors
EAC–ICA	Letran school colors	Mapua school colors	CSB school colors	Lyceum school colors	JRU school colors	San Beda school colors	SSC-R school colors	UPHD school colors	Arellano school colors
JRU	SSC-R school colors	San Beda school colors	Arellano school colors	Lyceum school colors	UPHD school colors	EAC school colors	Mapua school colors	CSB school colors	Letran school colors
LSGH	UPHD school colors	Lyceum school colors	Letran school colors	EAC school colors	SSC-R school colors	San Beda school colors	JRU school colors	Arellano school colors	Mapua school colors
LPU–C	Arellano school colors	CSB school colors	UPHD school colors	JRU school colors	EAC school colors	Letran school colors	Mapua school colors	SSC-R school colors	San Beda school colors
MHSS	Arellano school colors	EAC school colors	UPHD school colors	Letran school colors	SSC-R school colors	JRU school colors	Lyceum school colors	San Beda school colors	CSB school colors
SBU–R	JRU school colors	SSC-R school colors	Letran school colors	Arellano school colors	CSB school colors	EAC school colors	UPHD school colors	Mapua school colors	Lyceum school colors
San Sebastian	JRU school colors	UPHD school colors	San Beda school colors	Arellano school colors	CSB school colors	Mapua school colors	EAC school colors	Lyceum school colors	Letran school colors
Perpetual	CSB school colors	SSC-R school colors	Lyceum school colors	Mapua school colors	JRU school colors	Arellano school colors	San Beda school colors	EAC school colors	Letran school colors

= Win; = Loss; = Match cancelled

Date	Time		Score		Set 1	Set 2	Set 3	Set 4	Set 5	Total	Report
10 Jan	08:00	Arellano Braves	3–2	Lyceum Junior Pirates	25–19	23–25	26–24	20–25	15–12	109–105	
10 Jan	17:00	Perpetual Junior Altas	3–0	La Salle Green Hills Greenies	–	–	–	–	–	0–0	
16 Jan	08:30	JRU Light Bombers	0–3	San Sebastian Staglets	15–25	15–25	22–25	–	–	52–75	
16 Jan	17:00	Mapúa Red Robins	0–3	Arellano Braves	10–25	21–25	23–25	–	–	54–75	
17 Jan	08:30	Letran Squires	0–3	EAC–ICA Brigadiers	28–30	18–25	26–28	–	–	72–83	
17 Jan	17:00	Lyceum Junior Pirates	3–0	La Salle Green Hills Greenies	–	–	–	–	–	0–0	
18 Jan	08:30	San Sebastian Staglets	0–3	Perpetual Junior Altas	19–25	19–25	20–25	–	–	58–75	
18 Jan	17:00	JRU Light Bombers	0–3	San Beda Red Cubs	14–25	20–25	12–25	–	–	46–75	
20 Jan	08:30	La Salle Green Hills Greenies	0–3	Letran Squires	12–25	11–25	8–25	–	–	31–75	
20 Jan	17:00	EAC–ICA Brigadiers	3–0	Mapúa Red Robins	–	–	–	–	–	0–0	
21 Jan	08:30	Perpetual Junior Altas	3–0	Lyceum Junior Pirates	25–17	25–17	25–15	–	–	75–49	
21 Jan	17:00	San Beda Red Cubs	3–1	San Sebastian Staglets	25–13	20–25	25–16	25–23	–	95–77	
23 Jan	08:30	JRU Light Bombers	0–3	Arellano Braves	10–25	21–25	18–25	–	–	49–75	
23 Jan	17:00	EAC–ICA Brigadiers	0–3	La Salle Green Hills Greenies	10–25	11–25	13–25	–	–	34–75	
24 Jan	08:30	Letran Squires	3–0	San Beda Red Cubs	25–20	25–14	30–28	–	–	80–62	
24 Jan	17:00	Mapúa Red Robins	0–3	Perpetual Junior Altas	12–25	20–25	19–25	–	–	51–75	
25 Jan	08:30	Arellano Braves	3–0	San Sebastian Staglets	25–19	25–13	25–15	–	–	75–47	
25 Jan	17:00	Lyceum Junior Pirates	3–0	JRU Light Bombers	25–18	25–23	33–31	–	–	83–72	
27 Jan	08:30	Arellano Braves	3–0	San Beda Red Cubs	25–15	25–19	25–22	–	–	75–56	
27 Jan	17:00	JRU Light Bombers	0–3	Perpetual Junior Altas	12–25	14–25	21–25	–	–	47–75	
28 Jan	08:30	Lyceum Junior Pirates	1–3	EAC–ICA Brigadiers	18–25	28–26	22–25	17–25	–	85–101	
28 Jan	17:00	San Sebastian Staglets	0–3	La Salle Green Hills Greenies	25–11	25–9	25–14	–	–	75–34	
29 Jan	08:30	Perpetual Junior Altas	2–3	Arellano Braves	21–25	25–21	22–25	25–18	10–15	103–104	
29 Jan	17:00	Letran Squires	3–2	Mapúa Red Robins	34–36	25–22	25–15	24–26	15–12	123–111	
30 Jan	08:30	La Salle Green Hills Greenies	0–3	San Beda Red Cubs	7–25	16–25	8–25	–	–	31–75	
30 Jan	17:00	EAC–ICA Brigadiers	3–0	JRU Light Bombers	25–15	25–19	25–15	–	–	75–49	
31 Jan	08:30	Letran Squires	3–0	Lyceum Junior Pirates	25–16	25–21	25–18	–	–	75–55	
31 Jan	17:00	Mapúa Red Robins	2–3	San Sebastian Staglets	25–21	25–20	13–25	21–25	13–15	97–106	
03 Feb	08:30	San Beda Red Cubs	3–1	EAC–ICA Brigadiers	25–20	23–25	25–22	25–17	–	98–84	
03 Feb	17:00	JRU Light Bombers	0–3	Mapúa Red Robins	13–25	17–25	19–25	–	–	49–75	
04 Feb	08:30	Arellano Braves	3–1	Letran Squires	25–12	25–21	23–25	15–20	–	88–78	
06 Feb	08:30	Mapúa Red Robins	1–3	Lyceum Junior Pirates	26–28	21–25	26–24	23–25	–	96–102	
06 Feb	17:00	EAC–ICA Brigadiers	2–3	San Sebastian Staglets	25–18	21–25	17–25	25–19	11–15	99–102	
Cancelled	08:30	La Salle Green Hills Greenies	–	JRU Light Bombers	–	–	–	–	–	0–0	
Cancelled	17:00	Perpetual Junior Altas	–	San Beda Red Cubs	–	–	–	–	–	0–0	
Cancelled	08:30	Perpetual Junior Altas	–	EAC–ICA Brigadiers	–	–	–	–	–	0–0	
Cancelled	17:00	JRU Light Bombers	–	Letran Squires	–	–	–	–	–	0–0	
Cancelled	08:30	San Sebastian Staglets	–	Lyceum Junior Pirates	–	–	–	–	–	0–0	
Cancelled	17:00	San Beda Red Cubs	–	Mapúa Red Robins	–	–	–	–	–	0–0	
Cancelled	08:30	San Sebastian Staglets	–	Letran Squires	–	–	–	–	–	0–0	
Cancelled	17:00	Arellano Braves	–	La Salle Green Hills Greenies	–	–	–	–	–	0–0	
Cancelled	08:30	Arellano Braves	–	EAC–ICA Brigadiers	–	–	–	–	–	0–0	
Cancelled	17:00	La Salle Green Hills Greenies	–	Mapúa Red Robins	–	–	–	–	–	0–0	
Cancelled	08:30	San Beda Red Cubs	–	Lyceum Junior Pirates	–	–	–	–	–	0–0	
Cancelled	17:00	Perpetual Junior Altas	–	Letran Squires	–	–	–	–	–	0–0	

==== Scores ====
Teams	AU	CSJL	EAC–ICA	JRU	LSGH	LPU–C	MHSS	SBU–R	SSC–R	UPHSD
Arellano Braves	—	3–1	0–0	3–0	0–0	3–2	3–0	3–0	3–0	3–2
Letran Squires	—	—	0–3	0–0	3–0	3–0	3–2	3–0	0–0	0–0
EAC–ICA Brigadiers	—	—	—	3–0	3–0	3–1	0–0	1–3	2–3	0–0
JRU Light Bombers	—	—	—	—	0–0	0–3	0–3	0–3	0–3	0–3
La Salle Green Hills Greenies	—	—	—	—	—	0–0	0–0	0–3	0–3	0–0
Lyceum Junior Pirates	—	—	—	—	—	—	3–1	0–0	0–0	0–3
Mapúa Red Robins	—	—	—	—	—	—	—	0–0	2–3	0–3
San Beda Red Cubs	—	—	—	—	—	—	—	—	3–1	0–0
San Sebastian Staglets	—	—	—	—	—	—	—	—	—	0–3
Perpetual Junior Altas	—	—	—	—	—	—	—	—	—	—

Updated to match(es) played on unknown. Source: ABS-CBN Sports
Legend: Blue = left column team win; Red = top row team win.

== Girls' tournament ==
The girls tournament is introduced as a demonstration sport.

=== Elimination round ===
==== Team standings ====
Pos	Team	Pld	W	L	Pts	SW	SL	SR	SPW	SPL	SPR
1	Arellano Lady Braves (H)	3	3	0	9	9	0	MAX	226	103	2.194
2	Perpetual Junior Lady Altas	3	2	1	6	6	3	2.000	197	103	1.913
3	San Sebastian Lady Staglets	3	1	2	3	3	7	0.429	165	229	0.721
4	Lyceum Junior Lady Pirates	3	0	3	0	1	9	0.111	147	246	0.598

Updated to match(es) played on February 6, 2020. Source: ABS-CBN Sports
Rules for classification: 1) Number of wins; 2) if tied for #2 or #4, one-game playoff; 3) head-to-head record; 4) match points; 5) sets ratio; 6) points ratio
(H) Host

Point system:

3 points = win match in 3 or 4 sets
2 points = win match in 5 sets
1 point = lose match in 5 sets
0 point = lose match in 3 or 4 sets

==== Match-up results ====
Team ╲ Game	1	2	3
Arellano	Lyceum school colors	SSC-R school colors	UPHD school colors
LPU–C	Arellano school colors	UPHD school colors	SSC-R school colors
San Sebastian	UPHD school colors	Arellano school colors	Lyceum school colors
Perpetual	SSC-R school colors	Lyceum school colors	Arellano school colors

= Win; = Loss

Date	Time		Score		Set 1	Set 2	Set 3	Set 4	Set 5	Total	Report
22 Jan	–	Perpetual Junior Lady Altas	3–0	Lyceum Junior Lady Pirates	25–12	25–12	25–15	–	–	75–39	
22 Jan	–	Arellano Lady Braves	3–0	San Sebastian Lady Staglets	25–13	25–9	25–5	–	–	75–27	
01 Feb	–	San Sebastian Lady Staglets	3–1	Lyceum Junior Lady Pirates	25–21	21–25	25–14	25–19	–	96–79	
01 Feb	–	Arellano Lady Braves	3–0	Perpetual Junior Lady Altas	25–14	26–24	25–9	–	–	76–47	
05 Feb	–	Perpetual Junior Lady Altas	3–0	San Sebastian Lady Staglets	25–13	25–15	25–14	–	–	75–42	
05 Feb	–	Lyceum Junior Lady Pirates	0–3	Arellano Lady Braves	6–25	17–25	6–25	–	–	29–75	

==== Scores ====
Teams	AU	LPU–C	SSC–R	UPHSD
Arellano Lady Braves	—	3–0	3–0	3–0
Lyceum Junior Lady Pirates	—	—	1–3	0–3
San Sebastian Lady Staglets	—	—	—	0–3
Perpetual Junior Lady Altas	—	—	—	—

Updated to match(es) played on February 6, 2020. Source: ABS–CBN Sports
Legend: Blue = left column team win; Red = top row team win.

== Postponement ==
On January 13, the juniors, men's and women's matches between Arellano University and Emilio Aguinaldo College, and the Mapúa University and College of St. Benilde were postponed due to ash fall following the eruption of Taal Volcano.

As a precautionary measure in light of the Novel Coronavirus (COVID-19) outbreak, the NCAA management committee decided to postpone all Season 95 sporting events starting February 14. All juniors' games were postponed starting February 7. Games was originally planned to resume on March 16 after a month of halt following the outbreak. The women's and men's tournament were later cancelled altogether.

== See also ==
- UAAP Season 82 volleyball tournaments
