= NCAA beach volleyball championships (Philippines) =

Beach Volleyball championship

NCAA Beach Volleyball championship
- Sport: Beach Volleyball
- Founded: 2002
- Country: Philippines
- Most recent champions: Men's division: San Beda University; Women's division: San Beda University; Juniors' division: Colegio de San Juan de Letran
- Most titles: Men's division: De La Salle–College of Saint Benilde (7 titles); Women's division: San Sebastian College–Recoletos (7 titles); Juniors' division: EAC–Immaculate Conception Academy (5 titles)

The National Collegiate Athletic Association (Philippines) beach volleyball tournament is held in March, the beginning of the dry season in the Philippines.

== Champions ==
Demonstration sport
Denotes school won juniors', men's and women's championship in the same year
Denotes school won 2 of 3 divisions in the same year

Academic Year	Men	Women	Juniors	Ref.
78 (2002–03)	De La Salle–College of Saint Benilde (1)	San Sebastian College–Recoletos (1)	No tournament	
79 (2003–04)	De La Salle–College of Saint Benilde (2)	Colegio de San Juan de Letran (1)	No tournament	
80 (2004–05)	De La Salle–College of Saint Benilde (3)	Philippine Christian University (1)	No tournament	
81 (2005–06)	De La Salle–College of Saint Benilde (4)	De La Salle–College of Saint Benilde (1)	No tournament	
82 (2006–07)	Philippine Christian University (1)	Philippine Christian University (2)	No tournament	
83 (2007–08)	De La Salle–College of Saint Benilde (5)	San Sebastian College–Recoletos (2)	Colegio de San Juan de Letran (1)	
84 (2008–09)	Colegio de San Juan de Letran (1)	San Sebastian College–Recoletos (3)	San Sebastian College–Recoletos (1)	
85 (2009–10)	Colegio de San Juan de Letran (2)	University of Perpetual Help System DALTA (1)	University of Perpetual Help System DALTA (1)	
86 (2010–11)	Arellano University (1)	University of Perpetual Help System DALTA (2)	University of Perpetual Help System DALTA (2)	
87 (2011–12)	Arellano University (2)	University of Perpetual Help System DALTA (3)	EAC–Immaculate Conception Academy (1)	
88 (2012–13)	University of Perpetual Help System DALTA (1)	University of Perpetual Help System DALTA (4)	EAC–Immaculate Conception Academy (2)	
89 (2013–14)	De La Salle–College of Saint Benilde (6)	San Sebastian College–Recoletos (4)	Arellano University (1)	
90 (2014–15)	De La Salle–College of Saint Benilde (7)	San Sebastian College–Recoletos (5)	EAC–Immaculate Conception Academy (3)	
91 (2015–16)	Mapúa Institute of Technology (1)	San Sebastian College–Recoletos (6)	San Sebastian College–Recoletos (2)	
92 (2016–17)	University of Perpetual Help System DALTA (2)	San Sebastian College–Recoletos (7)	EAC–Immaculate Conception Academy (4)	
93 (2017–18)	Emilio Aguinaldo College (1)	San Beda University (1)	Arellano University (2)	
94 (2018–19)	Emilio Aguinaldo College (2)	San Beda University (2)	University of Perpetual Help System DALTA (3)	
95 (2019–20)	Not held due to the COVID-19 pandemic			
96 (2020–21)	Not held due to the COVID-19 pandemic			
97 (2021–22)	Not held due to the COVID-19 pandemic			
98 (2022–23)	University of Perpetual Help System DALTA (3)	Colegio de San Juan de Letran (2)	Tournament not held due to COVID-19 pandemic	
99 (2023–24)	University of Perpetual Help System DALTA (4)	Colegio de San Juan de Letran (3)	EAC–Immaculate Conception Academy (5)	
100 (2024–25)	Emilio Aguinaldo College (3)	Colegio de San Juan de Letran (4)	Arellano University (3)	
101 (2025–26)	San Beda University (1)	San Beda University (3)	Colegio de San Juan de Letran (2)	

== Number of championships by school ==
The school left the league

School	Men	Women	Juniors	Total
University of Perpetual Help System DALTA	4	4	3	11
San Sebastian College–Recoletos	0	7	2	9
De La Salle–College of Saint Benilde	7	1	0	8
Colegio de San Juan de Letran	2	4	2	8
Emilio Aguinaldo College	3	0	5	8
Arellano University	2	0	3	5
San Beda University	1	3	0	4
Philippine Christian University (Note: PCU left the league in 2009.)	1	2	0	3
Mapúa University (Note: The Mapúa High School was closed down in 2005. Since 2008, the Malayan High School of Science Red Robins represented Mapúa University in the juniors' division.)	1	0	0	1

== Individual awards ==
=== Most Valuable Player ===
NCAA Season	Men's division	Women's division	Juniors' division	Ref
83 (2007–08)		Laurence Ann Latigay		
84 (2008–09)	Eden Canlas	Laurence Ann Latigay	Patrick John Rojas	
85 (2009–10)				
86 (2010–11)	Chris Salvador	Keshia de Luna	John Erickson Francisco	
87 (2011–12)	John Carlo Lozada	April Ann Sartin	Jopet Adrian Movido	
88 (2012–13)	Jay Dela Cruz	Norie Jane Diaz	Jopet Adrian Movido	
89 (2013–14)	John Vic De Guzman	Grethcel Soltones	Dan Carlo dela Cruz	
90 (2014–15)		Grethcel Soltones		
91 (2015–16)	Paul Cuzon	Grethcel Soltones		
92 (2016–17)	Rey Taneo Jr.	Grethcel Soltones		
93 (2017–18)	Joshua Mina	Nieza Viray	Adrian Villados	
94 (2018–19)	Joshua Mina	Nieza Viray	Noel Michael Kampton	
95 (2019–20)	Tournament not held due to the COVID-19 pandemic			
96 (2020–21)	Tournament not held due to the COVID-19 pandemic			
97 (2021–22)	Tournament not held due to the COVID-19 pandemic			
98 (2022–23)	Jefferson Marapoc	Chamberlaine Cuñada	Tournament not held due to COVID-19 pandemic	
99 (2023–24)	Louie Ramirez	Gia Marcel Maquilang	Alijhan Apdian	
100 (2024–25)	John Ruther Abor	Gia Marcel Maquilang	John Olsen Robles	
101 (2025–26)	Mohammad Shaif Ali Tahiluddin	Bea Udarbe	Jasper Afgao	

=== Rookie of the Year ===
NCAA Season	Men's division	Women's division	Juniors' division	Ref
99 (2023–24)	James Harold Marasigan	Gia Marcel Maquilang	Alijhan Apdian	
100 (2024–25)	Paul Justine Say	Stacey Denise Lopez	Jamt Paul Apdian	
101 (2025–26)	Maximus Lopez	Bea Udarbe	Roderick Medino	

=== Freshman of the Year ===
NCAA Season	Men's division	Women's division	Juniors' division	Ref
99 (2023–24)	Not Awarded	Gia Marcel Maquilang	Not Awarded	
100 (2024–25)	Ace Van Robnoel Blanco	Cara Xia Xyra Dayanan	Not Awarded	
101 (2025–26)	Mark Jun Rosales	Bea Udarbe	Roderick Medino	

=== Coach of the Year ===
NCAA Season	Men's division	Women's division	Juniors' division	Ref
99 (2023–24)	Michael Carino	Michael Inoferio	Rod Palmero	
100 (2024–25)	Rod Palmero	Michael Inoferio	Marlo Estacio	
101 (2025–26)	RJ Del Rosario	Paul Jan Doloiras	EJ Ramos	

== See also ==
- NCAA Volleyball Championship (Philippines)
- UAAP Beach Volleyball Championship
