= NCAA swimming championships (Philippines) =

Swimming tournament

NCAA Swimming championship
- Sport: Swimming
- Founded: 1924
- Country: Philippines
- Most recent champions: Men's division: San Beda University; Women's division: San Beda University; Juniors' division: La Salle Green Hills
- Most titles: Men's division: Mapúa University (40 titles); Women's division: San Beda University (13 titles); Juniors' division: San Beda University–Rizal (24 titles)

The National Collegiate Athletic Association (Philippines) swimming tournament is held every August during the year-long NCAA season.

The championship is determined by the total number of points accumulated by a team, by virtue by the placements in the final rounds (similar to the method used in the General Championship.

== Champions ==
Demonstration sport
Denotes school won the triple crown
Denotes school won 2 of 3 divisions in the same year

Academic Year	Men's	Women's	Juniors'
1925–26	University of the Philippines Diliman (1)	No tournament	No tournament
1926–27	University of the Philippines Diliman (2)	No tournament	No tournament
1927–29	Not Held	No tournament	No tournament
1929–30	University of Santo Tomas (1)	No tournament	No tournament
1930–31	University of the Philippines Diliman (3)	No tournament	No tournament
1931–32	Not Held	No tournament	No tournament
1932–33	San Beda College (1)	No tournament	No tournament
1933–34	San Beda College (2)	No tournament	No tournament
1934–35	San Beda College (3)	No tournament	De La Salle College (1)
1935–36	De La Salle College (1)	No tournament	De La Salle College (2)
1936–37	San Beda College (4)	No tournament	Mapúa Institute of Technology (1)
1937–38		No tournament	Not Held
1938–39	San Beda College (5)	No tournament	De La Salle College (3)
1939–40	Mapúa Institute of Technology (1)	No tournament	Mapúa Institute of Technology (2)
1940–41	Colegio de San Juan de Letran (1)	No tournament	Mapúa Institute of Technology (3)
1941–47		No tournament	Not Held due to World War II
1947–48	Mapúa Institute of Technology (2)	No tournament	San Beda College (1)
1948–49	Mapúa Institute of Technology (3)	No tournament	San Beda College (2)
1949–50	Mapúa Institute of Technology (4)	No tournament	Mapúa Institute of Technology (4)
1950–51		No tournament	Not Held
1951–52	Mapúa Institute of Technology (5)	No tournament	Mapúa Institute of Technology (5)
1952–53	Mapúa Institute of Technology (6)	No tournament	Mapúa Institute of Technology (6)
1953–54	Mapúa Institute of Technology (7)	No tournament	Mapúa Institute of Technology (7)
1954–55	Mapúa Institute of Technology (8)	No tournament	Mapúa Institute of Technology (8)
1955–56	Mapúa Institute of Technology (9)	No tournament	Mapúa Institute of Technology (9)
1956–57	Mapúa Institute of Technology (10)	No tournament	Mapúa Institute of Technology (10)
1957–58	Mapúa Institute of Technology (11)	No tournament	Mapúa Institute of Technology (11)
1958–59	Mapúa Institute of Technology (12)	No tournament	Mapúa Institute of Technology (12)
1959–60	Mapúa Institute of Technology (13)	No tournament	Mapúa Institute of Technology (13)
1960–61	Mapúa Institute of Technology (14)	No tournament	Mapúa Institute of Technology (14)
1961–62		No tournament	Suspended
1962–65		No tournament	Not Held
1965–66	Mapúa Institute of Technology (15)	No tournament	Mapúa Institute of Technology (15)
1966–67	Mapúa Institute of Technology (16)	No tournament	Mapúa Institute of Technology (16)
1967–68	Mapúa Institute of Technology (17)	No tournament	Mapúa Institute of Technology (17)
1968–69	Mapúa Institute of Technology (18)	No tournament	Mapúa Institute of Technology (18)
1969–70	Mapúa Institute of Technology (19)	No tournament	Mapúa Institute of Technology (19)
1970–71	Mapúa Institute of Technology (20)	No tournament	Mapúa Institute of Technology (20)
1971–72	Mapúa Institute of Technology (21)	No tournament	Mapúa Institute of Technology (21)
1972–73	Mapúa Institute of Technology (22)	No tournament	San Beda College (3)
1973–74		No tournament	Not Held
1974–75	Mapúa Institute of Technology (23)	No tournament	La Salle Green Hills (1)
1975–76		No tournament	Not Held
1976–77	Mapúa Institute of Technology (24)	No tournament	La Salle Green Hills (2)
1977–78	Mapúa Institute of Technology (25)	No tournament	La Salle Green Hills (3)
1978–79	Mapúa Institute of Technology (26)	No tournament	La Salle Green Hills (4)
1979–80	Mapúa Institute of Technology (27)	No tournament	La Salle Green Hills (5)
1980–81	Mapúa Institute of Technology (28)	No tournament	La Salle Green Hills (6)
1981–82	Mapúa Institute of Technology (29)	No tournament	San Beda College (4)
1982–83	Mapúa Institute of Technology (30)	No tournament	San Beda College (5)
1983–84	Mapúa Institute of Technology (31)	No tournament	Colegio de San Juan de Letran (1)
1984–85	Mapúa Institute of Technology (32)	No tournament	San Sebastian College–Recoletos (1)
1985–86	Mapúa Institute of Technology (33)	No tournament	Colegio de San Juan de Letran (2)
1986–87	Colegio de San Juan de Letran (2)	No tournament	San Beda College (6)
1987–88	Mapúa Institute of Technology (34)	No tournament	San Beda College (7)
1988–89	Mapúa Institute of Technology (35)	No tournament	San Beda College (8)
1989–90	Mapúa Institute of Technology (36)	No tournament	San Beda College (9)
1990–91	Mapúa Institute of Technology (37)	No tournament	San Beda College (10)
1991–92	Mapúa Institute of Technology (38)	No tournament	Mapúa Institute of Technology (22)
1992–93	Not Held	No tournament	San Beda College (11)
1993–94	Mapúa Institute of Technology (39)	No tournament	San Beda College (12)
1994–95	San Sebastian College–Recoletos (1)	No tournament	San Beda College (13)
1995–96	Perpetual Help College of Rizal (1)	No tournament	Perpetual Help College of Rizal (1)
1996–97	Mapúa Institute of Technology (40)	No tournament	San Beda College (14)
1997–98	University of Perpetual Help Rizal (2)	No tournament	San Beda College (15)
1998–99	University of Perpetual Help Rizal (3)	No tournament	San Beda College (16)
1999–2000	Philippine Christian University (1)	No tournament	San Beda College (17)
2000–01	Philippine Christian University (2)	No tournament	San Beda College (18)
2001–02	Philippine Christian University (3)	No tournament	San Beda College (19)
2002–03	San Beda College (6)	No tournament	San Beda College (20)
2003–04	San Beda College (7)	No tournament	San Beda College (21)
2004–05	San Beda College (8)	No tournament	La Salle Green Hills (7)
2005–06	San Beda College (9)	No tournament	La Salle Green Hills (8)
2006–07	San Beda College (10)	No tournament	La Salle Green Hills (9)
2007–08	San Beda College (11)	No tournament	La Salle Green Hills (10)
2008–09	San Beda College (12)	No tournament	La Salle Green Hills (11)
2009–10	San Beda College (13)	De La Salle–College of Saint Benilde (1)	La Salle Green Hills (12)
2010–11	San Beda College (14)	De La Salle–College of Saint Benilde (2)	La Salle Green Hills (13)
2011–12	San Beda College (15)	San Beda College (1)	La Salle Green Hills (14)
2012–13	San Beda College (16)	San Beda College (2)	La Salle Green Hills (15)
2013–14	San Beda College (17)	San Beda College (3)	La Salle Green Hills (16)
2014–15	San Beda College (18)	San Beda College (4)	La Salle Green Hills (17)
2015–16	San Beda College (19)	San Beda College (5)	La Salle Green Hills (18)
2016–17	San Beda College (20)	San Beda College (6)	San Beda College–Rizal (22)
2017–18	San Beda College (21)	San Beda College (7)	San Beda College–Rizal (23)
2018–19	San Beda University (22)	San Beda University (8)	La Salle Green Hills (19)
2019–20	San Beda University (23)	San Beda University (9)	La Salle Green Hills (20)
2020–21	Not held due to COVID-19 pandemic		
2021–22	Not held due to COVID-19 pandemic		
2022–23	San Beda University (24)	San Beda University (10)	Not held
2023–24	San Beda University (25)	San Beda University (11)	La Salle Green Hills (21)
2024–25	San Beda University (26)	San Beda University (12)	San Beda University–Rizal (24)
2025–26	San Beda University (27)	San Beda University (13)	La Salle Green Hills (22)
2026–27	San Beda University (28)	San Beda University (14)	La Salle Green Hills (23)

== Number of championships by school ==
The school left the league

School	Men	Women	Jrs	Total
San Beda University	28	14	24	66
Mapúa University (Note: The Mapúa High School was closed down in 2005. Since 2008, the Malayan High School of Science Red Robins represented Mapúa University in the juniors' division.)	40	0	22	62
La Salle Green Hills (Note: LSGH has won six (6) championships under DLSU and fifteen (15) championships under CSB.)	0	0	23	23
Colegio de San Juan de Letran	2	0	2	4
De La Salle College	1	0	3	4
University of Perpetual Help System DALTA	3	0	1	4
Philippine Christian University	3	0	0	3
University of the Philippines Diliman	3	0	0	3
De La Salle–College of Saint Benilde	0	2	0	2
San Sebastian College–Recoletos	1	0	1	2
University of Santo Tomas	1	0	0	1

== See also ==
- UAAP Swimming Championship
