= NCAA track and field championships (Philippines) =

Track and Field championship

NCAA Beach Volleyball championship
- Sport: Track and Field
- Founded: 1925
- Country: Philippines
- Most recent champions: Seniors' division: Mapúa University; Juniors' division: José Rizal University
- Most titles: Seniors' division: Mapúa University (27 titles); Juniors' division: San Sebastian College–Recoletos (11 titles)

The National Collegiate Athletic Association (Philippines) track and field champions. The school with the highest number of cumulative points wins the championship.

Like other NCAA events, there are two championships that are awarded, the Seniors division and the Juniors division championships. The championships are held outdoors.

== Champions ==
There was no juniors' and seniors' team
Denotes school won double crown

Academic Year	Seniors'	Juniors'
1925–26	Ateneo de Manila (1) (relay); De La Salle College (1) (relay and t/f); University of the Philippines Manila (1) (t/f)	
1926–27	De La Salle College (2) (relays and t/f)	
1927–28	University of the Philippines Manila (2) (relays and t/f)	
1928–29	University of the Philippines Manila (3) (t/f)	
1929–30	University of the Philippines Manila (4) (relays and t/f)	
1930–31	University of the Philippines Manila (5) (relays); National University (1) (t/f)	
1931–32	National University (2) (relays); University of the Philippines Manila (6) (t/f)	
1932–33	Colegio de San Juan de Letran (1)	
1933–34	De La Salle College (3)	
1934–35	Ateneo de Manila (2) (relays); Mapúa Institute of Technology (1) (t/f)	
1935–36	De La Salle College (3) (relays); José Rizal College (1) (t/f)	
1936–37	José Rizal College (2) (t/f)	
1937–38	Not held	
1938–39	Mapúa Institute of Technology (2) (t/f)	
1939–40	Mapúa Institute of Technology (3) (relays)	
1940–41	Not held	
1941–47	Not held due to World War II	
1947–48	José Rizal College (3) (relays); Mapúa Institute of Technology (4) (t/f)	
1948–49	Mapúa Institute of Technology (5)	
1949–50	Mapúa Institute of Technology (6) (relays); Ateneo de Manila (3) (t/f)	
1950–51	Not held	
1951–52	Mapúa Institute of Technology (7)	
1952–53	Mapúa Institute of Technology (8)	
1953–54	Mapúa Institute of Technology (1)	Not Held
1954–55	Mapúa Institute of Technology (2)	Ateneo de Manila (1)
1955–56	Mapúa Institute of Technology (3)	De La Salle College (1)
1956–57	Mapúa Institute of Technology (4)	De La Salle College (2)
1957–58	Mapúa Institute of Technology (5)	De La Salle College (3)
1958–59	Mapúa Institute of Technology (6)	De La Salle College (4)
1959–60	Mapúa Institute of Technology (7)	De La Salle College (5)
1960–61	Ateneo de Manila University (1)	Ateneo de Manila University (2)
1961–65	Suspended	
1965–66	Ateneo de Manila University (2)	Ateneo de Manila University (3)
1966–67	Ateneo de Manila University (3)	Ateneo de Manila University (4)
1967–68	Ateneo de Manila University (4)	Ateneo de Manila University (5)
1968–69	Ateneo de Manila University (5)	Ateneo de Manila University (6)
1969–70	Ateneo de Manila University (6)	La Salle Green Hills (1)
1970–71	Mapúa Institute of Technology (8)	Ateneo de Manila University (7)
1971–72	Mapúa Institute of Technology (9)	Ateneo de Manila University (8)
1972–73	De La Salle College (1)	Ateneo de Manila University (9)
1973–74	De La Salle College (2)	Not Held
1974–75	De La Salle College (3)	Ateneo de Manila University (10)
1975–76	De La Salle University (4)	La Salle Green Hills (2)
1976–77	De La Salle University (5)	La Salle Green Hills (3)
1977–78	De La Salle University (6)	La Salle Green Hills (4)
1978–79	De La Salle University (7)	La Salle Green Hills (5)
1979–80	Colegio de San Juan de Letran (1)	San Beda College (1)
1980–81	De La Salle University (8)	San Beda College (2)
1981–82	San Sebastian College–Recoletos (1)	Trinity College of Quezon City (1)
1982–83	Mapúa Institute of Technology (10)	Mapúa Institute of Technology (1)
1983–84	Mapúa Institute of Technology (11)	Mapúa Institute of Technology (2)
1984–85	Mapúa Institute of Technology (12)	Colegio de San Juan de Letran (1)
1985–86	Mapúa Institute of Technology (13)	San Sebastian College–Recoletos (1)
1986–87	Mapúa Institute of Technology (14)	Colegio de San Juan de Letran (2)
1987–88	Mapúa Institute of Technology (15)	San Beda College (3)
1988–89	Mapúa Institute of Technology (16)	San Beda College (4)
1989–90	Colegio de San Juan de Letran (2)	San Beda College (5)
1990–91	Mapúa Institute of Technology (17)	San Beda College (6)
1991–92	Mapúa Institute of Technology (18)	San Sebastian College–Recoletos (2)
1992–93	Mapúa Institute of Technology (19)	San Sebastian College–Recoletos (3)
1993–94	Perpetual Help College of Rizal (1)	San Sebastian College–Recoletos (4)
1994–95	San Sebastian College–Recoletos (2)	Mapúa Institute of Technology (3)
1995–96	Perpetual Help College of Rizal (2)	San Sebastian College–Recoletos (5)
1996–97	Perpetual Help College of Rizal (3)	Mapúa Institute of Technology (4)
1997–98	Colegio de San Juan de Letran (3)	San Sebastian College–Recoletos (6)
1998–99	Colegio de San Juan de Letran (4)	San Sebastian College–Recoletos (7)
1999–2000	Colegio de San Juan de Letran (5)	San Sebastian College–Recoletos (8)
2000–01	Mapúa Institute of Technology (20)	Colegio de San Juan de Letran (3)
2001–02	Mapúa Institute of Technology (21)	San Beda College (7)
2002–03	Mapúa Institute of Technology (22)	San Beda College (8)
2003–04	San Sebastian College–Recoletos (3)	Colegio de San Juan de Letran (4)
2004–05	Mapúa Institute of Technology (23)	Philippine Christian University (1)
2005–06	Philippine Christian University (1)	La Salle Green Hills (6)
2006–07	Mapúa Institute of Technology (24)	San Sebastian College–Recoletos (9)
2007–08	Mapúa Institute of Technology (25)	Colegio de San Juan de Letran (5)
2008–09	Mapúa Institute of Technology (26)	La Salle Green Hills (7)
2009–10	San Sebastian College–Recoletos (4)	San Sebastian College–Recoletos (10)
2010–11	José Rizal University (1)	San Sebastian College–Recoletos (11)
2011–12	José Rizal University (2)	San Sebastian College–Recoletos (12)
2012–13	José Rizal University (3)	EAC–Immaculate Conception Academy (1)
2013–14	José Rizal University (4)	EAC–Immaculate Conception Academy (2)
2014–15	José Rizal University (5)	EAC–Immaculate Conception Academy (3)
2015–16	Arellano University (1)	EAC–Immaculate Conception Academy (4)
2016–17	Arellano University (2)	EAC–Immaculate Conception Academy (5)
2017–18	Arellano University (3)	San Beda College–Rizal (9)
2018–19	José Rizal University (6)	University of Perpetual Help System DALTA (1)
2019–22	Not held due to the COVID–19 pandemic	
2020–21	Not held due to the COVID–19 pandemic	
2021–22	Not held due to the COVID–19 pandemic	
2022–23	José Rizal University (7)	Not held
2023–24	José Rizal University (8)	University of Perpetual Help System DALTA (2)
2024–25	José Rizal University (9)	José Rizal University (1)
2025–26	Mapúa University (27)	José Rizal University (2)

== Number of championships per school ==
The school left the league

School	Seniors	Juniors	Team	Total
Mapúa University (Note: The Mapúa High School was closed down in 2005. Since 2008, the Malayan High School of Science Red Robins represented Mapúa University in the juniors' division.)	27	4	8	39
De La Salle University (Note: LSGH won five (5) championships as juniors to DLSC/DLSU and two (2) championships as juniors to CSB.)	8	10	4	22
Ateneo de Manila University	6	10	3	19
San Sebastian College–Recoletos	4	11	0	15
José Rizal University	9	2	3	14
Colegio de San Juan de Letran	5	6	1	12
San Beda University	0	9	0	9
La Salle Green Hills	0	7	0	7
University of the Philippines Manila	0	0	6	6
University of Perpetual Help System DALTA	3	2	0	5
Philippine Christian University	1	2	0	3
Emilio Aguinaldo College	0	5	0	5
National University	0	0	2	2
Arellano University	3	0	0	3
Trinity College of Quezon City	0	1	0	1

== See also ==
- UAAP athletics championships
