= NCAA chess championships =

Chess championship

NCAA Chess overall championship
- Sport: Chess
- Founded: 1976
- Country: Philippines
- Most recent champions: Seniors' division: De La Salle–College of Saint Benilde; Juniors' division: San Beda University–Rizal
- Most titles: Seniors' division: San Sebastian College–Recoletos (14 titles); Juniors' division: Colegio de San Juan de Letran (15 titles)

The National Collegiate Athletic Association chess tournament is held every first semester of the Philippines academic year. The eight member schools send in a four-member team in both the Seniors and Juniors Division.

The structure is a Swiss-system tournament. At the end of the tournament, the schools with the two top scores would figure in a Finals match.

== Champions ==
Denotes school won double crown

Academic Year	Men	Juniors
1976–77	Mapúa Institute of Technology (1)	
1977–78	Mapúa Institute of Technology (2)	La Salle Green Hills (1)
1978–79	Colegio de San Juan de Letran (1)	La Salle Green Hills (2)
1979–80	Colegio de San Juan de Letran (2)	La Salle Green Hills (3)
1980–81	Colegio de San Juan de Letran (3)	La Salle Green Hills (4)
1981–82	San Sebastian College–Recoletos (1)	Trinity College of Quezon City (1)
1982–83	Mapúa Institute of Technology (3)	Mapúa Institute of Technology (1)
1983–84	Mapúa Institute of Technology (4)	Colegio de San Juan de Letran (1)
1984–85	Mapúa Institute of Technology (5)	Mapúa Institute of Technology (2)
1985–86	Colegio de San Juan de Letran (4)	Mapúa Institute of Technology (3)
1986–87	Mapúa Institute of Technology (6)	Mapúa Institute of Technology (4)
1987–88	San Sebastian College–Recoletos (2)	Colegio de San Juan de Letran (2)
1988–89	San Sebastian College–Recoletos (3)	Mapúa Institute of Technology (5)
1989–90	San Sebastian College–Recoletos (4)	San Beda College (1)
1990–91	San Sebastian College–Recoletos (5)	San Beda College (2)
1991–92	Mapúa Institute of Technology (7)	San Beda College (3)
1992–93	San Beda College (1)	San Sebastian College–Recoletos (1)
1993–94	Mapúa Institute of Technology (8)	San Sebastian College–Recoletos (2)
1994–95	Mapúa Institute of Technology (9)	San Sebastian College–Recoletos (3)
1995–96	Mapúa Institute of Technology (10)	San Sebastian College–Recoletos (4)
1996–97	Mapúa Institute of Technology (11)	Mapúa Institute of Technology (6)
1997–98	San Sebastian College–Recoletos (6)	San Beda College (4)
1998–99	San Sebastian College–Recoletos (7)	San Sebastian College–Recoletos (5)
1999–2000	San Sebastian College–Recoletos (8)	Colegio de San Juan de Letran (3)
2000–01	San Sebastian College–Recoletos (9)	Colegio de San Juan de Letran (4)
2001–02	San Sebastian College–Recoletos (10)	Colegio de San Juan de Letran (5)
2002–03	San Sebastian College–Recoletos (11)	Colegio de San Juan de Letran (6)
2003–04	Colegio de San Juan de Letran (5)	Colegio de San Juan de Letran (7)
2004–05	San Sebastian College–Recoletos (12)	San Sebastian College–Recoletos (6)
2005–06	De La Salle–College of Saint Benilde (1)	San Sebastian College–Recoletos (7)
2006–07	Philippine Christian University (1)	Philippine Christian University (1)
2007–08	De La Salle–College of Saint Benilde (2)	Colegio de San Juan de Letran (8)
2008–09	De La Salle–College of Saint Benilde (3)	Colegio de San Juan de Letran (9)
2009–10	Colegio de San Juan de Letran (6)	San Sebastian College–Recoletos (8)
2010–11	De La Salle–College of Saint Benilde (4)	La Salle Green Hills (5)
2011–12	De La Salle–College of Saint Benilde (5)	San Sebastian College–Recoletos (9)
2012–13	San Sebastian College–Recoletos (13)	Colegio de San Juan de Letran (10)
2013–14	San Sebastian College–Recoletos (14)	Colegio de San Juan de Letran (11)
2014–15	Arellano University (1)	Colegio de San Juan de Letran (12)
2015–16	Arellano University (2)	San Beda College–Rizal (5)
2016–17	San Beda College (2)	Colegio de San Juan de Letran (13)
2017–18	San Beda College (3)	Colegio de San Juan de Letran (14)
2018–19	De La Salle–College of Saint Benilde (6)	University of Perpetual Help System DALTA (1)
2019–20	University of Perpetual Help System DALTA (1)	San Beda University–Rizal (6)
2020–21	Lyceum of the Philippines University (1)	Colegio de San Juan de Letran (15)
2021–22	Not held due to the COVID–19 pandemic	
2022–23	Not held due to the COVID–19 pandemic	
2023–24	University of Perpetual Help System DALTA (2)	Lyceum of the Philippines University–Cavite (1)
2024–25	San Beda University (4)	Lyceum of the Philippines University–Cavite (2)
2025–26	De La Salle–College of Saint Benilde (7)	San Beda University–Rizal (7)

== Number of championships by school ==
The school left the league

School	Seniors'	Juniors'	Total
San Sebastian College–Recoletos	14	9	23
Colegio de San Juan de Letran	6	15	20
Mapúa University (Note: The Mapúa High School was closed down in 2005. Since 2008, the Malayan High School of Science Red Robins represented Mapúa University in the juniors' division.)	11	6	17
San Beda University	4	7	11
De La Salle–College of Saint Benilde (Note: LSGH won its four (4) championships as a junior for DLSU and one (1) for Benilde.)	7	0	7
La Salle Green Hills	0	5	5
University of Perpetual Help System DALTA	2	1	3
Lyceum of the Philippines University	1	2	3
Arellano University	2	0	2
Philippine Christian University	1	1	2
Trinity College of Quezon City	0	1	1
