= Mapúa Cardinals, Lady Cardinals and Red Robins =

Varsity sports teams of Mapúa University, Philippines

Mapúa Cardinals and Lady Cardinals
- School: Mapúa University
- League: NCAA
- Joined: 1930
- Location: Intramuros, Manila (Jrs., Srs.); Pandacan, Manila (Jrs.)
- Team colors: Red, gold and black
- Women's team: Lady Cardinals
- Juniors' team: Malayan Red Robins

Seniors' general championships
- NCAA: 19 (1960-61, 1964-65, 1965-66, 1966-67, 1967-68, 1969-70, 1970-71, 1971-72, 1973-74, 1975-76, 1978-79, 1980-81, 1982-83, 1983-84, 1986-87, 1990-91, 1991-92, 1992-93, 1993-94)

Juniors' general championships
- NCAA: 8 (1964–65, 1968–69, 1969–70, 1970–71, 1972–73, 1984–85, 1985–86, 1994–95)

The Mapúa Cardinals and Lady Cardinals are the varsity sports teams of Mapúa University that play in the National Collegiate Athletic Association (Philippines).

The Mapúa Cardinals holds the NCAA record for the most general championships in the seniors' division with a total of 20—the last of these championships was won in 1993. At a distant second is Colegio de San Juan de Letran, which has eight seniors' titles.

Out of the total seniors' general championships won by the Cardinals, ten were from the 1980s to the mid-1990s, in addition to three (out of a total eight) in the juniors' division over the same period.

== Name ==
The "Cardinal" in the team's name was adopted from the American baseball team the St. Louis Cardinals, of which Tomas Mapúa, the founder of the Mapúa Institute of Technology, was a fan. The juniors' (high school) team adopted the moniker Red Robins.

== Basketball ==
=== History ===
The Mapúa Cardinals won the NCAA Seniors' Championship six times (in 1949, 1965, 1981 and back-to-back titles from 1990–91 to 1991-92, and in 2024). The MIT basketball team holds the distinction of producing alumni players who have won the season Most Valuable Player award in the professional Philippine Basketball Association (PBA) for the most years. Freddie Hubalde and Fortunato "Atoy" Co won this award once each in 1977 and 1979, respectively, while Alvin Patrimonio has won it four times, in 1991, 1993, 1994 and 1997. All three are members of the 25 All-Time Greatest PBA Players.

The Mapúa Red Robins, on the other hand, have won 18 NCAA championships, the last of which was won during the 2000 season. The Red Robins won five championships from 1968 to 1972. On October 14, 2016, the Malayan Red Robins, Mapúa's current juniors' team, won their first NCAA juniors' basketball championship, ending the San Beda Red Cubs' seven-year title reign.

=== Notable players ===
- Junel Baculi (BSCE) - former basketball coach of the Philippine national basketball teams which won the 1996 Champions Cup in Malaysia, the 1997 Champions Cup in Manila and the 2007 Seaba Games.
- Carlos Badion - member of the 1956 and 1960 Olympic teams, MVP of the 1960 Asian Basketball Confederation Championship and Philippine Basketball Hall of Fame awardee.
- Joel Banal (BSMIE) - former basketball coach of the Mapua Cardinals-NCAA champion teams of 1990 and 1991, and Ateneo Blue Eagles-UAAP champion team of 2002.
- Benny Cheng - 1991 NCAA MVP.
- Atoy Co (BSChE) - Philippine Basketball Association (PBA)'s 1979 MVP, member of the 1972 Olympic team, the 1973 Asian Basketball Conference champion team, the Crispa Redmanizers, the PBA's Hall of Fame; one of the PBA's 25 All-Time Greatest Players.
- Kelvin dela Peña - NCAA Seniors' Rookie of the Year (2005) NCAA Seniors' MVP (2007), Mythical 5 (2007), Media MVP (2007), 15th Draft Pick Alaska Aces (2009).
- Freddie Hubalde - NCAA 1973 Seniors' Basketball MVP; PBA's 1977 MVP; member of the Crispa Redmanizers; one of the PBA's 25 All-Time Greatest Players.
- Leo Isaac (BSMIE) - NCAA 1981 Seniors' Basketball MVP; former PBAplayer; former coach of the Arellano University Chiefs and the Mapua Cardinals senior basketball teams; former coach of the Barako Bull Energy Boosters and the Blackwater Elite in the PBA.
- Jesusito D Legaspi (BSCE) - NCAA 1979 Most Exciting Player of the Year.
- Allwell Oraeme - NCAA MVP (2015, 2016), NCAA Defensive Player of the Year (2015, 2016), NCAA Rookie of the Year (2015)
- Alvin Patrimonio (BSCE) - NCAA MVP (1985, 1986), PBA's four-time MVP, in 1991, 1993, 1994 and 1997; member of several Philippine national basketball teams; one of the PBA's 25 All-Time Greatest Players. Current team manager of the Magnolia Hotshots.
- Bong Ramos (BSMIE) - member and top scorer of 1981 NCAA champion Mapua Cardinals; former coach of the Indonesian national basketball team; former head coach of FedEX Express in the PBA; former Head coach of Mapua Cardinals; former assistant coach of Barangay Ginebra (PBA); former assistant coach of Talk n' Text Phone Pals (PBA); head coach of CLS Knights Surabaya Indonesia Basketball League (IBL).
- Warren Bonifacio - Won Mythical Five honors in season 99 (2023-24) and helped the Cardinals reach the finals in seasons 97 and 99.
- Paolo Hernandez - Won the Most Improved Player award in season 97 (2021-22).
- Joseph Eriobu
- Kenneth Ighalo
- Adrian Nocum
- Yousef Taha

Other former Mapua Red Robins and/or Cardinals who eventually played in the Philippine Basketball Association (PBA) include Israel Catacutan, Ricardo dela Peña, "Bong" dela Cruz, Paolo Hubalde, Menardo Jubinal, Rudolph Kutch, Eric Leaño, Eugene Leano, Romulo Mamaril, Jay Mendoza, Kevin Ramas (1990 NCAA MVP), Ricky Relosa, Johnny Revilla, Reuben dela Rosa (1995 NCAA MVP), Omanzie Rodriguez, Victor Sanchez, Jack Santiago, Rudy Soriano, Mark Telan, Adonis Santa Maria, Japeth Aguilar, Chito Victolero and Marvin Ortiguerra.

== Volleyball ==
The school has men's and women's volleyball teams as well as men's and women's beach volleyball teams.

=== Honors and awards ===
Academic year	Player/team	Honor/award
2015–16 (NCAA Season 91)	Angelino Pertierra	Best Blocker
2015–16 (NCAA Season 91)	Dion Canlas	Best Digger
2015–16 (NCAA Season 91); Beach volleyball	Samuel Joseph Almalel; Philip Michael Bagalay; Paul John Cuzon	Champions
2015–16 (NCAA Season 91); Beach volleyball	Paul John Cuzon	Most Valuable Player
2022–23 (NCAA Season 98)	Barbie San Andres	Best outside spiker

== Track and field ==
Another sport where the Mapua Cardinals and Red Robins have performed well is in track and field. Prior to 1953, relay and track and field events were counted separately. Since 1953 when these events were formalized, MIT has won a total of 25 titles in the seniors' division and six in the juniors' division. Ateneo de Manila follows at a distant second with 17 juniors' and six seniors' titles.

=== Notable members ===
- Henry Dagmil - member of the Philippine track and field team; 2005 South East Asian Games gold medalist and record holder in the long jump event
- Florentino Toribio Manuel - member of 1950 Mapua Cardinals track and field
- Ruben Nieva (BSME) - member of MIT track and field 1979-1983; gold medal in 4x100 and 4x400 relay, bronze in 100m and javelin throw and bronze in 4x400 relay as a member of the NCAA selection during the annual NCR competition (1979) coached by Claro Pellosis; team captain of 1983 NCAA Track and Field champion
- Claro Pellosis - member of the 1936 Olympic team for track and field
- Rodelio Santos - member of MIT track and field 1982-1984; first winner of five gold medals in the NCAA for the MIT Red Robins in long jump, triple jump, 400m hurdles, 4x400 relay, and 4x100 relay under Coach Claro Pellosis
- Simeon Toribio - member of the 1928, 1932 and 1936 Olympic teams; Olympic bronze medalist in the high jump event at the 1932 Los Angeles Olympics; many-time Asian Games gold medalist; recipient of the 1930 Helms World Trophy for being Asia's greatest athlete, the only Filipino to be awarded this honor
- Miguel White - member of the 1936 Olympic team; Olympic bronze medalist in the 400m hurdles at the 1936 Berlin Olympics

== Other sports ==
Mapúa University has also shown great performances in other sports.

=== Swimming ===
The Mapúa seniors' swimming team, coached for many years by Edilberto Bonus, won 40 titles in the seniors' division and 22 in the juniors. This clearly dominating record is followed only by that of San Beda College with 21 championships in the juniors' division but only eight titles in the seniors' events. MIT's tankers last won the seniors' crown in 1997 while the last juniors' title was won in 1991.

Bonus won the bronze medal at the first Asian Games held in New Delhi, India in 1951. Until his retirement, he was a professor of both Mathematics and Physical Education at the Institute. He also served as President of the Philippine Amateur Swimming Association for several years.

=== Chess ===
The MIT chess team has produced the likes of Eugene Torre, Asia's first grandmaster, as well as International Master Renato Naranja, both of whom represented the country in the 1972 Chess Olympiad and International Master Ildefonso Datu. Several notable players in the likes of IM Marlo Micayabas, Gilbert Humangit, William Mendoza, Ernesto Encarnacion Jr., Diosdado “Bong” Ortiz, Eric Quizon, Hoyle Disuanco and Julius Joseph De Ramos also honed their skills with the Mapua seniors' chess team during the mid 80s contributed to the team’s championships. The team was headed by coach Isidro Asidao. Mapua has won a total of 11 NCAA chess titles in the seniors' division, the last being in 1996, and six NCAA juniors' titles, the last being in 1996 also.

=== Tennis ===
MIT leads the NCAA with 16 seniors' and 17 juniors' titles, followed by San Beda with 11 seniors' and 14 juniors' championships. Mapua's tennis greats include former Philippine and Southeast Asian number one netter Manuel Tolentino, who represented the country in the 1984 Los Angeles Olympics. Mapua last won the seniors' title in 1994 and the juniors' in 1997.

=== Football ===
Behind La Salle and San Beda, Mapúa has the third best winning record in football with seven juniors' titles and 12 seniors' titles. The MIT football team has produced several players who have played for the Philippine national football team in international competitions.

=== Taekwondo ===
In 1986, a former Philippine team member and 14th Southeast Asian Games silver medalist middleweight practitioner introduced Taekwondo at Mapua. This led to the formation of the Mapua Taekwondo Association (MITTA), which represented the school in interschool and national championships, starting in 1986. MITTA's best performance was in the 1989 Interschool Championships, where Mapua Gold won the bronze medal. The association disbanded in 1992, but Taekwondo is now being taught at the school once again with the aim of developing new players for school representation.

== Cheering at the NCAA ==
=== The MU Cheerping Cardinals ===
The Mapúa Cheerleading Association of the university's athletic program, known informally as the Cheerping Cardinals, won the NCAA's first-ever cheer-dancing competition held in 2004. They have since continued to show and exhibit competitive performances, including a runner-up finish in the 2007 competition where they lost to the University of Perpetual Help pep squad by a single point.

=== MU songs and cheers ===
The staple cheer of Mapúa University is the cry "Viva Mapúa!"
