= Letran Knights, Lady Knights and Squires =

Collegiate varsity sports teams

Letrán Knights and Lady Knights
- School: Colegio de San Juan de Letran
- League: NCAA
- Joined: 1928
- Location: Intramuros, Manila
- Team colors: Blue and Red
- Women's team: Lady Knights
- Juniors' team: Squires

Seniors' general championships
- NCAA: 9 (1979-80, 1997–98, 1998–99, 1999–2000, 2000–01, 2001–02, 2002–03, 2003–04, 2009–10)

Juniors' general championships
- NCAA: 8 (1983-84, 1985-86, 1986-87, 1987-88, 1999-2000, 2000-01, 2001-02, 2002-03)

- Athletic moderators of Colegio de San Juan de Letran
- 1926 – Fr. Narciso Arribas, OP; 1928–32 – Fr. Antonio Varona, OP; 1932–36 – Fr. Tomas Martinez, OP; 1937-40 - Fr. Honorio Muñoz, OP; 1941-46 - Fr. Francisco Sadaba, OP; 1946-49 - Fr. Gregorio Raymundo, OP; 1950 - Fr. Martin Diez, OP; 1951-52 - Fr. Pedro Tejero, OP; 1953 - Fr. Gonzalo Ursino, OP; 1954 - Fr. Antonio Cabezon, OP; 1954-55 - Fr. Jesus Mancebo, OP; 1956-57 - Fr. Eladio Neira, OP; 1958-59 - Fr. Francisco Mendoza, OP (Spaniard); 1959-62 - Fr. Angel Daniel Blasquez, OP; 1962-65 - Fr. Gregorio Raymundo, OP; 1965-66 - Fr. Rodolfo Gubatan, OP; 1968-69 - Fr. Antonio Cabezon, OP; 1969-70 - Fr. Antonio Posadas, OP; 1970-71 - Fr. Fernando Martinez, OP; 1971-72 - Fr. Francisco Mendoza, OP (Filipino); 1972-73 - Fr. Rafael Quejada, OP, Fr. Francisco Mendoza, OP, Fr. Alejandro Ignacio, OP; 1974-80 - Fr. Edilberto Alerta, OP; 1980-85 - Fr. Franklin Beltran, OP; 1985-86 - Fr. Amador Ambat, OP; 1986-91 - Fr. Hector Mariñas, OP; 1991-95 - Mr. Jose B. Mendoza, HS'57, BSC'61; 1995-2003 - Fr. Edgardo Alaurin, OP; 2003 - Fr. Napoleon Encarnacion, OP; 2004-present - Fr. Victor C. Calvo Jr., OP; Source

The Letran Knights and Lady Knights are the collegiate varsity teams representing Colegio de San Juan de Letran in the National Collegiate Athletic Association. The high school varsity teams are called the Squires.

The college's varsity teams also participate in other sports leagues such as the Filoil Flying V Preseason Cup, Fr. Martin's Cup, V-League, Milcu Got Skills Inter School, among others.

== Athletic history ==
The first athletic varsity team in Letran began in 1911 when the vice-rector, Rev. Fr. Juan Sanchez, O.P., organized Letran Athletic Club, with the objective of strengthening the solidarity and fraternity among the students and alumni and for the development of the youth by introducing different kinds of sports. The following were named Honorary Presidents: The very Rev. Fr Rector, Calixto Proeto, O.P., Justices Cayetano Arellano and Manuel Araullo and Manila City Engineer Emilio Quisumbing who had previously served as President.

In 1917, the Liga Catolica (the Catholic League), the immediate predecessor of the National Collegiate Athletic Association (NCAA) among the sectarian schools, was founded and lasted until 1920. The members were Letran, San Beda, Ateneo, De La Salle, San Vicente de Paul, and UST. Football was a major sports event and basketball was also played.

In 1928, Letran formally joined the NCAA, which was founded in 1924. Letran adopted the Knights monicker after its founder, Spanish officer Don Juan Alonso Geronimo Guerrero, who was a Knight of Malta. That same year the team’s first NCAA crown won in the midgets division (now the juniors) of basketball tournament, then retaining the crown in 1929 and 1930.

Letran withdrew from the NCAA in 1933 as a form of protest for the unjust decision of the league management during the Letran-Ateneo basketball game. The team then re-joined the league in 1936.

Since joining the NCAA and the establishment of the NCAA general championship in 1960, Letran has won 9 NCAA general championships in the seniors division, while 8 general championship titles have won in the juniors division.

== Varsity teams ==
- Basketball
- Football
- Volleyball
- Tennis
- Badminton
- Table tennis
- Track and field
- Taekwondo
- Chess
- Swimming
- Esports

== Basketball ==
Letran was one of the institutions who formed the first interschool league in the Philippines, the Liga Catolica, in 1917 until 1920. When Letran College joined the NCAA in 1928, the juniors basketball team won their first championship, and then followed with two consecutive titles, establishing the first juniors' three-peat championships in the team.

In the NCAA, they have the second most number of combined basketball championships, with 34 titles. They also achieved the rare double championship three times: the first was in 1979-1980 season, followed by 1983-1984 season, and the latest is the 2022-23 season.

The seniors’ team have won 20 NCAA championships, while their juniors’ counterpart have 14 championships. The Knights’ most recent championship was in 2022-23 season, while the Squires’ most recent championship was in 2025-26 season.

== Volleyball ==
=== Women's volleyball ===
The Lady Knights volleyball team have won a total of nine NCAA championships. The Lady Knights debuted in the NCAA in 1977 and were coached by Herminio "Boggs" Rivera. On that same year, they won their very first NCAA championship with only seven players in their roster.

The Lady Knights' most recent championship was in 2025-26 season.

=== Men's volleyball team ===
The Letran Knights men's volleyball team have won a total of 13 NCAA championships. Their first championship was won during the 1981–82 season.

The men's volleyball team last won the title during the 2009–2010 season bannered by Peter Warren Pirante, Erickson Ramos, and Renz Ordonez.

==== Current roster ====
NCAA Season 99

Letran Knights
No.	Name	Position
	AMBROCIO, Christer	
	ARAÑO, John Wayne	
	BANGCOLA, Abdul Hafiz	
	BAUTISTA, John Derrick	
	CABALLERO, Namron Ellehcar	
	CATRIS, Raxel Redd	
	CORDERO, Luke Redd	
	CORONADO, John Lawrence	
	HIMZON, Vince Virrey	
	LORENZO, John Paulo	
	MOLACRUZ, Vhan Marco	
	SANTIAGUDO, John Francis Jero	
	STA. MARIA, Steven	
	WINGCO, Keith Nolan	
	DOMOLANTA, Dennis (r)	
	JUMAPIT, Jeffrey Jr. (r)	
	ESQUIBEL, Bryan	Head coach

=== Beach volleyball ===
In 2023, the Lady Knights' tandem of Chamberlaine Cuñada and Lara Mae Silva upset the undefeated Perpetual Lady Altas to claim its second NCAA women's beach volleyball title. Cuñada was named the league MVP and head coach Mike Inoferio hailed as Coach of the Year. 2024 NCAA Season 99 The Tandem of Gia Marcel Maquilang and Lara Mae Silva sweep all teams without dropping a single set to become the NCAA Beach Volleyball champions. Gia Maquilan was the MVP, Rookie of the year and Freshman of the year awardee together with coach Mike Inoferio as coach of the year. In 2025 the Lady Knights continued their winning ways and had successfully became a 3 peat NCAA Women's Volleyball Champion bannered again by Gia Marcel Maquilang and Lara Mae Silva. Gia Maquilang was again the MVP and Mike Inferio was for the 3rd time Coach of the Year

=== Notable players ===
Women's Division

- Michelle Carolino

– member of the Philippine National Team who has won a lot of most valuable player awards, and Best Attacker and Best Scorer in both the NCAA (Philippines) league & Shakey's V - League

- Marietta Carolino

– sister of Michelle Carolino, member of the Philippine National Team who has won a lot of MVP awards, as well as Best Attacker and Best Scorer in both the NCAA (Philippines) league & Shakey's V - League.

- Chamberlaine Cuñada

-NCAA Season 98 women's beach volleyball MVP, NCAA Season 98 women's volleyball All-Stars MVP

- Gia Marcel Maquilang

NCAA Season 99 Women's Beach volleyball, MVP, Rookie of the year & Freshman of the year and NCAA Season 100 women's beach Volleyball MVP

Juniors' Division

- Raxel Redd Catris

– NCAA Season 93 Best Libero

- John Paulo Lorenzo

– NCAA Season 93 Best Opposite Spiker

== Taekwondo ==
=== Notable players ===
- Roberto Cruz - six-time SEA Games gold medalist, 2000 Olympian
- Ramil Abratique - 1988 National Team, 1990 SEA Games bronze medalist, 1991 10th World Taekwondo Championships silver medalist, 1991 SEA Games gold medalist, 1993 SEA Games bronze medalist

== Track and Field ==
=== Notable players ===
- Susano Erang - 1977 SEA Games (silver - shot put), 1983 SEA Games (bronze - shot put),
- Archand Christian Bagsit - 2011 SEA Games (silver - 400m & gold - 4x400m relay), 2013 SEA Games (gold - 400m & 4x400m relay), 2015 SEA Games (silver - 4x400m relay), 2017 SEA Games (bronze - 4x400m relay & 4x100m relay)

== Association football ==
=== History ===
Letran College had organized its own football team in 1910, known as the Letran Athletic Association. The team, nicknamed "The Bohemians", won the national championship in the years up to 1917. Team was led by Joaquín Loyzaga Sr. and Letran Football Hall of Famer, Joaquin Lopez. Then, it joined the La Liga Catolica where it competed against other Catholic schools. The Letran Booters joined the NCAA in 1932.

The Letran Booters won several titles in the NCAA, most notably during the 1980s, when they beat a favored Mapua team with Taiwanese and foreign-bred players.

In season 2002, its juniors team, the Letran Squires, won the NCAA title in a clean sweep manner, beating everyone and winning all of their matches. The title was won in dramatic fashion, as the final match against PCU went into extra time, and Letran scoring the golden goal to clinch the title. During this season, the Letran Squires only managed to concede one goal in the whole competition. This team was coached by Bernie Cordero and Perival Acabado and a double MVP award were given to Bobby Durano (Forward) and Bryan Alvarez (Attacking Midfield).

Due to financial restraints, Letran College discontinued the seniors football program in 2003. In 2018, the seniors football team was re-established.

=== Notable players ===
- Antonio "Tony" Chua - Juniors and Seniors Division (The first Filipino Football player to play in the Japanese Football League)

== Chess ==
Letran has a total of 20 NCAA chess championship titles, second to San Sebastian with 23 titles. In the seniors division, the Knights have won six championships. Their last championship run was during the 2009-10 season, where they beat the two-time defending champions CSB Blazers. Letran's Chester Brian Guerrero was named Most Valuable Player.

In the juniors division, the Squires have won 14 NCAA titles, the most in the league. Their last championship was during the 2017-2018 season, winning back-to-back titles.

== Swimming ==
The Letran swimming team is called the Aqua Knights. The seniors' team last won the NCAA championship in 1986-87 season, while the juniors' team last won the title in 1985-86 season. Both the seniors and juniors team have won two titles each.

== Esports ==
The Letran Esports team is called the Cyberknights. The Cyberknights made history as the inaugural champions of esports in NCAA Season 100 by beating JRU in the Finals in a best-of-five series featuring Mobile Legends: Bang Bang. The team was composed of John Marcus Loyola, Aaron Jacob Corpuz, Christian Alec San Diego, George Brent Imbang, and Philip Fonzy Acera and their coach was Ken Mejillano.

== Championships ==
Letran was NCAA champion during the following seasons:

- Basketball
  - Seniors: 1938-1939, 1950-1951, 1960-1961, 1966-1967, 1970-1971, 1979-1980, 1982-1983, 1983-1984, 1984-1985, 1986-1987, 1987-1988, 1992-1993, 1998-1999, 1999-2000, 2003-2004, 2005-2006, 2015-2016, 2019-2020, 2021-2022, 2022-2023
  - Juniors: 1928-1929, 1929-1930, 1930-1931, 1931-1932, 1948-1949, 1957-1958, 1975-1976, 1979-1980, 1983-1984, 1985-1986, 1990-1991, 2001-2002, 2022-2023, 2023-2024, 2025-2026
- Volleyball
  - Men: 1981-1982, 1982–1983, 1983–1984, 1990–1991, 1991–1992, 1992–1993, 1993–1994, 1998–1999, 1999–2000, 2000–2001, 2007–2008, 2008–2009, 2009–2010
  - Women: 1977-1978, 1978–1979, 1979–1980, 1980–1981, 1997–1998, 1998–1999, 2025–2026
  - Juniors: 1985-1986, 2001–2002, 2003–2004, 2004–2005
- Beach Volleyball
  - Men: 2008-2009, 2009-2010
  - Women: 2003-2004, 2022-2023, 2023-2024, 2024-2025
- Football
  - Seniors: 1983-1984, 1985–1986, 1986–1987, 1988–1989, 1997–1998
  - Juniors: 1965-1966, 1987–1988, 1988–1989, 2001–2002
- Softball
  - Seniors: 1978-1979, 1979–1980
- Swimming
  - Seniors: 1940-41, 1986-1987
  - Juniors: 1983-1984, 1985–1986
- Tennis
  - Seniors: 1976-1976, 1984–1985, 1985–1986, 1999–2000, 2000–2001, 2001–2002
  - Juniors: 1982-1983, 1998–1999, 1999–2000, 2001–2002
- Table Tennis
  - Seniors: 1985-1986, 1989–1990, 2000–2001, 2001–2002, 2002–2003, 2003–2004
  - Juniors: 1986-1987, 1987–1988, 1988–1989, 1989–1990, 1990–1991, 1991–1992, 1997–1998, 1998–1999, 1999–2000, 2000–2001, 2001–2002
  - Women's: 1998-1999, 1999–2000, 2001–2002, 2002–2003, 2003–2004
- Track & Field
  - Seniors: 1978-1979, 1989–1990, 1997–1998, 1998–1999, 1999–2000
  - Juniors: 1984-1985, 1986–1987, 2001–2001, 2001–2002, 2007–2008
- Chess
  - Seniors: 1978-1979, 1979–1980, 1981–1982, 1985–1986, 2003-2004, 2009-2010
  - Juniors: 1983-1984, 1987–1988, 1999–2000, 2000–2001, 2001–2002
- Esports
  - Seniors: 2025
- General Championships:
  - Seniors: 1979, 1997, 1998, 1999, 2000, 2001, 2002, 2003, 2009
  - Juniors: 1983, 1985, 1986, 1987, 1999, 2000, 2001, 2002
