= NCAA volleyball championships =

NCAA Volleyball
- Sport: Volleyball
- Founded: 1924
- No. of teams: 36 teams: 10 - Men's; 10 - Women's; 10 - Boys'; 7 - Girls'
- Most recent champions: Season 101 (2025–26) Men's – Benilde Blazing Spikers; Women's – Letran Lady Knights; Boys' – Malayan Junior Spikers Girls' – Perpetual Junior Lady Altas
- Most titles: Men's division: University of Perpetual Help System DALTA (14 titles); Women's division: San Sebastian College–Recoletos (23 titles); Boys' division: San Sebastian College–Recoletos (15 titles); Girls' division: University of Perpetual Help System DALTA (2 titles)

The National Collegiate Athletic Association volleyball tournament occurs every second semester of the academic year. It is divided into three divisions: the Juniors division for high school male students and the Seniors division which is subdivided into Men's Senior division for male college students and Women's Senior division for female college students. The tournament attracts numerous teams from various schools, fostering a highly competitive environment. It serves as a platform for young athletes to showcase their talents and gain valuable experience in high-level matches.

== Teams ==
School	Seniors		Juniors	
School	Men	Women	Boys	Girls
Arellano	Chiefs	Lady Chiefs	Braves	Lady Braves
Letran	Knights	Lady Knights	Squires	—N/a
Benilde	Blazing Spikers	Lady Blazers	Greenies	Lady Greenies
EAC	Generals	Lady Generals	EAC–ICA Brigadiers	EAC–ICA Lady Brigadiers
JRU	Heavy Bombers	Lady Bombers	Light Bombers	Light Lady Bombers
Lyceum	Pirates	Lady Pirates	Junior Pirates	Junior Lady Pirates
Mapúa	Cardinals	Lady Cardinals	Malayan Junior Spikers	—N/a
San Beda	Red Spikers	Lady Red Spikers	Junior Red Spikers	Baby Red Spikers
San Sebastian	Stags	Lady Stags	Staglets	Lady Staglets
Perpetual	Altas Spikers	Lady Altas	Junior Altas	Junior Lady Altas

== Champions by season ==
Triple Championships:
Denotes school won the championship in three divisions in the same year
Double Championships:
Denotes school won the championship in two divisions in the same year
Others:
Demonstration sport

Season	Men	Women	Boys	Girls
1964–65	Mapúa Institute of Technology (1)	No tournament	Not Held	No tournament
1965–66	Mapúa Institute of Technology (2)	No tournament	De La Salle College (1)	No tournament
1966–67	Mapúa Institute of Technology (3)	No tournament	De La Salle College (2)	No tournament
1967–68	Mapúa Institute of Technology (4)	No tournament	Ateneo de Manila University (1)	No tournament
1968–69	Mapúa Institute of Technology (5)	No tournament	San Beda College (1)	No tournament
1969–70	Mapúa Institute of Technology (6)	No tournament	Ateneo de Manila University (2)	No tournament
1970–71	Mapúa Institute of Technology (7)	No tournament	San Beda College (2)	No tournament
1971–72	San Sebastian College–Recoletos (1)	No tournament	La Salle Green Hills (1)	No tournament
1972–73	San Sebastian College–Recoletos (2)	No tournament	Ateneo de Manila University (3)	No tournament
1973–74	Not held	No tournament	Not held	No tournament
1974–75	Mapúa Institute of Technology (8)	No tournament	Ateneo de Manila University (4)	No tournament
1975–76	Ateneo de Manila University (1)	De La Salle University (1)	Ateneo de Manila University (5)	No tournament
1976–77	Ateneo de Manila University (2)	Ateneo de Manila University (1)	Ateneo de Manila University (6)	No tournament
1977–78	De La Salle University (1)	Colegio de San Juan de Letran (1)	La Salle Green Hills (2)	No tournament
1978–79	De La Salle University (2)	Colegio de San Juan de Letran (2)	La Salle Green Hills (3)	No tournament
1979–80	De La Salle University (3)	Colegio de San Juan de Letran (3)	La Salle Green Hills (4)	No tournament
1980–81	De La Salle University (4)	Colegio de San Juan de Letran (4)	La Salle Green Hills (5)	No tournament
1981–82	Colegio de San Juan de Letran (1)	Colegio de San Juan de Letran (5)	Trinity College of Quezon City (1)	No tournament
1982–83	Colegio de San Juan de Letran (2)	San Sebastian College–Recoletos (1)	Trinity College of Quezon City (2)	No tournament
1983–84	Colegio de San Juan de Letran (3)	San Sebastian College–Recoletos (2)	Colegio de San Juan de Letran (1)	No tournament
1984–85	San Sebastian College–Recoletos (3)	San Sebastian College–Recoletos (3)	San Sebastian College–Recoletos (1)	No tournament
1985–86	Perpetual Help College of Rizal (1)	Colegio de San Juan de Letran (6)	Colegio de San Juan de Letran (2)	No tournament
1986–87	Perpetual Help College of Rizal (2)	San Sebastian College–Recoletos (4)	San Sebastian College–Recoletos (2)	No tournament
1987–88	Perpetual Help College of Rizal (3)	San Sebastian College–Recoletos (5)	Perpetual Help College of Rizal (1)	No tournament
1988–89	Perpetual Help College of Rizal (4)	San Sebastian College–Recoletos (6)	Perpetual Help College of Rizal (2)	No tournament
1989–90	Perpetual Help College of Rizal (5)	Not Held	Perpetual Help College of Rizal (3)	No tournament
1990–91	Colegio de San Juan de Letran (4)	San Sebastian College–Recoletos (7)	Perpetual Help College of Rizal (4)	No tournament
1991–92	Colegio de San Juan de Letran (5)	San Sebastian College–Recoletos (8)	San Beda College (3)	No tournament
1992–93	Colegio de San Juan de Letran (6)	San Sebastian College–Recoletos (9)	San Beda College (4)	No tournament
1993–94	Colegio de San Juan de Letran (7)	San Sebastian College–Recoletos (10)	San Sebastian College–Recoletos (3)	No tournament
1994–95	San Sebastian College–Recoletos (4)	San Sebastian College–Recoletos (11)	San Sebastian College–Recoletos (4)	No tournament
1995–96	San Sebastian College–Recoletos (5)	San Sebastian College–Recoletos (12)	San Sebastian College–Recoletos (5)	No tournament
1996–97	San Sebastian College–Recoletos (6)	San Sebastian College–Recoletos (13)	San Sebastian College–Recoletos (6)	No tournament
1997–98	Mapúa Institute of Technology (9)	Colegio de San Juan de Letran (7)	San Sebastian College–Recoletos (7)	No tournament
1998–99	Colegio de San Juan de Letran (8)	Colegio de San Juan de Letran (8)	San Sebastian College–Recoletos (8)	No tournament
1999–00	Colegio de San Juan de Letran (9)	San Sebastian College–Recoletos (14)	San Sebastian College–Recoletos (9)	No tournament
2000–01	Colegio de San Juan de Letran (10)	San Sebastian College–Recoletos (15)	San Sebastian College–Recoletos (10)	No tournament
2001–02	Mapúa Institute of Technology (10)	San Sebastian College–Recoletos (16)	Colegio de San Juan de Letran (3)	No tournament
2002–03	San Sebastian College–Recoletos (7)	San Sebastian College–Recoletos (17)	San Sebastian College–Recoletos (11)	No tournament
2003–04	San Sebastian College–Recoletos (8)	Philippine Christian University (1)	Colegio de San Juan de Letran (4)	No tournament
2004–05	San Sebastian College–Recoletos (9)	Philippine Christian University (2)	Colegio de San Juan de Letran (5)	No tournament
2005–06	Philippine Christian University (1)	San Sebastian College–Recoletos (18)	San Sebastian College–Recoletos (12)	No tournament
2006–07	Philippine Christian University (2)	San Sebastian College–Recoletos (19)	San Sebastian College–Recoletos (13)	No tournament
2007–08	Colegio de San Juan de Letran (11)	San Sebastian College–Recoletos (20)	San Sebastian College–Recoletos (14)	No tournament
2008–09	Colegio de San Juan de Letran (12)	San Sebastian College–Recoletos (21)	San Sebastian College–Recoletos (15)	No tournament
2009–10	Colegio de San Juan de Letran (13)	San Sebastian College–Recoletos (22)	University of Perpetual Help System DALTA (5)	No tournament
2010–11	University of Perpetual Help System DALTA (6)	San Sebastian College–Recoletos (23)	University of Perpetual Help System DALTA (6)	No tournament
2011–12	University of Perpetual Help System DALTA (7)	University of Perpetual Help System DALTA (1)	EAC–Immaculate Conception Academy (1)	No tournament
2012–13	University of Perpetual Help System DALTA (8)	University of Perpetual Help System DALTA (2)	EAC–Immaculate Conception Academy (2)	No tournament
2013–14	University of Perpetual Help System DALTA (9)	University of Perpetual Help System DALTA (3)	EAC–Immaculate Conception Academy (3)	No tournament
2014–15	Emilio Aguinaldo College (1)	Arellano University (1)	University of Perpetual Help System DALTA (7)	No tournament
2015–16	University of Perpetual Help System DALTA (10)	De La Salle–College of Saint Benilde (1)	University of Perpetual Help System DALTA (8)	No tournament
2016–17	De La Salle–College of Saint Benilde (1)	Arellano University (2)	University of Perpetual Help System DALTA (9)	No tournament
2017–18	University of Perpetual Help System DALTA (11)	Arellano University (3)	University of Perpetual Help System DALTA (10)	No tournament
2018–19	University of Perpetual Help System DALTA (12)	Arellano University (4)	University of Perpetual Help System DALTA (11)	No tournament
2019–20	Cancelled due to COVID-19 pandemic			
2020–21	Cancelled due to COVID-19 pandemic			
2021–22	Cancelled due to COVID-19 pandemic	De La Salle–College of Saint Benilde (2)	Cancelled due to COVID-19 pandemic	
2022–23	University of Perpetual Help System DALTA (13)	De La Salle–College of Saint Benilde (3)	University of Perpetual Help System DALTA (12)	EAC–Immaculate Conception Academy (1)
2023–24	University of Perpetual Help System DALTA (14)	De La Salle–College of Saint Benilde (4)	Malayan High School of Science (1)	University of Perpetual Help System DALTA (1)
2024–25	Arellano University (1)	De La Salle–College of Saint Benilde (5)	University of Perpetual Help System DALTA (13)	Arellano University (1)
2025–26	De La Salle–College of Saint Benilde (2)	Colegio de San Juan de Letran (9)	Malayan High School of Science (2)	University of Perpetual Help System DALTA (2)
2026–27				

== Number of championships by school ==
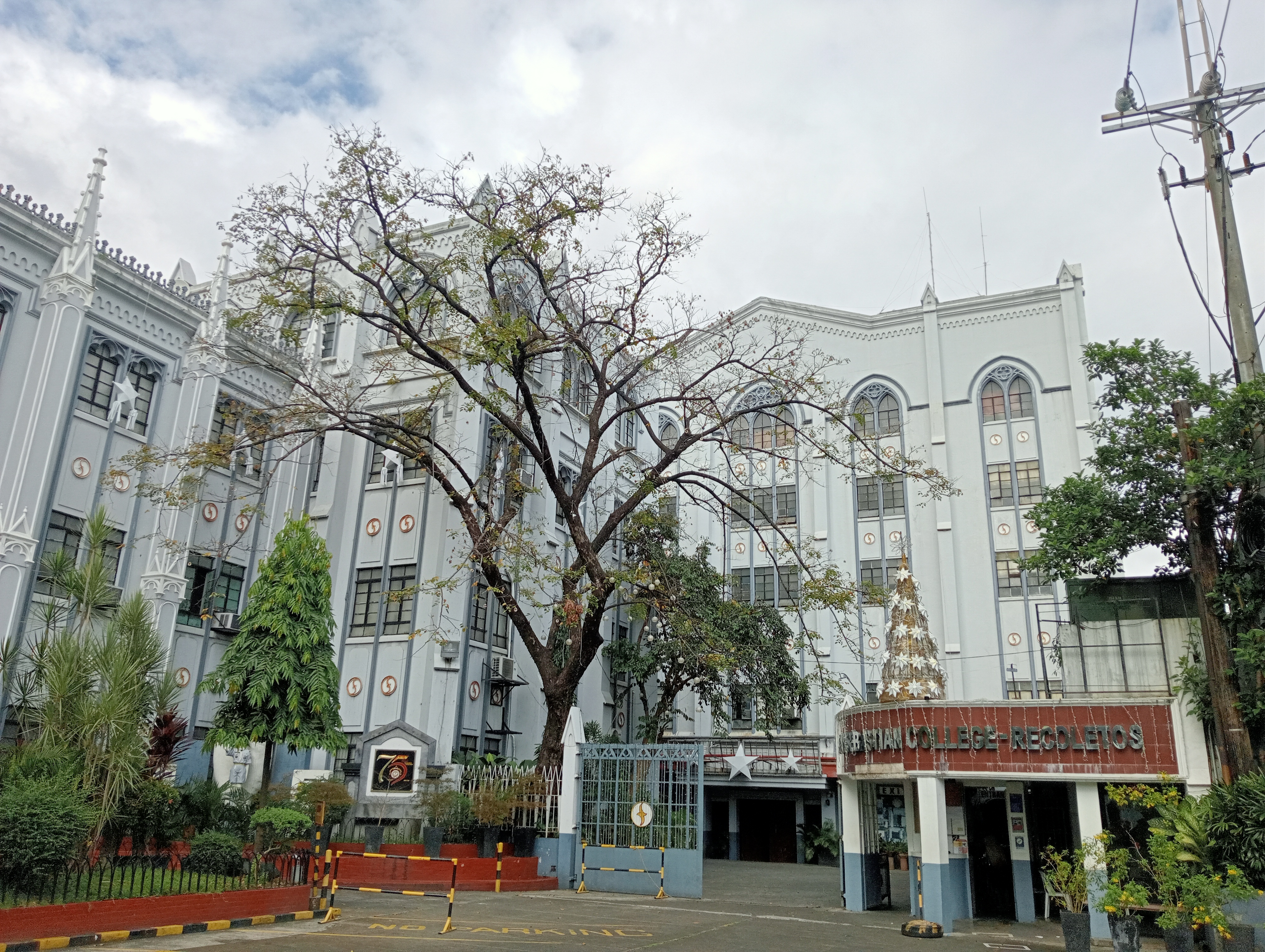
San Sebastian is the winningest team in both the women's (23 titles) and boys’ (15 titles) divisions. With nine more championships in the men's division, the school owns a league-best 47 volleyball titles overall and holds the record for the longest women's winning streak at 10 straight championships.

Perpetual is the defending champion and the winningest team in the girls division with 2 titles and also the winningest in the men's division with 14 titles, and has added 3 championships in the women's division and 13 in the boys’ division.

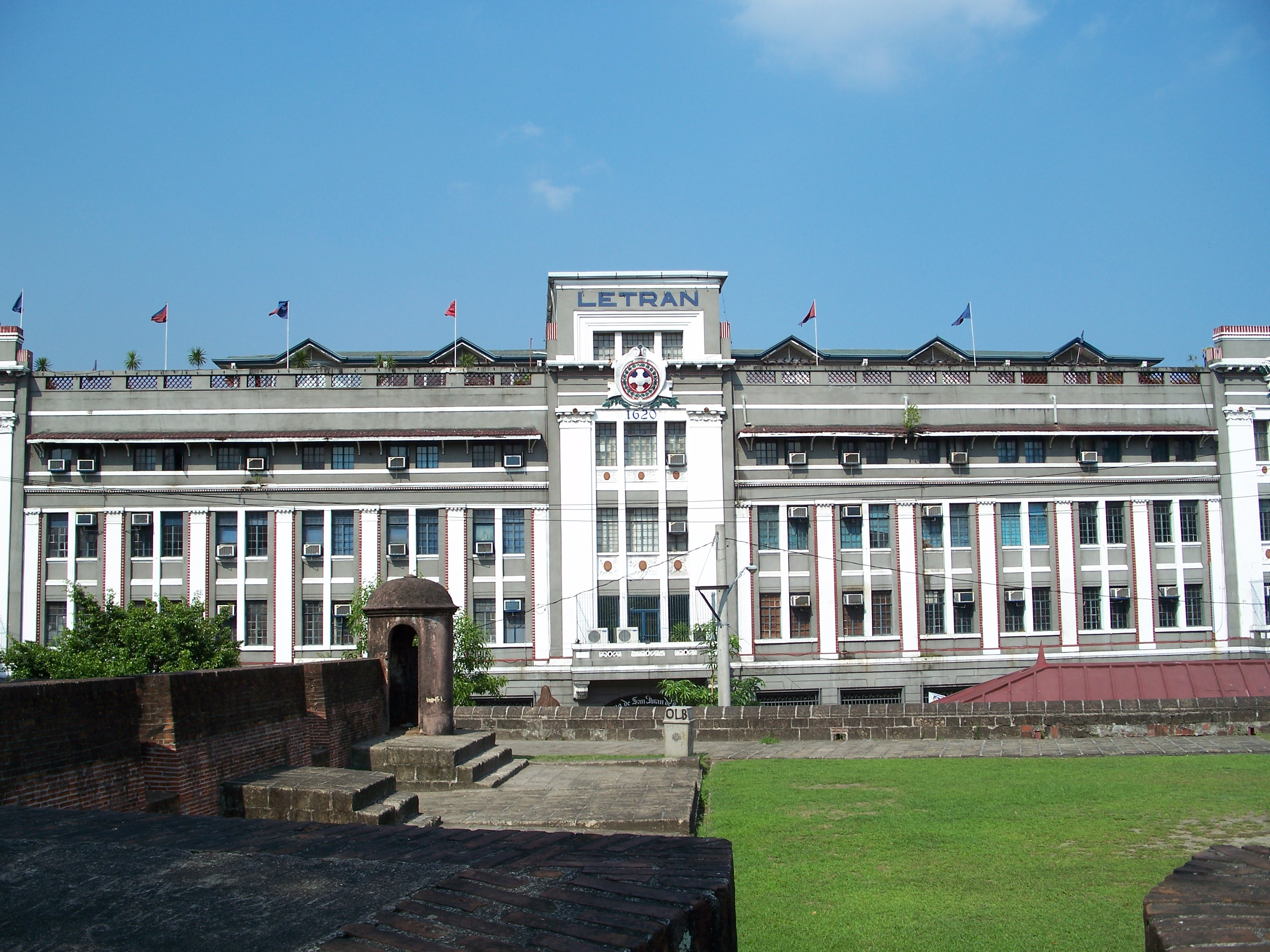
Letran has won 13 titles in the men's division, 8 titles in the women's division, and 5 titles in the boys' division.

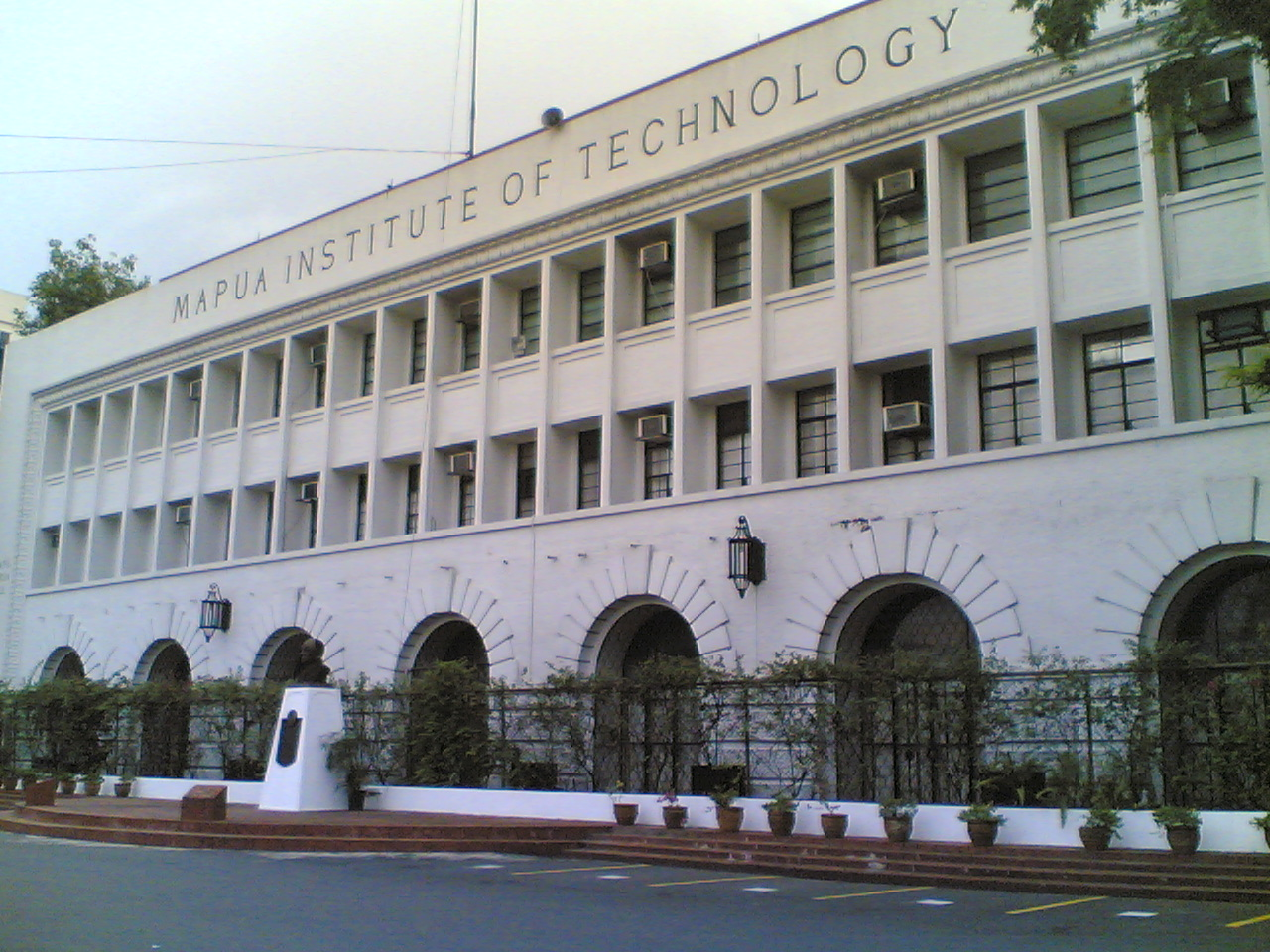
Mapúa won the inaugural men's volleyball championship and has 10 titles in the men's division. The Malayan High School of Science represents Mapúa in the juniors division and won its first title in 2014.

Benilde is the four-time defending champion in the women's division. The school has won five women's titles overall and one championship in the men's division.

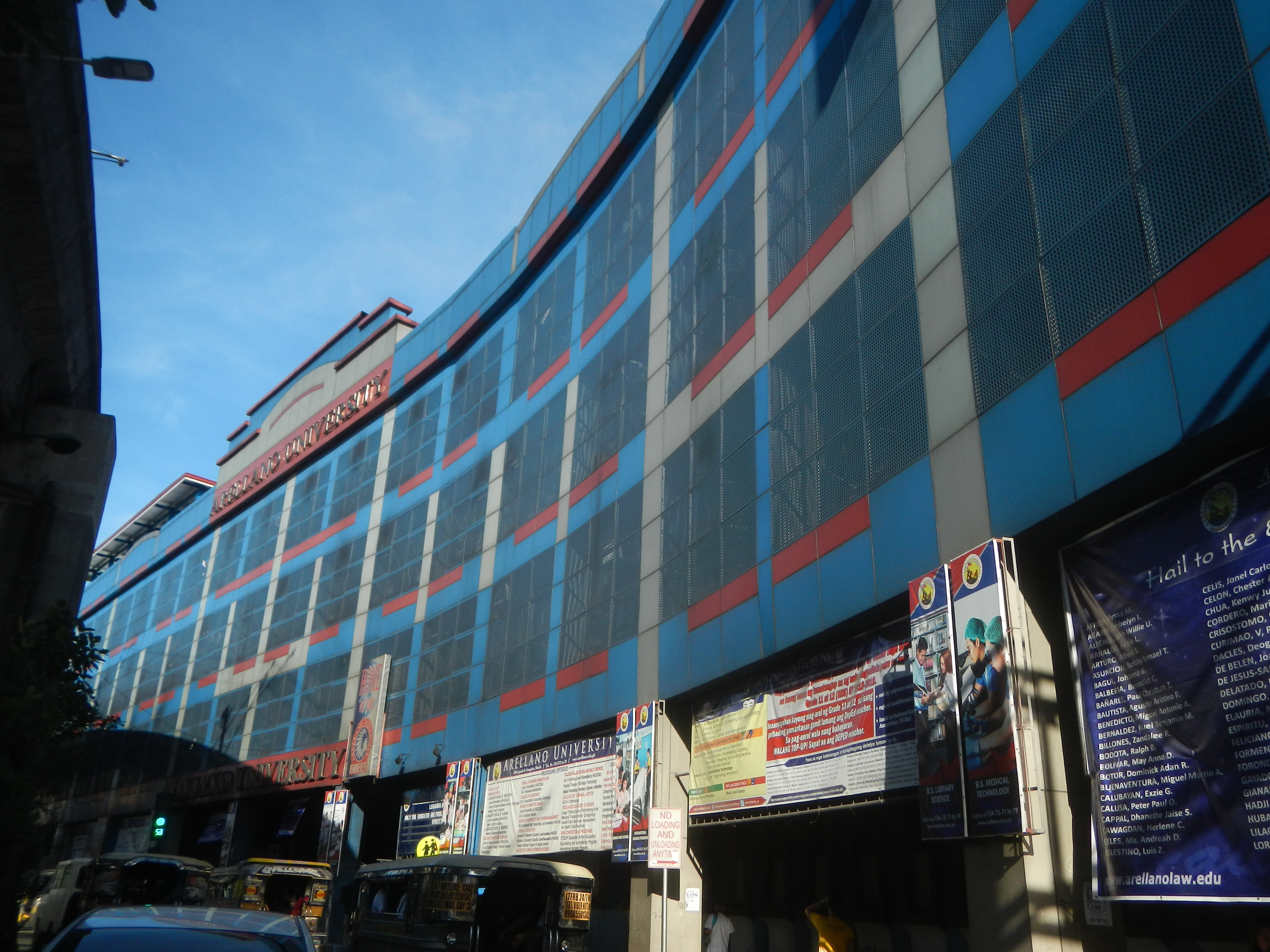
Arellano captured its first titles for the men's and girls’ divisions in Season 100. The school also owns four championships in the women's division.

EAC won the inaugural girls division championship in 2023. They have won three championships in the boys' division and one in the men's division.

School	Seniors'		Juniors'		Total	Last volleyball championship
School	M	W	B	G	Total	Last volleyball championship
San Sebastian College–Recoletos	9	23	15	0	47	Season 86 (2010–11) women's division
University of Perpetual Help System DALTA	14	3	13	2	32	Season 101 (2025–26) girls' division
Colegio de San Juan de Letran	13	9	5	0	26	Season 101 (2025–26) Women's division
Mapúa University (Note: The Mapúa High School was closed down in 2005. Since 2008, the Malayan High School of Science Red Robins represented Mapúa University in the juniors' division.)	10	0	2	0	12	Season 101 (2025–26) boys' division
De La Salle–College of Saint Benilde (Note: LSGH won its five championships under the junior team of DLSU. Currently, they play under De La Salle-College of Saint Benilde as their junior team.)	2	5	0	0	7	Season 101 (2025–26) men's division
Arellano University	1	4	0	1	6	Season 100 (2024–25) men's division
Emilio Aguinaldo College	1	0	3	1	5	Season 98 (2022–23) girls' division
La Salle Green Hills	0	0	5	0	5	Season 56 (1980–81) boys' division
San Beda University	0	0	4	0	4	Season 68 (1992–93) boys' division
Ateneo de Manila University	2	1	6	0	9	Season 52 (1976–77) men's division
De La Salle University	4	1	2	0	7	Season 56 (1980–81) men's division
Philippine Christian University	2	2	0	0	4	Season 82 (2006–07) men's division
Trinity College of Quezon City	0	0	2	0	2	Season 58 (1982–83) boys' division

== Statistics (Final Four Era) ==
=== Longest championship streaks ===
Division	Team	Streak	Duration	
Division	Team	Streak	from	until
Men's	Mapúa Institute of Technology	7	Season 40 (1965)	Season 46 (1971)
Women's	San Sebastian College–Recoletos	10	Season 62 (1987)	Season 72 (1997)
Boys'	San Sebastian College–Recoletos	8	Season 69 (1994)	Season 76 (2001)
Girls'
Girls'	Arellano University	1	Season 100 (2025)	Season 100 (2025)
Girls'	EAC–Immaculate Conception Academy	1	Season 98 (2023)	Season 98 (2023)
Girls'	University of Perpetual Help System DALTA	1	Season 99 (2024)	Season 99 (2024)
Girls'	University of Perpetual Help System DALTA	1	Season 101 (2026)	Season 101 (2026)

=== Elimination Round Sweeps ===
Division	Team	Season(s)	Pld	Total
Men's	University of Perpetual Help System DALTA	87 (2012)	9	6
Men's	University of Perpetual Help System DALTA	89 (2014)	9	6
Men's	University of Perpetual Help System DALTA	93 (2018)	9	6
Men's	University of Perpetual Help System DALTA	94 (2019)	9	6
Men's	University of Perpetual Help System DALTA	95 (2020)	9	6
Men's	University of Perpetual Help System DALTA	98 (2023)	9	6
Men's	Arellano University	86 (2011)	8	1
Women's	San Sebastian College–Recoletos	83 (2008)	8	4
Women's	San Sebastian College–Recoletos	86 (2011)	8	4
Women's	San Sebastian College–Recoletos	91 (2016)	9	4
Women's	San Sebastian College–Recoletos	92 (2017)	9	4
Women's	De La Salle–College of Saint Benilde	97 (2022)	9	3
Women's	De La Salle–College of Saint Benilde	98 (2023)	9	3
Women's	De La Salle–College of Saint Benilde	99 (2024)	9	3
Women's	University of Perpetual Help System DALTA	87 (2012)	9	1
Women's	Colegio de San Juan de Letran	101 (2026)	13	1
Boys'	University of Perpetual Help System DALTA	83 (2008)	7	5
Boys'	University of Perpetual Help System DALTA	86 (2011)	7	5
Boys'	University of Perpetual Help System DALTA	89 (2014)	7	5
Boys'	University of Perpetual Help System DALTA	98 (2023)	3	5
Boys'	University of Perpetual Help System DALTA	100 (2025)	9	5
Boys'	Lyceum of the Philippines University–Cavite	92 (2017)	7	1
Boys'	EAC–Immaculate Conception Academy	87 (2012)	7	1
Boys'	San Sebastian College–Recoletos	85 (2010)	7	1
Girls'	Arellano University	95 (2020)^{a}	3	3
Girls'	Arellano University	98 (2023)	3	3
Girls'	Arellano University	99 (2024)	5	3
Girls'	University of Perpetual Help System DALTA	100 (2025)	6	2
Girls'	University of Perpetual Help System DALTA	101 (2026)	6	2

Notes:

a. The Arellano Lady Braves swept the single elimination round, however, NCAA Season 95 volleyball tournaments were discontinued due to the COVID-19 pandemic in the Philippines.

=== Longest Final Four appearance streaks ===
Division	Team	Streak	Duration	
Division	Team	Streak	from	until
Men's	University of Perpetual Help System DALTA	13	Season 84 (2009)	Season 99 (2024)
Women's	San Sebastian College–Recoletos	19	Season 74 (1999)	Season 92 (2017)
Boys'	San Sebastian College–Recoletos	18	Season 74 (1999)	Season 91 (2016)
Girls'	Arellano University; Lyceum of the Philippines University–Cavite; University of Perpetual Help System DALTA	5	Season 95 (2020)	Season 101 (2026)

=== Longest championship droughts ===
Team	Seniors		Juniors	
Team	Men's	Women's	Boys'	Girls'
Arellano University	1 year, since 2025	7 years, since 2019	17 years, since 2009	1 year, since 2025
Colegio de San Juan de Letran	16 years, since 2010	0 year, since 2026	21 years, since 2005	7 years, since 2019
De La Salle–College of Saint Benilde	0 years, since 2026	1 year, since 2025	28 years, since 1998	7 years, since 2019
Emilio Aguinaldo College	11 years, since 2015	17 years, since 2009	12 years, since 2014	3 years, since 2023
José Rizal University	62 years, since 1964	51 years, since 1975	61 years, since 1965	7 years, since 2019
Lyceum of the Philippines University	15 years, since 2011	15 years, since 2011	15 years, since 2011	7 years, since 2019
Mapúa University	51 years, since 1975	51 years, since 1975	0 years, since 2026	7 years, since 2019
San Beda University	62 years, since 1964	51 years, since 1975	33 years, since 1993	7 years, since 2019
San Sebastian College–Recoletos	21 years, since 2005	15 years, since 2012	17 years, since 2009	7 years, since 2019
University of Perpetual Help System DALTA	3 years, since 2023	12 years, since 2014	1 year, since 2025	0 year, since 2026

== Special awards ==
=== Most valuable players ===
NCAA Season	Seniors' division		Juniors' division	
NCAA Season	Men's division	Women's division	Boys' division	Girls' division
74 (1998–99)		Mayeth Carolino		No tournament
75 (1999–2000)				No tournament
76 (2000–01)				No tournament
77 (2001–02)				No tournament
78 (2002–03)				No tournament
79 (2003–04)				No tournament
80 (2004–05)				No tournament
81 (2005–06)				No tournament
82 (2006–07)	Eric John Genil	Joy Pulido	Nelson Rivera Jr.	No tournament
83 (2007–08)				No tournament
84 (2008–09)	Warren Pirante	Laurence Ann Latigay	Patrick John Rojas	No tournament
85 (2009–10)	Warren Pirante	Analyn Joy Benito	John Erickson Francisco	No tournament
86 (2010–11)		Analyn Joy Benito		No tournament
87 (2011–12)	Marcelo Joaquin Jr.	Sandra delos Santos		No tournament
88 (2012–13)	Edmar Sanchez (Season) (Finals)	Norie Jane Diaz (Season) (Finals)	Jopet Adrian Movido (Season) (Finals)	No tournament
89 (2013–14)	Jay Rojo Dela Cruz (Season & Finals)	Honey Royse Tubino (Season & Finals)	Niño Joson (Season); Ishmael Rivera (Finals)	No tournament
90 (2014–15)	Howard Mojica (Season & Finals)	Grethcel Soltones (Season); Menchie Tubiera (Finals)	Jomaru Amagan (Season); Ricky Marcos (Finals)	No tournament
91 (2015–16)	Howard Mojica (Season); Rey Taneo Jr. (Finals)	Grethcel Soltones (Season); Jeanette Panaga (Finals)	Ralph Joshua Pitogo (Season); Jody Severo (Finals)	No tournament
92 (2016–17)	John Vic De Guzman (Season); Isaiah Arda (Finals)	Grethcel Soltones (Season); Jovielyn Prado (Finals)	Genesis Allan Redido (Season) (Finals)	No tournament
93 (2017–18)	Joebert Almodiel (Season); Rey Taneo Jr. (Finals)	Maria Shola May Alvarez (Season); Regine Anne Arocha (Finals)	Kirk Patrick Rosos (Season); Jody Margaux Severo (Finals)	No tournament
94 (2018–19)	Joebert Almodiel (Season & Finals)	Necole Ebuen (Season); Regine Anne Arocha (Finals)	Christian Dela Cruz (Season); Hero Austria (Finals)	No tournament
95 (2019–20)	Cancelled due to COVID-19 pandemic			
96 (2020–21)	Cancelled due to COVID-19 pandemic			
97 (2021–22)	Cancelled due to COVID-19 pandemic	Francis Mycah Go (Season); Jhasmine Gayle Pascual (Finals)	Cancelled due to COVID-19 pandemic	
98 (2022–23)	Louie Ramirez (Season & Finals)	Mary Rhose Dapol (Season); Jade Gentapa (Finals)	(Season) (Finals)	(Season) (Finals)
99 (2023–24)	Louie Ramirez (Season); Jefferson Marapoc (Finals)	Cloanne Sophia Mondoñedo (Season); Jhasmine Gayle Pascual (Finals)	Rodan Aguirre (Season); Charles Jordan Segui (Finals)	Samantha Hillary Maranan (Season); Jemalyn Menor (Finals)
100 (2024–25)	Rocky Roy Motol (Season); Carl Justin Berdal (Finals)	Francis Mycah Go (Season & Finals)	Kim Cris Liray (Season); John Weihanan Lat (Finals)	Samantha Hillary Maranan (Season & Finals)
101 (2025–26)	Axel Van Book (Season); Reymark Betco (Finals)	Zamantha Nolasco (Season); Marie Judiel Nitura (Finals)	Roderick Medino (Season) & (Finals)	Catherine Chu (Season); Elizha Sildo (Finals)

=== Rookie of the Year ===
NCAA Season	Seniors' division		Juniors' division	
NCAA Season	Men's division	Women's division	Boys' division	Girls' division
73 (1997–98)		Mayeth Carolino		No tournament
74 (1998–99)				No tournament
75 (1999–2000)				No tournament
76 (2000–01)				No tournament
77 (2001–02)				No tournament
78 (2002–03)				No tournament
79 (2003–04)				No tournament
80 (2004–05)				No tournament
81 (2005–06)				No tournament
82 (2006–07)				No tournament
83 (2007–08)				No tournament
84 (2008–09)				No tournament
85 (2009–10)				No tournament
86 (2010–11)				No tournament
87 (2011–12)				No tournament
88 (2012–13)				No tournament
89 (2013–14)	John Vic De Guzman	Angela Macabalitao	Ishmael Rivera	No tournament
90 (2014–15)	Randean Philippe Abcede	Nikka Marielle Dalisay	Jomaru Amagan	No tournament
91 (2015–16)	Walt Amber Gervacio	Nieza Viray	Ralph Joshua Pitogo	No tournament
92 (2016–17)	Joshua Mina	Francesca Racraquin	Juciv Colina	No tournament
93 (2017–18)	Joebert Almodiel	Necole Ebuen	Arnel Christian Aguilar	No tournament
94 (2018–19)	Ruvince Abrot	Lynne Robyn Matias	Eljie Jaballa	No tournament
95 (2019–20)	Cancelled due to COVID-19 pandemic			
96 (2020–21)	Cancelled due to COVID-19 pandemic			
97 (2021–22)	Cancelled due to COVID-19 pandemic	Katherine Santos	Cancelled due to COVID-19 pandemic	
98 (2022–23)	Vince Himzon	Shaila Omipon		
99 (2023–24)	Axel Van Book	Angel Mae Habacon	Rayvhan Costello	Catherine Chu
100 (2024–25)	Rocky Roy Motol	Sheena Vanessa Sarie	Not awarded	Not awarded
101 (2025–26)	Marc Lemuel Tangon	Camilla Amor Bartolome	Roderick Medino	Elizha Sildo

== Individual awards ==
=== Men's Division ===
NCAA Season	Awards						
NCAA Season	Best Scorer	Best Attacker	Best Blocker	Best Setter	Best Server	Best Receiver	Best Digger
85 (2009–10)	Warren Pirante	Rocky Honrade	Rocky Honrade	Renz Ordoñez	Mardy Galang	Von Mabazza	Randall Compio
86 (2010–11)							
87 (2011–12)	Lorenzo Capate Jr.	Reggie Espeleta	Jay R De La Cruz	Dexter Clamor	James Christian Lorca	Sandy Montero	Sandy Montero
88 (2012–13)	Howard Mojica	Gilbert Ablan	Adam Daquer	Francis Allen Yu	Paolo Tacorda	Sandy Montero	Pocholo Apostol
89 (2013–14)	Howard Mojica	John Vic De Guzman	John Vic De Guzman	Glacy Ralph Diezmo	Philip Michael Bagalay	Juvie Mark Mangaring	Juvie Mark Mangaring
90 (2014–15)	Howard Mojica	Howard Mojica	Kimmuel Samonte	Warren Catipay	Neil Barry Ytorzaita	Juvie Mangarin	Juvie Mangarin
91 (2015–16)	Howard Mojica	Howard Mojica	Angelino Pertierra	John Carlos Desuyo	Howard Mojica	Ajian Dy	Dion Canlas

NCAA Season	Awards							
NCAA Season	1st Best Outside Hitter	2nd Best Outside Hitter	1st Best Middle Blocker	2nd Best Middle Blocker	Best Opposite Hitter	Best Setter	Best Libero	Best Server
92 (2016–17)	Adrian Viray	John Joseph Cabillan	Kevin Liberato	Limuel Patenio	John Vic De Guzman	Relan Taneo Jr.	Jack Kalingking	
93 (2017–18)	Joebert Almodiel	Christian Dela Paz	Kevin Liberato	Limuel Patenio	Mark Christian Encisco	Warren Lewis Catipay	Jack Kalingking	
94 (2018–19)	Joebert Almodiel	Joshua Mina	Ronniel Rosales	Francis Basilan	Jesrael Liberato	Kevin Magsino	Joshua Magadan	
95 (2019–20)	Cancelled due to COVID-19 pandemic							
96 (2020–21)	Cancelled due to COVID-19 pandemic							
97 (2021–22)	Cancelled due to COVID-19 pandemic							
98 (2022–23)	Barbie San Andres	Joshua Ramilo	Vince Himzon	Jethro Cabilan	Joshua Zareno	Adrian Villados	Bhim Diones	Not awarded
99 (2023–24)	Axel Van Book	Louie Ramirez	Vince Himzon	KC Andrade	Jan Ruther Abor	Adrian Villados	Bhim Diones	Not awarded
100 (2024–25)	Rocky Roy Motol	Barbie San Andres	Vince Himzon	John Adriane Austero	Kobe Brian Tabuga	John Wayne Araño	Aidien Josh Rus	Not awarded
101 (2025–26)	Rocky Roy Motol	John Derrick Bautista	Vince Himzon	Jester Bornel	Reymark Betco	Laurence Andrei Salvo	Ace Buenaventura	Not awarded

=== Women's Division ===
NCAA Season	Awards						
NCAA Season	Best Scorer	Best Attacker	Best Blocker	Best Setter	Best Server	Best Receiver	Best Digger
85 (2009–10)	Giza Yumang	Giza Yumang	Melissa Mirasol	Keshia de Luna	Norie Jane Diaz	Margarita Pepito	Angelique Dionela
86 (2010–11)							
87 (2011–12)	Annalyn Joy Benito	Sandra De Los Santos	Dafna Robinos	Arianne Argarin	Annabelle Dionela	Angelique Dionela	Mae Denise Crisostomo
88 (2012–13)	Grethcel Soltones	Honey Royse Tubino	Frances Molina	Djanel Cheng	Ivy Angeline Carlos	Mae Denise Crisostomo	Mae Denise Crisostomo
89 (2013–14)	Honey Royse Tubino	Christine Joy Rosario	Arian Angustia	Djanel Cheng	Janine Nicole Marciano	Rica Jane Enclona	Rica Jane Enclona
90 (2014–15)	Grethcel Soltones	Jeanette Panaga	Jeanette Panaga	Shyrra Cabriana	Shyrra Cabriana	Alyssa Eroa	Alyssa Eroa
91 (2015–16)	Grethcel Soltones	Christine Joy Rosario	Jeanette Panaga	Rhea Marist Ramirez	Maria Shola May Alvarez	Melanie Torres	Alyssa Eroa

NCAA Season	Awards						
NCAA Season	1st Best Outside Hitter	2nd Best Outside Hitter	1st Best Middle Blocker	2nd Best Middle Blocker	Best Opposite Hitter	Best Setter	Best Libero
92 (2016–17)	Grethcel Soltones	Jovielyn Prado	Ma. Lourdes Clemente	Coleen Bravo	Karen Joy Montojo	Vira Guillema	Alyssa Eroa
93 (2017–18)	Jovielyn Prado	Dolly Grace Verzosa	Ma. Lourdes Clemente	Joyce Sta. Rita	Regine Anne Arocha	Vira Guillema	Alyssa Eroa
94 (2018–19)	Cindy Imbo	Francesca Racraquin	Rachel Anne Austero	Bien Elaine Juanillo	Necole Ebuen	Lynne Robyn Matias	Daryl Racraquin
95 (2019–20)	Cancelled due to COVID-19 pandemic						
96 (2020–21)	Cancelled due to COVID-19 pandemic						
97 (2021–22)	Francis Mycah Go	Dolly Grace Verzosa	Zonxi Dahab	Alyanna Nicole Ong	Reyann Cañete	Venice Puzon	Alex Cyra Salvaloza
98 (2022–23)	Mary Rhose Dapol	Jade Gentapa	Trina Marice Abay	Janeth Tulang	Gayle Pascual	Venice Puzon	Marian Tracy Andal
99 (2023–24)	Angel Mae Habacon	Roxie Dela Cruz	Hiromi Osada	Alyana Nicole Ong	Janeth Tulang	Cloanne Sophia Mondoñedo	Lara Mae Silva
100 (2024–25)	Francis Mycah Go	Sheena Vanessa Sarie	Zamantha Nolasco	Kristine Joy Dionisio	Marie Judiel Nitura	Catherine Domasig	Lara Mae Silva
101 (2025–26)	Angel Mae Habacon	Shekaina Redge Lleses	Zamantha Nolasco	Ashley Corisse Toriado	Marie Judiel Nitura	Chenae Basarte	Lara Mae Silva

=== Boys' Division ===
NCAA Season	Awards						
NCAA Season	Best Scorer	Best Attacker	Best Blocker	Best Setter	Best Server	Best Receiver	Best Digger
87 (2011–12)	John Paul Cuzon	Eldrige Capal	Christopher Vhal Soriano	Karlo Martin Santos	Rhodney Kenneth Espejo	Jerus Moya	John Arnel Enano
88 (2012–13)	Jani Catangal	Jan Francis Ronato	John Renz Natividad	Rhodney Kenneth Espejo	Toshihiro Wada	John Arnel Enano	John Arnel Enano
89 (2013–14)	Ishmael Rivera	Jan Francis Ronato	Randean Abcede	Gabriel Casaña	Randean Abcede	Marljon Emmanuel Amparo	Marljon Emmanuel Amparo
90 (2014–15)	Jomaru Amagan	Sean Alexis Escallar	Malden Deldil	Kevin Magsino	Jomaru Amagan	Carlo Isidro	Carlo Isidro
91 (2015–16)	Aldimal Waham		Ralph Joshua Pitogo	Gabriel EJ Casana	Michael Vince Imperial	Ceejay Hicap	Barrie Roldan

NCAA Season	Awards							
NCAA Season	1st Best Outside Hitter	2nd Best Outside Hitter	1st Best Middle Blocker	2nd Best Middle Blocker	Best Opposite Hitter	Best Setter	Best Libero	Best Server
92 (2016–17)	Ederson Rebusora	Francis Casas	Valeriano Sasis III	Allen Angelo Calicdan	Robbie Pamittan	Sean Michael Escallar	Zackhaery Dablo	
93 (2017–18)	Noel Michael Kampton	Juvie Colonia	Raliuz Joezer Cantos	Gideon James Guadalupe	John Paulo Lorenzo	Michael Vince Imperial	Raxel Redd Catris	
94 (2018–19)	Christian Dela Cruz	Noel Michael Kampton	Yoj Pabiton	Kirth Rosos	John Paulo Lorenzo	Michael Escallar	Lance de Castro	
95 (2019–20)	Cancelled due to COVID-19 pandemic							
96 (2020–21)	Cancelled due to COVID-19 pandemic							
97 (2021–22)	Cancelled due to COVID-19 pandemic							
98 (2022–23)								
99 (2023–24)	Rodan Aguirre	Charles Jordan Segui	Liam Mojica	Louis Miguel Dela Cruz	Ace Van Robnoel	Edwin Maverick de Lima	Edmark Abalos	Not awarded
100 (2024–25)	Kim Cris Liray	Jezel Kim Nimo	Liam Mojica	Zyro Ornos	Nasty Vergel Balahadja	John Jonas Arreola	Aron Jazul	Not awarded
101 (2025–26)								Not awarded

=== Girls' Division ===
NCAA Season	Awards							
NCAA Season	1st Best Outside Hitter	2nd Best Outside Hitter	1st Best Middle Blocker	2nd Best Middle Blocker	Best Opposite Hitter	Best Setter	Best Libero	Best Server
95 (2019–20)	Cancelled due to COVID-19 pandemic							
96 (2020–21)	Cancelled due to COVID-19 pandemic							
97 (2021–22)	Cancelled due to COVID-19 pandemic							
98 (2022–23)								
99 (2023–24)	Catherine Chu	Angel Joy Perez	Laurene Alexis Yap	Rona Ria Diaz	Trisha Mae Pulmones	Jasmine Monte	Janine Espiritu	Not awarded
100 (2024–25)	Samantha Hillary Maranan	Angel Joy Perez	Julyana Servantes	Ashley Turiado	Mayang Aryana Javier	Carlyn Maneja	Liezel Canabot	Not awarded
101 (2025–26)			Isay Culanay					Not awarded

== Season rankings ==
Below are rankings per division per team:

- Number denotes playoff seeding.
- Shade denotes final position.

=== Men's division ===
Team	NCAA Season																											
Team	74	75	76	77	78	79	80	81	82	83	84	85	86	87	88	89	90	91	92	93	94	95	96	97	98	99	100	101 (Note: In the 101st season, teams were split into two groups for a three-phase classification round: a single round-robin, a crossover stage, and a final intra-group phase. Teams then advanced to a play-in tournament, where the top two teams in each group had a twice-to-beat advantage. Quarterfinal winners moved on to best-of-three semifinals, with semifinal winners contesting a best-of-three finals and the losers playing a single game for third place.)
AUF Great Danes (Note: AUF pulled out of the league in 2010.)	--											3	--															
Arellano Chiefs	--											6	1	2	7	5	4	5	4	2	3	C	C	C	2	4	3	B1
Letran Knights								3	2	1	1	4	3	5	5	6	7	9	8	10	6	C	C	C	7	3	4	B4
Benilde Blazers	--							5	?	2	3	5	5	4	8	3	3	3	1	4	2	C	C	C	8	5	1	A2
EAC Generals	--											8	6	6	3	4	1	1	9	6	4	C	C	C	4	2	8	B3
JRU Heavy Bombers								7	?	6	7	9	7	8	9	10	9	10	10	7	8	C	C	C	6	9	9	A5
Lyceum Pirates	--													7	4	9	5	6	6	9	7	C	C	C	10	10	10	B5
Mapúa Cardinals									?				9	9	10	8	6	8	5	5	10	C	C	C	5	8	2	A3
PCU Dolphins (Note: PCU pulled out of the league in 2009.)								1	1	-	6	--																
San Beda Red Lions								4	?	3	2	2	4	3	2	2	10	4	3	3	9	C	C	C	3	6	5	B2
San Sebastian Stags								2	?	4	5	7	8	10	6	7	8	7	7	8	5	C	C	C	9	7	7	A4
Perpetual Altas								6	?	5	4	1	2	1	1	1	2	2	2	1	1	C	C	C	1	1	6	A1

Legend
- Champion
- 1st Runner-up
- 2nd Runner-up
- Semifinalist, lost with twice to beat advantage
- Semifinalist, lost with twice to win disadvantage
- Qualified for 4th-seed playoff
1	Elimination round ranking
- Suspended
C	Tournament cancelled
- Not in the league
- Did not join
- Guest school
- Under probation

=== Women's division ===
Team	NCAA Season																											
Team	74	75	76	77	78	79	80	81	82	83	84	85	86	87	88	89	90	91	92	93	94	95	96	97	98	99	100	101 (Note: In the 101st season, teams were split into two groups for a three-phase classification round: an intra-group round-robin, a crossover stage between groups, and a final intra-group phase. Teams then advanced to a play-in tournament for quarterfinal spots, with the top two teams in each group holding a twice-to-beat advantage. Quarterfinal winners moved on to best-of-three semifinals, followed by a best-of-three finals, while semifinal losers played a single game for third place.)
AUF Lady Danes (Note: AUF pulled out of the league in 2010.)	--											6	--															
Arellano Lady Chiefs	--											5	6	7	4	4	1	2	2	1	2	C	C	2	6	4	3	B3
Letran Lady Knights								3	2	3	4	2	2	3	7	8	9	10	8	7	8	C	C	10	5	2	2	B1
Benilde Lady Blazers	--							4	?	2	2	4	~~1~~	8	5	3	4	4	3	6	1	C	C	1	1	1	1	A2
EAC Lady Generals	--											8	3	2	1	6	6	8	9	8	10	C	C	9	10	10	9	B5
JRU Lady Bombers									?		7	10	5	9	9	10	5	6	7	4	6	C	C	4	8	9	10	A5
Lyceum Lady Pirates	--													5	8	7	7	5	6	9	5	C	C	6	3	3	6	B4
Mapúa Lady Cardinals									?			9	7	10	10	9	8	9	10	10	9	C	C	5	4	5	4	A3
PCU Lady Dolphins (Note: PCU pulled out of the league in 2009.)								2	?	-	6	--																
San Beda Red Lionesses									?	5	5	7	4	6	6	5	10	7	4	2	3	C	C	8	9	7	8	B2
San Sebastian Lady Stags								1	1	1	1	3	1	4	3	1	2	1	1	5	7	C	C	3	7	8	7	A4
Perpetual Lady Altas								5	?	4	3	1	~~2~~	1	2	2	3	3	5	3	4	C	C	7	2	6	5	A1

=== Boys' division ===
Team	NCAA Season																											
Team	74	75	76	77	78	79	80	81	82	83	84	85	86	87	88	89	90	91	92	93	94	95 (Note: To prioritize safety during the Novel Coronavirus (COVID-19) outbreak, the NCAA management committee suspended all Season 95 sports starting February 14, 2020. This followed an earlier postponement of all junior-level games, which began on February 7, 2020.)	96	97	98	99	100	101 (Note: In the 101st season, teams were split into two groups for a three-phase classification round: an intra-group round-robin, a crossover stage between groups, and a final intra-group phase. Teams then advanced to a play-in tournament for quarterfinal spots, with the top two teams in each group holding a twice-to-beat advantage. Quarterfinal winners moved on to best-of-three semifinals, followed by a best-of-three finals, while semifinal losers played a single game for third place.)
AUF Baby Danes (Note: AUF pulled out of the league in 2010.)	--											3	--															
Arellano Braves	--											8	4	4	6	3	5	3	?	3	?	C	C	C	2	1	4	B2
Letran Squires								5	?	3	4	4	5	6	4	6	6	6	4	4	T4	C	C	C		5	2	B1
EAC–ICA Brigadiers	--											5	3	1	3	1	2	1	2	1	T4	C	C	C	4	6	6	A3
JRU Light Bombers									?									9	?	?	?	C	C	C		8	5	B3
La Salle Green Hills Greenies	--							2	?	4	3	4	7	8	8	8	7	8	?	5	?	C	C	C		9	10	A5
Lyceum Junior Pirates	--													7	5	5	1	5	1	?	T4	C	C	C	3	4	7	A4
Mapúa/Malayan Red Robins (Note: The Mapúa High School was closed down in 2005.) (Note: Since 2008, the Malayan High School of Science Red Robins represented Mapúa University in the juniors' division.)									?				8						?	?	?	C	C	C		3	3	A1
PCU Baby Dolphins (Note: PCU pulled out of the league in 2009.)								3	?	-		--																
San Beda Red Cubs									?	5	5	7	6	5	7	7	8	7	?	?	?	C	C	C		7	8	A5
San Sebastian Staglets								1	1	1	1	1	2	3	1	2	4	4	?	?	?	C	C	C			9	A4
Perpetual Junior Altas								4	2	2	2	2	1	2	2	6	3	2	3	2	1	C	C	C	1	2	1	A2

=== Girls' division ===
Team	NCAA Season						
Team	95 (Note: The NCAA halted all Season 95 events on February 14, 2020 as a safety measure. Junior-level competitions had ceased a week earlier, on February 7, 2020.)	96	97	98	99	100	101
Arellano Lady Braves	1	C	C	1	1	2	2
Letran Lady Squires		C	C				
EAC–ICA Lady Brigadiers		C	C	2	4	3	3
JRU Light Lady Bombers		C	C		5	5	7
La Salle Lady Greenies		C	C		6	7	6
Lyceum Junior Lady Pirates	4	C	C	3	3	4	4
Mapúa/Malayan Lady Red Robins		C	C				
San Beda Red Lioness Cubs		C	C			6	5
San Sebastian Lady Staglets	3	C	C				
Perpetual Junior Lady Altas	2	C	C	4	2	1	1 (Note: Perpetual swept the elimination round.)

== See also ==
- NCAA beach volleyball championships (Philippines)
- Premier Volleyball League
- UAAP Volleyball Championship
- Maharlika Pilipinas Volleyball Association
