= Perpetual Lady Altas volleyball =

Philippine volleyball team

Perpetual Lady Altas
- Nickname: Lady Altas
- Location: Alabang–Zapote Road, Las Piñas, Philippines
- Head coach: Sandy Rieta
- Captain: Razel Paula Aldea

Main league
- League: NCAA
- Season 98 (2023): 3rd

Other league/s
- League: V-League; Shakey's Super League

Championships
- NCAA: 3

The Perpetual Lady Altas is the women's collegiate volleyball teams of University of Perpetual Help System Dalta. They compete in the National Collegiate Athletic Association (NCAA).

== History ==
Perpetual Lady Altas joined NCAA in 1984. They have 3 championship titles in the NCAA. Their last championship and marked as their first 3-peat championship title in NCAA was in 2014.

The Perpetual Lady Altas also joined Shakey's Super League and V-League in 2022.

== Roster ==
Perpetual lady Altas roster (NCAA Season 98)
Number	Player	Position	Height	Birth date	High School
1	Mary Rhose Dapol	Outside Hitter	1.70 m (5 ft 7 in)		
3	Winnie Bedana	Middle Blocker			
4	Shaila Omipon	Outside Hitter		December 19, 2003 (age 22)	Sto. Niño de Praga Academy
6	Janine Padua	Opposite Hitter			
9	Charmaine Ocado	Outside Hitter			
10	Krisha Cordero	Opposite Hitter			Living Stones International School
14	Charisse Enrico	Middle Blocker			
15	Razel Paula Aldea (C)	Middle Blocker			
16	Jhasmine Sapin	Setter			
17	Joanne Lozano	Libero			
	Kaila Edilsam Reyes				
	Kathrina Arcellana				
	Marian Tracy Andal	Libero			

== Team honors ==
=== NCAA ===
Perpetual Lady Altas awards (partial)
Year	NCAA Season	Title	Ref
2009	84	3rd place	
2010	85	3rd place	
2012	87	Champions	
2013	88	Champions	
2014	89	Champions	
2018	93	3rd place	
2019	94	Runner-up	
2023	98	3rd place	

=== SSL ===
Perpetual Lady Altas awards
Season	Conference	Title	Ref
2022	Pre-Season	8th place	
2023	Invitationals	4th place	
2023	Pre-Season	9th place	

=== V-League ===
Perpetual Lady Altas awards
Season	Conference	Title	Ref
2023	Collegiate	4th place	

== Individual honors ==
=== NCAA ===
Perpetual Lady Altas Individual awards (partial)
Year	NCAA Season	Award	Player	Ref
2010	85	Best Setter	Keshia De Luna	
2010	85	Best Server	Norie Jane Diaz	
2010	85	Best Digger	Angelique Dionela	
2012	87	Most Valuable Player	Sandra delos Santos	
2012	87	Best Attacker	Sandra delos Santos	
2012	87	Best Setter	Arianne Argarin	
2012	87	Best Receiver	Angelique Dionela	
2013	88	Most Valuable Player (Season)	Norie Jane Diaz	
2013	88	Best Attacker	Honey Royse Tubino	
2014	89	Most Valuable Player (Season)	Honey Royse Tubino	
2014	89	Most Valuable Player (Finals)	Honey Royse Tubino	
2014	89	Best Attacker	Honey Royse Tubino	
2015	90	Best Setter	Shyrra Cabriana	
2015	90	Best Server	Shyrra Cabriana	
2017	92	1st Best Middle Blocker	Ma. Lourdes Clemente	
2017	92	2nd Best Middle Blocker	Coleen Bravo	
2018	93	1st Best Middle Blocker	Ma. Lourdes Clemente	
2019	94	1st Best Outside Hitter	Cindy Imbo	
2023	98	Most Valuable Player (Season)	Mary Rhose Dapol	
2023	98	1st Best Outside Hitter	Mary Rhose Dapol	
2023	98	Rookie of the Year	Shaila Omipon	
2023	98	Best Libero	Marian Tracy Andal	

== Season-by-season record ==
Records starting NCAA Season 83

Champion	Runner-up	Third place

Season	Field	Eliminations					Playoffs			Head coach	Ref.
Season	Field	Finish	GP	W	L	PCT	Round	Opponent	Result	Head coach	Ref.
2008	5	4th					Final Four	Letran Lady Knights	L		
2009	6	3rd					Final Four	Letran Lady Knights	W		
2010	10	3rd					Final Four	Letran Lady Knights	W		
2011	Suspended										
2012	10	1st					Finals	Letran Lady Knights	W		
2013	10	2nd					Finals	San Sebastian Lady Stags	W		
2014	10	1st					Finals	Arellano Lady Chiefs	W		
2015	10	3rd					Final Four	Benilde Lady Blazers	L		
2016	10	3rd	9	7	2	1.065	Final Four	Arellano Lady Chiefs	L		
2017	10	5th	9	5	4	1.051	Did not qualify				
2018	10	3rd	9	7	2	1.050	Final Four	San Beda Red Lionesses	L 0–3		
2019	10	2nd	9	7	2	1.199	Finals	Arellano Lady Chiefs	L 1–2		
2020	Tournament cancelled										
2021	Tournament cancelled										
2022	10	7th	9	2	6	0.611	Did not qualify				
2023	10	2nd	9	8	1	1.100	Stepladder Semifinals	Lyceum Lady Pirates	L 1–3		
2024	10	6th	9	5	4	1.022	Did not qualify				
2025	10	5th	18	9	9	1.002	Did not qualify				

== Notable players ==
- (Philippines) Angelique Dionela (L)
- (Philippines) Mary Rhose Dapol (OH)
- (Philippines) Honey Royse Tubino (OH/OP)

Legend
S	Setter
L	Libero
MB	Middle Blocker
OH	Outside Hitter
OP	Opposite Hitter

== See also ==
- Perpetual Altas
