= Des Clemente-de Guzman =

Filipino volleyball player

Des Clemente–De Guzman

Personal information
- Nationality: Filipino
- Born: December 5, 1994 (age 31)
- Hometown: Davao, Philippines
- Height: 1.86 m (6 ft 1 in)
- Education: University of Perpetual Help System Dalta; De La Salle University

Volleyball information
- Position: Middle Blocker
- Current team: Farm Fresh Foxies

Ma. Lourdes Clemente–De Guzman (born December 5, 1994) is a Filipino volleyball player. She played for the De La Salle Lady Spikers in the UAAP women's volleyball tournaments. She is currently playing for the Farm Fresh Foxies in the Premier Volleyball League.

== Career ==
=== Collegiate ===
Clemente played for the Lady Altas of the University of Perpetual Help System Dalta in the National Collegiate Athletic Association (NCAA).

After 3 season playing for the Perpetual Altas, she transferred and played for the De La Salle Lady Spikers.

She ended her stint with La Salle in Season 81, where they bagged bronze medal.

=== Clubs ===
In 2018, she joined F2 Logistics Cargo Movers played for them for 5 years.

In 2023, she transferred to Petro Gazz Angels and played for them for 3 conferences.

In 2024, she was signed by the Capital1 Solar Spikers.

In 2025, she was signed by the Farm Fresh Foxies.

== Clubs ==
- (Philippines) F2 Logistics Cargo Movers (2018–2023)
- (Philippines) Petro Gazz Angels (2023–2024)
- (Philippines) Capital1 Solar Spikers (2024–2025)
- (Philippines) Farm Fresh Foxies (2025–present)

== Awards ==
=== Individual ===
Year	League	Season/Conference	Award	Ref
2017	NCAA	92	1st Best Middle Blocker	
2018	NCAA	93	1st Best Middle Blocker	
2024	PVL	Reinforced	2nd Best Middle Blocker	

=== Collegiate ===
Year	League	Season	Title	Ref
2018	NCAA	93	3rd place	
2019	UAAP	81	3rd place	

=== Clubs ===
Year	League	Season/Conference	Club	Title	Ref
2018	PSL	Grand Prix	F2 Logistics Cargo Movers	Runner-up	
2018	PSL	Invitational	F2 Logistics Cargo Movers	Champions	
2018	PSL	All-Filipino	F2 Logistics Cargo Movers	Runner-up	
2019	PSL	Grand Prix	F2 Logistics Cargo Movers	Runner-up	
2019	PSL	All-Filipino	F2 Logistics Cargo Movers	Champions	
2019	PSL	Invitational	F2 Logistics Cargo Movers	Champions	
2023	PVL	1st All-Filipino	Petro Gazz Angels	Runner-up	
