= Howard Mojica =

Filipino volleyball player (born 1991)

Personal information
- Nationality: Filipino
- Born: December 13, 1991 (age 34)
- Height: 1.90 m (6 ft 3 in)
- Education: Emilio Aguinaldo College

Volleyball information
- Position: Outside Hitter
- Current club: Retired

Howard Mojica (born December 13, 1991) is a former volleyball player. He played for EAC Generals collegiate men's collegiate volleyball team. He also played for the Philippine Air Force Air Spikers in the Spikers' Turf.

== Career ==
=== Collegiate ===
Mojica made his first game appearance with the EAC Generals men's collegiate team in the NCAA Season 88, where they bagged the silver medal. They also bagged the silver medal in the NCAA Season 89.

In NCAA Season 90, they bagged the championship title.

In NCAA Season 91, Mojica made his final year playing for EAC Generals in the NCAA. They failed to defend their championship title.

== Clubs ==
- (Philippines) Cignal HD Spikers (2014)
- (Philippines) Philippine Air Force Air Spikers (2016)

== Awards ==
=== Individual ===
Year	League	Season/Conference	Award	Ref				
Year	League	Season/Conference	Award	Ref	2013	NCAA	88	Best Scorer
2014	89	Best Scorer				NCAA		
2015	90	MVP (Season)				NCAA		
2015	90	Best Scorer				NCAA		
2015	90	MVP (Finals)				NCAA		
2015	90	Best Attacker				NCAA		
2015	Spikers' Turf	Collegiate	1st Best Outside Spiker					
2016	NCAA	91	MVP (Season)					
2016	NCAA	91	Best Scorer					
2016	NCAA	91	Best Spiker					
2016	NCAA	91	Best Server					
2016	Spikers' Turf	Reinforced	MVP (Season)					
2016	Spikers' Turf	Reinforced	1st Best Outside Spiker					

=== Collegiate ===
Year	League	Season/Conference	Title	Ref				
Year	League	Season/Conference	Title	Ref	2015	Spikers' Turf	Open	3rd place

=== Clubs ===
Year	League	Season/Conference	Club	Title	Ref					
Year	League	Season/Conference	Club	Title	Ref	2016	Spikers' Turf	Open	Philippine Air Force Air Spikers	Champions
Reinforced	Champions					2016	Spikers' Turf		Philippine Air Force Air Spikers	
