= NCAA Season 88 =

- Host school: Colegio de San Juan de Letran
- Tagline: "Celebrate @ 88: Conquering New Glories for Your Honor"

General
- Seniors: San Beda Red Lions
- Juniors: San Sebastian Staglets

Seniors' champions
Sport		Men	Women
Basketball		San Beda	N/A
Volleyball		Perpetual	Perpetual
Chess		San Sebastian	
Taekwondo		Benilde	Benilde
Table Tennis		San Beda	Benilde
Lawn Tennis		Perpetual	
Swimming		San Beda	San Beda
Beach Volleyball		Perpetual	Perpetual
Track and field		JRU	N/A
Football		San Beda	N/A
Badminton		EAC	Benilde
- Cheerdance: Perpetual (Ex - Coed)

Juniors' champions
Sport		Boys	Girls
Basketball		San Beda	N/A
Volleyball		EAC–ICA	
Chess		Letran	
Taekwondo		San Sebastian	
Table Tennis		Letran	
Lawn Tennis		Letran	
Swimming		LSGH	
Beach Volleyball		EAC–ICA	
Track and field		EAC–ICA	
Football		San Beda	
Badminton		LSGH	
- (NT) = No tournament; (DS) = Demonstration Sport; (Ex) = Exhibition;

NCAA Season 88 is the 2012–13 season of the National Collegiate Athletic Association (NCAA) in the Philippines. The host school, Colegio de San Juan de Letran, will lead the opening ceremonies at the Smart Araneta Coliseum on June 23, 2012. TV5, via its Sports5 production, will air the men's basketball tournament at AKTV on IBC, its first year of airing the league. With its new TV contract, the league was allowed to schedule Saturday games; on its old TV coverage partner ABS-CBN, no weekend games were scheduled.

== Basketball ==
=== Seniors' tournament ===
==== Elimination round ====
Pos	Team	W	L	PCT	GB	Qualification
1	San Beda Red Lions	15	3	.833	—	Twice-to-beat in the semifinals
2	San Sebastian Stags	13	5	.722	2	Twice-to-beat in the semifinals
3	Letran Knights (H)	12	6	.667	3	Twice-to-win in the semifinals
4	Perpetual Altas	10	8	.556 (Note: Fourth-seed playoff: Perpetual 73–68 JRU)	5	Twice-to-win in the semifinals
5	JRU Heavy Bombers	10	8	.556	5	
6	Mapúa Cardinals	8	10	.444 (Note: Head-to-head record: Mapúa 2–0 EAC)	7	
7	EAC Generals (X)	8	10	.444	7	
8	Arellano Chiefs (X)	6	12	.333	9	
9	Benilde Blazers	5	13	.278	10	
10	LPU Pirates (X)	3	15	.167	12	

Source: ABS-CBN Sports
Rules for classification: 1) winning percentage; 2) if tied for top 4, one-game playoff; 3) head-to-head record; 4) overall point differential
(H) Hosts; (X) Under probation

==== Playoffs ====
Semifinals (Nos. 1 & 2 have twice-to-beat advantage)
1	San Beda	56
4	Perpetual	52
2	San Sebastian	74	70
3	Letran	92	73

Finals (Best-of-three series)
1	San Beda	62	55	67
3	Letran	60	64	39

=== Juniors' tournament ===
==== Elimination round ====
Pos	Team	W	L	PCT	GB	Qualification
1	San Beda Red Cubs	17	1	.944	—	Twice-to-beat in the semifinals
2	San Sebastian Staglets	16	2	.889	1	Twice-to-beat in the semifinals
3	La Salle Green Hills Greenies	13	5	.722 (Note: Third-seed playoff: LSGH 75–70 Letran)	4	Twice-to-win in the semifinals
4	Letran Squires (H)	13	5	.722	4	Twice-to-win in the semifinals
5	Mapúa Red Robins	11	7	.611	6	
6	Arellano Braves (X)	7	11	.389 (Note: Head-to-head record: Arellano 1–1 JRU (Arellano +18))	10	
7	JRU Light Bombers	7	11	.389	10	
8	Perpetual Junior Altas	4	14	.222	13	
9	EAC–ICA Brigadiers (X)	2	16	.111	15	
10	LPU Junior Pirates (X)	0	18	.000	17	

Source: ABS-CBN Sports
Rules for classification: 1) winning percentage; 2) if tied for top 4, one-game playoff; 3) head-to-head record; 4) overall point differential
(H) Hosts; (X) Under probation

==== Playoffs ====
Semifinals (Nos. 1 & 2 have twice-to-beat advantage)
1	San Beda	61
4	Letran	57
2	San Sebastian	58
3	LSGH	55

Finals (Best-of-three series)
1	San Beda	69	83
2	San Sebastian	51	58

== See also ==
- UAAP Season 75
