= Djanel Cheng =

Filipina volleyball player

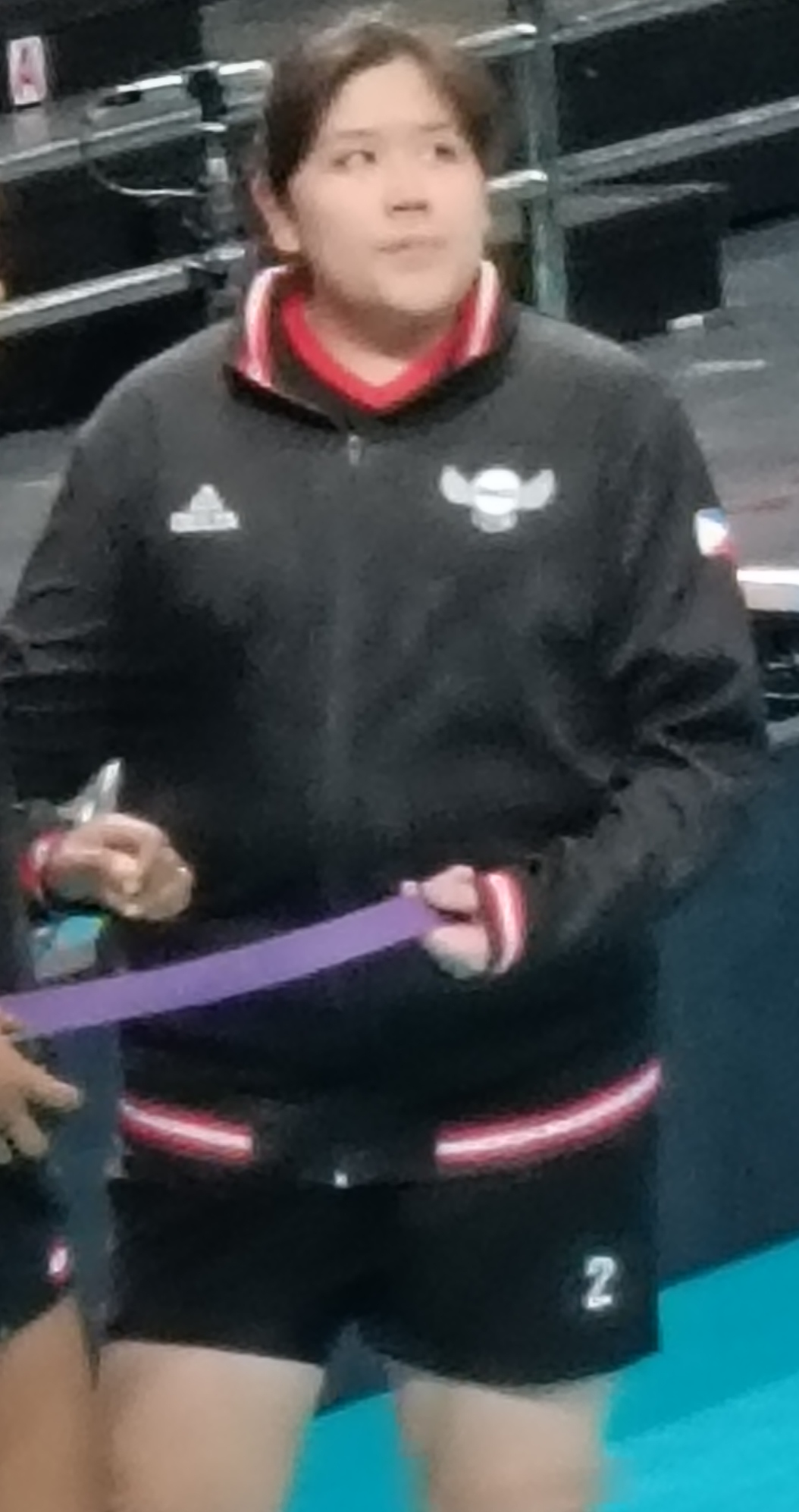
- Cheng in 2025

Personal information
- Full name: Djanel Welch Tanlo Cheng
- Born: September 28, 1994 (age 32); Manila, Philippines
- Height: 1.70 m (5 ft 7 in)
- Weight: 102 kg (225 lb)
- Education: De La Salle College of Saint Benilde

Volleyball information
- Position: Setter

Career
Years	Teams
2015–2016	Shopinas.com Lady Clickers
2016	Cignal HD Spikers
2016	F2 Logistics Cargo Movers
2017–2018	Sta. Lucia Lady Realtors
2018–2020	Petro Gazz Angels
2020–2022	Sta. Lucia Lady Realtors
2022–2025	Petro Gazz Angels
2026–present	Nxled Chameleons

Djanel Welch Tanlo Cheng (born September 28, 1994) is a Filipina professional volleyball player for the Nxled Chameleons of the Premier Volleyball League (PVL).

== Career ==
Djanel Cheng was a member of De La Salle College of Saint Benilde women's volleyball team. Her team claimed the first championship title in the NCAA in the NCAA Season 91 volleyball tournaments.

In 2022, Cheng returned to the Petro Gazz Angels after transferring from Sta. Lucia Lady Realtors in 2020.

== Personal life ==
She and her sister Desiree Cheng both play volleyball.

== Awards ==
Premier Volleyball League

- Medals:
  - Champions (2): 2019 Reinforced, 2022 Reinforced
  - Runner-up (3): 2019 Open, 2022 Open, 2023 First All-Filipino

Philippine Super Liga

- Medals:
  - Runner-up: 2015 All-Filipino
  - Third place: 2016 Grand Prix

PNVF Champions League

- Medals:
  - Champions: 2024

NCAA Philippines women's volleyball

- Best Setter (2): 2014 (Season 89), 2015 (Season 90)
- Medals:
  - Champions: 2016 (Season 91)
