= JRU Heavy Bombers, Lady Bombers and Light Bombers =

College sport teams in Manila

JRU Heavy Bombers and Lady Bombers
- School: José Rizal University
- League: NCAA
- Joined: 1927
- Location: Shaw Boulevard, Mandaluyong
- Team colors: Blue and Gold
- Juniors' team: Light Bombers

Seniors' general championships
- NCAA: none

Juniors' general championships
- NCAA: none

The JRU Heavy Bombers and Lady Bombers are the National Collegiate Athletic Association varsity teams of the Jose Rizal University.

The university's juniors team are the JRU Light Bombers.

The Heavy Bombers basketball team also plays in the PBA Developmental League.

== Name ==
The José Rizal University got its moniker from the abundance of World War II vintage bombs in their campus. The JRU campus, like many others, was turned into a garrison by the Japanese army. This led to many vintage bombs mined beneath the campus, which led to the heavy bombers moniker. The Seniors (collegiate) team adopted the Heavy Bomber, while the Juniors (high school) team adopted the Amazing Light Bombers.

== Scoring record ==
- Points - Keith Agovida 82 Points
- Assists - Cris Angelo Espinosa 21 Assists
- Rebounds - Joel Finuliar 14 Rebounds
- Steals - Cris Angelo Espinosa 16 Steals

On October 5, 2002, high school basketball player Cris Angelo Espinosa made an all-time record of 21 assists and 16 steals against San Beda Red Cubs making an All-Time Record in NCAA Junior's Division (a record almost beaten by a san Sebastian staglet in Season 92).

On September 5, 2008, high school basketball player Keith Agovida scored 82 points to break the scoring record held by Erwin Bolabola by the Letran Squires in a 127-49 trashing of Malayan Science.

== Volleyball ==
=== Women's volleyball roster ===
NCAA Season 93

JRU Lady Bombers
No.	Name	Position
1	RIVERA, Marcy Grace	Setter
2	HUIT, Victoria Kate	Libero
3	BAUTISTA, Aubry May	Middle Blocker
7	BONDOC, Angela Nicole	Opposite Spiker
8	MACARAYA, Annie	Libero
9	EBUENGA, Christine Kassandra	Middle Blocker
10	BATALON, Charry Bea	Open Spiker
11	ALVAREZ, Maria Shola May (c)	Open Spiker
12	JAVIER, Alecsandra Anne	Setter
14	VERSOZA, Dolly Grace	Open Spiker
15	MONTOJO, Karen Cay	Opposite Spiker
17	SIBANGAN, Annie Paula	Opposite Spiker
18	BODIONGAN, Angelie	Open Spiker

- Head coach: Mia Tioseco
- Assistant coach: Johnson Bariso

=== Men's volleyball roster ===
NCAA Season 93

JRU Heavy Bombers
No.	Name	Position
1	CRUZ, Angelo D.	
2	SALAZAR, Hernan T.	Middle Blocker
3	FRANCISCO, Raymark N.	
4	RABAJA, Patrick Pierre B. (c)	Middle Blocker
5	FERWELO, Jethro C.	
6	SORIANO, Dan Albert	
7	LAHAYLAHAY, Wenjo Froy G.	
8	SULIVAS, Patrick John L.	
9	MECALLER, John Cairo D.	
10	DEFENSOR, Melvyn B.	Libero
11	CEBEREO, Wilbert N.	Setter
12	DAMPITAN, Ronaldo Jr. D.	Outside Spiker
15	FLOR, John Michael V.	Libero

jake jhonson fernandez 95 middle blocker

- Head Coach: Ryan Joseph dela Paz
- Assistant coach: Peter Enanod

=== Beach volleyball ===
NCAA Season 93

Women's

- Maria Shola May Luna Alvarez
- Mercy Grace Rivera
- Dolly Grace Versoza

Men's

- John Michael V. Flor
- Wenjo Froy G. Lahaylahay

Juniors

- Cyril John Balasbas
- John Bert Macabebe
- Adriane Santos

=== Notable players ===
- Maria Shola May Luna Alvarez

- NCAA Season 91 Best Server
- NCAA Season 93 Most Valuable Player

- Karen Joy Montojo

- NCAA Season 92 Best Opposite Spiker

- Dolly Grace Verzosa

- NCAA Season 93 2nd Best Outside Spiker

== History ==
The last time JRU won a Championship was way back 1972 led by brothers Philip & David Cezar, Edgardo Carvajal, Olimpio Santos Jr., Cris Calilan, Rafael Lopez, William Canopio, Jimmy Santos, Carlo Magno Yabut, Melchor Rabadon, Jesus Avila, Renan Pablo, Jesus Ortiz, Minervino Reyes and Jesus Sta. Maria. Coach by Francisco "kiko" Calilan
