= Cesca Racraquin =

Filipino volleyball player (born 1996)

Personal information
- Full name: Aurea Francesca C. Racraquin
- Born: October 5, 1996 (age 30)
- Hometown: Quezon City, Philippines
- Height: 5 ft 7 in (1.70 m)
- Weight: 57 kg (126 lb)
- Education: De La Salle University; San Beda University

Volleyball information
- Position: Outside hitter
- Current club: Marinerang Pilipina
- Number: 18

Career
Years	Teams
2017	Creamline Cool Smashers
2018	Pocari Sweat Lady Warriors
2019	Marinerang Pilipina Lady Skippers

Aurea Francesca "Cesca" Racraquin (born October 5, 1996) is a Filipino volleyball player. In college, she played for the De La Salle Lady Spikers and san Beda Red Spikers. At the club level, she last played for the Marinerang Pilipina Lady Skippers of the Philippine Super Liga.

== Career ==
Racraquin won the NCAA Season 92 Rookie of the Year award before joining the Creamline Cool Smashers club that won the 2017 reinforced and open conferences' bronze medals. In the second season (2018) of the Premier Volleyball League, Racraquin transferred to Pocari Sweat Lady Warriors.

== Personal life ==
Racraquin finished high school at the University of the East Caloocan and is currently studying in San Beda University. She also studied in De La Salle University and was a member of the Lady Archers volleyball team.

== Filmography ==
=== Television ===
Year	Title	Network	Role	Notes
2022	NCAA Season 97 volleyball tournaments	GTV	Analyst	

== Awards ==
=== Individuals ===
- 2016 NCAA Season 92 "Rookie of the Year"

=== Clubs ===
- 2017 Premier Volleyball League 1st Season Reinforced Open Conference – Bronze medal, with Creamline Cool Smashers
- 2017 Premier Volleyball League 1st Season Open Conference - Bronze medal, with Creamline Cool Smashers
