= EAC Generals, Lady Generals and Brigadiers =

Varsity teams of Emilio Aguinaldo College

EAC Generals and Lady Generals
- School: Emilio Aguinaldo College
- League: NCAA
- Joined: UCAA: 2002-2008; NCRAA; NCAA: 2009-present
- Location: Ermita, Manila
- Team colors: White and Red
- Women's team: Lady Generals
- Juniors' team: EAC-ICA Brigadiers

Seniors' general championships
- NCAA: 0

Juniors' general championships
- NCAA: 0

The Emilio Aguinaldo College (EAC) Generals and Lady Generals are the varsity teams of Emilio Aguinaldo College of Paco, Manila. The Immaculate Conception Academy (ICA) is paired as the junior (high school) varsity team of the Emilio Aguinaldo College (EAC). The EAC-ICA Brigadiers is the junior team of EAC Generals.

The college's teams formerly played at the Universities and Colleges Athletic Association (UCAA) and the National Capital Region Athletic Association (NCRAA). They now play in the National Collegiate Athletic Association (Philippines).

The Generals nickname honors President General Emilio Aguinaldo, the first President of the Philippines and the college's namesake.

== History ==
=== UCAA ===
The Generals are one of the charter members of the UCAA in 2002; they first won the men's basketball title in 2004 where they defeated two-time runner-up Philippine School of Business Administration Jaguars. They would later win the next two UCAA championships mostly due to exploits of Ronjay Buenafe.

In 2007, the Generals failed to make it to the championship round of the UCAA men's basketball championships, a trend that continued until the 2008 season.

=== NCRAA ===
While the UCAA holds its basketball tournaments during the first semester (June–October) of the academic year, the NCRAA holds its basketball tournaments during the second semester (November–March) allowing the Generals (and several UCAA teams) to compete in the NCRAA. The Generals also clinched the 2005 title, while they were eliminated in the playoffs during the 2006 season. In the 2007 season, the Generals met the Arellano Chiefs in the best-of-three finals series. After tying the series 1–1, the Chiefs, through their defense that limited Buenafe to six points, defeated the Generals to win their first NCRAA title.

=== NCAA ===
With the departure of Philippine Christian University (PCU) Dolphins after exposure of several juniors' players enrolling with forged documents, the NCAA originally opened its doors for new members, and EAC was one of the schools that lodged their application. EAC was named as one of the frontrunners, but the NCAA Policy Board failed to garner enough number of votes to admit a new member which closed the doors for new members for their 2009–10 season.

However, the NCAA invited "guest teams" instead, and EAC along with the AUF Great Danes and fellow NCRAA member Arellano, were accepted as guest teams for the 2009–10 season, where they are also eligible to win championships.

EAC, along with two other teams, finished sixth in the 2009 season with a 6–12 record, two games behind fifth place Arellano, the best performer among the guest teams.

In 2015, EAC, along with Lyceum is accredited as full members of the NCAA, based from their performance in Season 90.

== Sports ==
=== Boys' Volleyball Roster Season 101 ===
Mark Allison Sican (C)

Jan Vincent Esmas

Jhoris Martin

Larhenz Clavo

Milbert Gravamen

Hanz Charlotte Ordoña

Angelo Fabianes

Justine Castro

Gian Ugalino

Jayrone Bueno

==== Notable players ====
===== Seniors =====
- NCAA Season 93 beach volleyball champions: Paolo Lim, Joshua Mina, Denzel Rasing
- Joshua Mina: NCAA Season 92 Rookie of the Year, NCAA Season 93 beach volleyball MVP
- Howard Mojica: NCAA Season 88 Best Scorer; NCAA Season 89 Best Scorer; NCAA Season 90 Season Most Valuable Player, Finals Most Valuable Player, Best Spiker, Best Scorer (Champion); NCAA Season 91 Season Most Valuable Player, Best Server, Best Spiker and Best Scorer; 2015 Spikers' Turf 1st Best Outside Spiker; 2016 Spikers' Turf Conference Most Valuable Player and 1st Best Outside Spiker

===== Juniors =====
- Ralph Joshua Pitogo: NCAA Season 91 Season Most Valuable Player, Rookie of the Year, and Best Blocker.
- Michael Vince Imperial: NCAA Season 91 Best Server
- Ceejay Hicap: NCAA Season 91 Best Receiver
- Ederson Rebusora: NCAA Season 92 1st Best Outside Spiker
- Francis Casas: NCAA Season 92 2nd Best Outside Spiker
- EAC–ICA Brigadiers: NCAA Season 92 beach volleyball champions
