= NCAA Season 93 volleyball tournaments =

NCAA Season 93
- Host school: San Sebastian College – Recoletos
Men's Finals	G1	G2	G3	Wins
Perpetual Altas	2	3	3	2
Arellano Chiefs	3	1	1	1
- Duration: Feb. 16–22, 2018
- Arena(s): Filoil Flying V Arena
- Finals MVP: Rey Taneo Jr.
- Winning coach: Sinfronio "Sammy" Acaylar
- Semifinalists: Benilde Blazers; San Beda Red Lions
- TV network(s): ABS-CBN Sports and Action, ABS-CBN Sports and Action HD
Women's Finals	G1	G2	Wins
Arellano Lady Chiefs	3	3	2
San Beda Red Lionesses	2	0	0
- Duration: Feb. 16–19, 2018
- Arena(s): Filoil Flying V Arena
- Finals MVP: Regine Anne Arocha
- Winning coach: Roberto "Obet" Javier
- Semifinalists: Perpetual Lady Altas; JRU Lady Bombers
- TV network(s): ABS-CBN Sports and Action, ABS-CBN Sports and Action HD
Juniors' Finals	G1	G2	Wins
Perpetual Junior Altas	3	3	2
Letran Squires	1	0	0
- Duration: Feb. 19–22, 2018
- Arena(s): Filoil Flying V Arena
- Finals MVP: Jody Margaux Severo
- Winning coach: Sandy Rieta
- Semifinalists: Arellano Braves; EAC–ICA Brigadiers

The volleyball tournament of NCAA Season 93 started on January 4, 2018 at the Filoil Flying V Arena in San Juan, Philippines. San Sebastian College – Recoletos (SSC–R) is the event host.

All teams will participate in an elimination round which is a single round robin tournament. The top four teams qualify in the semifinals, where the unbeaten team bounces through the finals, with a thrice-to-beat advantage, higher-seeded team possesses the twice-to-beat advantage, or qualify to the first round. The winners qualify to the finals.

== Men's tournament ==
=== Elimination round ===
==== Team standings ====
Pos	Team	Pld	W	L	Pts	SW	SL	SR	SPW	SPL	SPR	Qualification
1	Perpetual Altas	9	9	0	26	27	3	9.000	741	578	1.282	Finals
2	Arellano Chiefs	9	8	1	22	24	9	2.667	767	624	1.229	Semifinals with a twice-to-beat advantage
3	San Beda Red Lions	9	7	2	21	21	10	2.100	736	639	1.152	First-round playoff
4	Benilde Blazers	9	6	3	19	23	11	2.091	751	684	1.098	First-round playoff
5	Mapúa Cardinals	9	5	4	15	17	14	1.214	745	719	1.036	
6	EAC Generals	9	4	5	12	16	20	0.800	728	804	0.905	
7	JRU Heavy Bombers	9	2	7	8	12	22	0.545	700	784	0.893	
8	San Sebastian Stags (H)	9	2	7	6	9	24	0.375	681	772	0.882	
9	Lyceum Pirates	9	2	7	5	10	24	0.417	718	818	0.878	
10	Letran Knights	9	0	9	1	5	27	0.185	635	780	0.814	

Rules for classification: 3 points = win match in 3 or 4 sets; 2 points = win match in 5 sets; 1 point = lose match in 5 sets; 0 point = lose match in 3 or 4 sets
(H) Season host

==== Match-up results ====
Team ╲ Game	1	2	3	4	5	6	7	8	9
Arellano	Mapua school colors	EAC school colors	Letran school colors	JRU school colors	Lyceum school colors	UPHD school colors	San Beda school colors	CSB school colors	SSC-R school colors
Letran	CSB school colors	Mapua school colors	Arellano school colors	Lyceum school colors	San Beda school colors	SSC-R school colors	EAC school colors	JRU school colors	UPHD school colors
Benilde	Letran school colors	Lyceum school colors	San Beda school colors	SSC-R school colors	EAC school colors	JRU school colors	Arellano school colors	Mapua school colors	UPHD school colors
EAC	SSC-R school colors	Arellano school colors	JRU school colors	UPHD school colors	CSB school colors	Mapua school colors	Letran school colors	Lyceum school colors	San Beda school colors
JRU	San Beda school colors	SSC-R school colors	EAC school colors	Arellano school colors	UPHD school colors	CSB school colors	Mapua school colors	Letran school colors	Lyceum school colors
Lyceum	UPHD school colors	CSB school colors	Mapua school colors	Letran school colors	Arellano school colors	San Beda school colors	SSC-R school colors	EAC school colors	JRU school colors
Mapúa	Arellano school colors	Letran school colors	Lyceum school colors	San Beda school colors	SSC-R school colors	EAC school colors	JRU school colors	UPHD school colors	CSB school colors
San Beda	JRU school colors	UPHD school colors	CSB school colors	Mapua school colors	Letran school colors	Lyceum school colors	Arellano school colors	SSC-R school colors	EAC school colors
San Sebastian	EAC school colors	JRU school colors	UPHD school colors	CSB school colors	Mapua school colors	Letran school colors	Lyceum school colors	San Beda school colors	Arellano school colors
Perpetual	Lyceum school colors	San Beda school colors	SSC-R school colors	EAC school colors	JRU school colors	Arellano school colors	Mapua school colors	Letran school colors	CSB school colors

= Win; = Loss

==== Game results ====
Team	AU	CSJL	CSB	EAC	JRU	LPU	MU	SBU	SSC-R	UPHSD
AU		3–0	3–2	3–2	3–1	3–1	3–0	3–0	3–0	0–3
CSJL			0–3	2–3	0–3	1–3	0–3	1–3	1–3	0–3
CSB				3–2	3–0	3–0	3–0	1–3	3–0	2–3
EAC					3–2	3–1	0–3	0–3	3–0	0–3
JRU						3–1	1–3	0–3	2–3	0–3
LPU							1–3	3–0	3–2	0–3
MU								1–3	3–0	1–3
SBU									3–1	0–3
SSC-R										0–3

Legend: Blue = left column team win; Red = top row team win.

=== Final round ===
First round (One-game playoff)
3	San Beda	2
4	Benilde	3

Semifinals (No. 2 seed has twice-to-beat advantage)
2	Arellano	3
4	Benilde	0

Finals (Best-of-three series)
1	Perpetual	2	3	3
2	Arellano	3	1	1

==== First round ====
February 9, 2018; 11:00 (UTC +8:00)	San Beda Red Lions	2–3	Benilde Blazers	Filoil Flying V Arena, San Juan
February 9, 2018; 11:00 (UTC +8:00)	(16–25, 26–24, 19–25, 25–20, 18–20); P-2			Filoil Flying V Arena, San Juan

==== Semifinals ====
February 13, 2018; 14:00 (UTC +8:00)	Arellano Chiefs	3–0	Benilde Blazers	Filoil Flying V Arena, San Juan
February 13, 2018; 14:00 (UTC +8:00)	(25–22, 28–26, 25–23)			Filoil Flying V Arena, San Juan

==== Finals ====
February 16, 2018; 14:00 (UTC +8:00)	Perpetual Altas	2–3	Arellano Chiefs	Filoil Flying V Arena, San Juan
February 16, 2018; 14:00 (UTC +8:00)	(25–12, 21–25, 25–19, 24–26, 9–15); P-2			Filoil Flying V Arena, San Juan

February 19, 2018; 14:00 (UTC +8:00)	Arellano Chiefs	1–3	Perpetual Altas	Filoil Flying V Arena, San Juan
February 19, 2018; 14:00 (UTC +8:00)	(24–25, 20–25, 25–23, 16–25); P-2			Filoil Flying V Arena, San Juan

February 22, 2018; 16:00 (UTC +8:00)	Perpetual Altas	3–1	Arellano Chiefs	Filoil Flying V Arena, San Juan
February 22, 2018; 16:00 (UTC +8:00)	(25–23, 25–27, 25–19, 25–23); P-2			Filoil Flying V Arena, San Juan

- Finals' Most Valuable Player: Rey Taneo Jr.
- Coach of the year: Sinfronio "Sammy" Acaylar

=== Awards ===
- Season Most Valuable Player: Joebert Almodiel ( University of Perpetual Help System DALTA)
- Rookie of the Year: Joebert Almodiel ( University of Perpetual Help System DALTA)
- 1st Best Outside Spiker: Joebert Almodiel ( University of Perpetual Help System DALTA)
- 2nd Best Outside Spiker: Christian Dela Paz ( Arellano University)
- 1st Best Middle Blocker: Kevin Liberato ( Arellano University)
- 2nd Best Middle Blocker: Limuel Patenio ( San Beda University)
- Best Opposite Spiker: Mark Christian Encisco ( San Beda University)
- Best Setter: Warren Lewis Catipay ( University of Perpetual Help System DALTA)
- Best Libero: Jack Kalingking ( University of Perpetual Help System DALTA)

== Women's tournament ==
=== Elimination round ===
==== Team standings ====
Pos	Team	Pld	W	L	Pts	SW	SL	SR	SPW	SPL	SPR	Qualification
1	Arellano Lady Chiefs	9	8	1	23	25	7	3.571	761	572	1.330	Semifinals with a twice-to-beat advantage
2	San Beda Red Lionesses	9	8	1	21	24	13	1.846	830	750	1.107	Semifinals with a twice-to-beat advantage
3	Perpetual Lady Altas	9	7	2	20	23	13	1.769	803	765	1.050	Semifinals
4	JRU Lady Bombers	9	6	3	18	22	14	1.571	796	754	1.056	Semifinals
5	San Sebastian Lady Stags (H)	9	5	4	17	21	14	1.500	818	702	1.165	
6	Benilde Lady Blazers	9	5	4	13	18	17	1.059	807	729	1.107	
7	Letran Lady Knights	9	3	6	9	13	21	0.619	691	787	0.878	
8	EAC Lady Generals	9	2	7	7	13	25	0.520	727	847	0.858	
9	Lyceum Lady Pirates	9	1	8	6	11	25	0.440	674	830	0.812	
10	Mapúa Lady Cardinals	9	0	9	1	6	27	0.222	634	805	0.788	

Rules for classification: 3 points = win match in 3 or 4 sets; 2 points = win match in 5 sets; 1 point = lose match in 5 sets; 0 point = lose match in 3 or 4 sets
(H) Season host

==== Match-up results ====
Team ╲ Game	1	2	3	4	5	6	7	8	9
Arellano	Mapua school colors	EAC school colors	Letran school colors	JRU school colors	Lyceum school colors	UPHD school colors	San Beda school colors	CSB school colors	SSC-R school colors
Letran	CSB school colors	Mapua school colors	Arellano school colors	Lyceum school colors	San Beda school colors	SSC-R school colors	EAC school colors	JRU school colors	UPHD school colors
Benilde	Letran school colors	Lyceum school colors	San Beda school colors	SSC-R school colors	EAC school colors	JRU school colors	Arellano school colors	Mapua school colors	UPHD school colors
EAC	SSC-R school colors	Arellano school colors	JRU school colors	UPHD school colors	CSB school colors	Mapua school colors	Letran school colors	Lyceum school colors	San Beda school colors
JRU	San Beda school colors	SSC-R school colors	EAC school colors	Arellano school colors	UPHD school colors	CSB school colors	Mapua school colors	Letran school colors	Lyceum school colors
Lyceum	UPHD school colors	CSB school colors	Mapua school colors	Letran school colors	Arellano school colors	San Beda school colors	SSC-R school colors	EAC school colors	JRU school colors
Mapúa	Arellano school colors	Letran school colors	Lyceum school colors	San Beda school colors	SSC-R school colors	EAC school colors	JRU school colors	UPHD school colors	CSB school colors
San Beda	JRU school colors	UPHD school colors	CSB school colors	Mapua school colors	Letran school colors	Lyceum school colors	Arellano school colors	SSC-R school colors	EAC school colors
San Sebastian	EAC school colors	JRU school colors	UPHD school colors	CSB school colors	Mapua school colors	Letran school colors	Lyceum school colors	San Beda school colors	Arellano school colors
Perpetual	Lyceum school colors	San Beda school colors	SSC-R school colors	EAC school colors	JRU school colors	Arellano school colors	Mapua school colors	Letran school colors	CSB school colors

= Win; = Loss

==== Game results ====
Team	AU	CSJL	CSB	EAC	JRU	LPU	MIT	SBU	SSC-R	UPHSD
AU		3–0	1–3	3–0	3–1	3–0	3–0	3–0	3–1	3–2
CSJL			0–3	3–2	1–3	3–1	3–0	2–3	0–3	1–3
CSB				3–2	0–3	3–2	3–0	1–3	1–3	1–3
EAC					0–3	3–2	3–2	1–3	0–3	2–3
JRU						3–1	3–1	2–3	3–2	1–3
LPU							3–1	2–3	0–3	0–3
MIT								1–3	1–3	0–3
SBU									3–1	3–0
SSC-R										2–3

Legend: Blue = left column team win; Red = top row team win.

=== Final round ===
Semifinals (Nos. 1 & 2 have twice-to-beat advantage)
1	Arellano	3
4	JRU	0
2	San Beda	3
3	Perpetual	0

Finals (Best-of-three series)
1	Arellano	3	3
2	San Beda	2	0

==== Semifinals ====
Arellano vs JRU Arellano with twice-to-beat advantage.

February 9, 2018; 16:00 (UTC +8:00)	Arellano Lady Chiefs	3–0	JRU Lady Bombers	Filoil Flying V Arena, San Juan
February 9, 2018; 16:00 (UTC +8:00)	(25–13, 25–20, 25–17); P-2			Filoil Flying V Arena, San Juan

San Beda vs UPHD San Beda with twice-to-beat advantage.

February 9, 2018; 14:00 (UTC +8:00)	San Beda Red Lionesses	3–0	Perpetual Lady Altas	Filoil Flying V Arena, San Juan
February 9, 2018; 14:00 (UTC +8:00)	(25–21, 25–15, 25–23); P-2			Filoil Flying V Arena, San Juan

==== Finals ====
February 16, 2018; 16:00 (UTC +8:00)	Arellano Lady Chiefs	3–2	San Beda Red Lionesses	Filoil Flying V Arena, San Juan
February 16, 2018; 16:00 (UTC +8:00)	(25–15, 25–16, 15–25, 22–25, 15–6); P-2			Filoil Flying V Arena, San Juan

February 19, 2018; 16:00 (UTC +8:00)	San Beda Red Lionesses	0–3	Arellano Lady Chiefs	Filoil Flying V Arena, San Juan
February 19, 2018; 16:00 (UTC +8:00)	(13–25, 27–29, 15–25); P-2			Filoil Flying V Arena, San Juan

- Finals' Most Valuable Player: Regine Anne Arocha
- Coach of the year: Roberto "Obet" Javier

=== Awards ===
- Season Most Valuable Player: Maria Shola May Alvarez ( Jose Rizal University)
- Rookie of the Year: Necole Ebuen ( Arellano University)
- 1st Best Outside Spiker: Jovielyn Grace Prado ( Arellano University)
- 2nd Best Outside Spiker: Dolly Grace Verzosa ( Jose Rizal University)
- 1st Best Middle Blocker: Ma. Lourdes Clemente ( University of Perpetual Help System DALTA)
- 2nd Best Middle Blocker: Joyce Sta. Rita ( San Sebastian College – Recoletos)
- Best Opposite Spiker: Regine Anne Arocha ( Arellano University)
- Best Setter: Vira Guillema ( San Sebastian College – Recoletos)
- Best Libero: Alyssa Eroa ( San Sebastian College – Recoletos)

== Juniors' tournament ==
=== Elimination round ===
==== Team standings ====
Pos	Team	Pld	W	L	Pts	SW	SL	SR	SPW	SPL	SPR	Qualification
1	EAC–ICA Brigadiers	7	6	1	17	20	9	2.222	676	617	1.096	Semifinals with a twice-to-beat advantage
2	La Salle Green Hills Greenies	5	4	1	11	13	7	1.857	464	438	1.059	Semifinals
3	Perpetual Junior Altas	4	3	1	9	9	3	3.000	291	230	1.265	Semifinals
4	Letran Squires	5	3	2	9	10	7	1.429	395	363	1.088	
5	Lyceum Junior Pirates	6	2	4	6	8	15	0.533	478	505	0.947	
6	Arellano Braves	3	1	2	4	6	6	1.000	264	253	1.043	
7	San Beda Red Cubs	5	1	4	3	5	13	0.385	348	441	0.789	
8	San Sebastian Staglets (H)	5	0	5	1	4	15	0.267	381	342	1.114	

Rules for classification: 3 points = win match in 3 or 4 sets; 2 points = win match in 5 sets; 1 point = lose match in 5 sets; 0 point = lose match in 3 or 4 sets
(H) Season host

==== Match-up results ====
Team ╲ Game	1	2	3	4	5	6	7
Arellano	EAC school colors	Letran school colors	Lyceum school colors	UPHD school colors	San Beda school colors	CSB school colors	SSC-R school colors
Letran	CSB school colors	Arellano school colors	Lyceum school colors	San Beda school colors	SSC-R school colors	EAC school colors	UPHD school colors
LSGH	Letran school colors	Lyceum school colors	San Beda school colors	SSC-R school colors	EAC school colors	Arellano school colors	UPHD school colors
EAC–ICA	SSC-R school colors	Arellano school colors	UPHD school colors	CSB school colors	Letran school colors	Lyceum school colors	San Beda school colors
Lyceum	UPHD school colors	CSB school colors	Letran school colors	Arellano school colors	San Beda school colors	SSC-R school colors	EAC school colors
San Beda	UPHD school colors	CSB school colors	Letran school colors	Lyceum school colors	Arellano school colors	SSC-R school colors	EAC school colors
San Sebastian	EAC school colors	UPHD school colors	CSB school colors	Letran school colors	Lyceum school colors	San Beda school colors	Arellano school colors
Perpetual	Lyceum school colors	San Beda school colors	SSC-R school colors	EAC school colors	Arellano school colors	Letran school colors	CSB school colors

= Win; = Loss

==== Game results ====
Team	AU	CSJL	LSGH	EAC-ICA	LPU	SBC-R	SSC-R	UPHSD
AU		1–3	–	2–3	3–0	–	–	–
CSJL			1–3	0–3	3–0	3–0	–	–
LSGH				1–3	3–2	3–1	3–0	–
EAC-ICA					2–3	3–1	3–2	3–0
LPU						–	3–1	0–3
SBC-R							3–1	0–3
SSC-R								0–3

Legend: Blue = left column team win; Red = top row team win.

=== Final round ===
Fourth-seed playoff
LSGH	2
Letran	3

Semifinals; Top seeds twice-to-beat
1	EAC–ICA	1
2	Letran	3	3
3	Perpetual	3
4	Arellano	1

Finals; Best-of-three series
4	Letran	1	0
2	Perpetual	3	3

==== Fourth-seed playoff ====
February 9, 2018; 08:00 (UTC +8:00)	La Salle Green Hills Greenies	2–3	Letran Squires	Filoil Flying V Arena, San Juan
February 9, 2018; 08:00 (UTC +8:00)	(25–13, 23–25, 23–25, 25–20, 12–15)			Filoil Flying V Arena, San Juan

==== Semifinals ====
EAC vs Letran EAC with twice-to-beat advantage.

February 13, 2018; 10:00 (UTC +8:00)	EAC–ICA Brigadiers	1–3	Letran Squires	Filoil Flying V Arena, San Juan
February 13, 2018; 10:00 (UTC +8:00)	(25–21, 20–25, 13–25, 13–25); P-2			Filoil Flying V Arena, San Juan

February 16, 2018; 10:00 (UTC +8:00)	Letran Squires	3–1	EAC–ICA Brigadiers	Filoil Flying V Arena, San Juan
February 16, 2018; 10:00 (UTC +8:00)	(25–23, 28–30, 25–23, 25–23); P-2			Filoil Flying V Arena, San Juan

Perpetual vs Arellano Perpetual with twice-to-beat advantage.

February 13, 2018; 12:00 (UTC +8:00)	Perpetual Junior Altas	3–1	Arellano Braves	Filoil Flying V Arena, San Juan
February 13, 2018; 12:00 (UTC +8:00)	(25–17, 20–25, 25–19, 25–17); P-2			Filoil Flying V Arena, San Juan

==== Finals ====
February 19, 2018; 11:00 (UTC +8:00)	Letran Squires	1–3	Perpetual Junior Altas	Filoil Flying V Arena, San Juan
February 19, 2018; 11:00 (UTC +8:00)	(16–25, 15–25, 25–20, 20–25); P-2			Filoil Flying V Arena, San Juan

February 22, 2018; 13:00 (UTC +8:00)	Perpetual Junior Altas	3–0	Letran Squires	Filoil Flying V Arena, San Juan
February 22, 2018; 13:00 (UTC +8:00)	(25–17, 25–17, 25–17)			Filoil Flying V Arena, San Juan

- Finals' Most Valuable Player: Jody Margaux Severo
- Coach of the year: Sandy Rieta

=== Awards ===
- Season Most Valuable Player: Kirk Patrick Rosos ( University of Perpetual Help System DALTA)
- Rookie of the Year: Arnel Christian Aguilar ( La Salle Green Hills)
- 1st Best Outside Spiker: Noel Michael Kampton ( University of Perpetual Help System DALTA)
- 2nd Best Outside Spiker: Juvie Colonia ( Lyceum of the Philippines University)
- 1st Best Middle Blocker: Raliuz Joezer Cantos ( La Salle Green Hills)
- 2nd Best Middle Blocker: Gideon James Guadalupe ( Arellano University)
- Best Opposite Spiker: John Paulo Lorenzo ( Colegio de San Juan de Letran)
- Best Setter: Michael Vince Imperial ( EAC–Immaculate Conception Academy)
- Best Libero: Raxel Redd Catris ( Colegio de San Juan de Letran)

Preceded by NCAA Season 92	NCAA Philippines seasons 2017–18	Succeeded by NCAA Season 94

== See also ==
- UAAP Season 80 volleyball tournaments
