= NCAA Season 92 volleyball tournaments =

NCAA Season 92
- Host school: De La Salle-College of Saint Benilde
Men's Finals	G1	G2	Wins
Perpetual Altas	0	2	0
Benilde Blazers	3	3	2
- Duration: February 3–7, 2017
- Arena(s): Filoil Flying V Arena
- Finals MVP: Isaiah Arda
- Winning coach: Arnold Laniog
- Semifinalists: Arellano Chiefs; San Beda Red Lions
- TV network(s): ABS-CBN Sports and Action, ABS-CBN Sports and Action HD
Women's Finals	G1	G2	G3	Wins
San Sebastian Lady Stags	0	2	1	0
Arellano Lady Chiefs	3	3	3	3
- Duration: February 7–14, 2017
- Arena(s): Filoil Flying V Arena
- Finals MVP: Jovielyn Prado
- Winning coach: Obet Javier
- Semifinalists: Benilde Lady Blazers; San Beda Red Lionesses
- TV network(s): ABS-CBN Sports and Action, ABS-CBN Sports and Action HD

The volleyball tournaments of NCAA Season 92 started on November 14, 2016. The College of Saint Benilde is currently hosting the tournament. Games are played at the Filoil Flying V Arena in San Juan, with two women's and men's games. The women's and men's semifinals' and finals' games are aired live by ABS-CBN Sports and Action and in High Definition on ABS-CBN Sports and Action HD 166.

== Men's tournament ==
=== Elimination round ===
Pos	Team	Pld	W	L	Pts	SW	SL	SR	SPW	SPL	SPR	Qualification
1	Perpetual Altas	9	8	1	24	26	5	5.200	741	636	1.165	Qualified to the semifinals with a twice-to-beat advantage
2	Benilde Blazers (H)	9	8	1	24	24	7	3.429	772	645	1.197	Qualified to the semifinals with a twice-to-beat advantage
3	San Beda Red Lions	9	7	2	19	23	13	1.769	828	747	1.108	Qualified to semifinals
4	Arellano Chiefs	9	6	3	19	21	12	1.750	771	706	1.092	Qualified to semifinals
5	Mapúa Cardinals	9	5	4	14	17	16	1.063	726	735	0.988	
6	Lyceum Pirates	9	4	5	13	20	19	1.053	832	818	1.017	
7	San Sebastian Stags	9	3	6	7	11	23	0.478	698	784	0.890	
8	Letran Knights	9	2	7	7	11	23	0.478	690	773	0.893	
9	EAC Generals	9	1	8	5	9	24	0.375	676	764	0.885	
10	JRU Heavy Bombers	9	1	8	3	6	26	0.231	626	751	0.834	

(H) Season host

Point system:

- 3 points = win match in 3 or 4 sets
- 2 points = win match in 5 sets
- 1 point = lose match in 5 sets
- 0 point = lose match in 3 or 4 sets

Team ╲ Game	1	2	3	4	5	6	7	8	9
AU	SSC–R	EAC	MIT	CSJL	SBC	JRU	CSB	LPU	UPHSD
CSJL	LPU	CSB	SSC–R	AU	UPHSD	SBC	MIT	JRU	EAC
CSB	UPHSD	CSJL	MIT	JRU	LPU	EAC	SBC	AU	SSC–R
EAC	SBC	AU	JRU	UPHSD	SSC–R	CSB	LPU	MIT	CSJL
JRU	MIT	LPU	EAC	CSB	SBC	SSC–R	AU	CSJL	UPHSD
LPU	CSJL	JRU	SBC	CSB	MIT	EAC	UPHSD	AU	SSC–R
MIT	JRU	SSC–R	CSB	AU	UPHSD	LPU	CSJL	EAC	SBC
SBC	EAC	UPHSD	LPU	SSC–R	JRU	AU	CSJL	CSB	MIT
SSC–R	AU	MIT	CSJL	SBC	EAC	JRU	UPHSD	LPU	CSB
10									

= Win; = Loss

==== Game results ====
Results to the right and top of the gray cells are first round games.

Team	AU	CSJL	CSB	EAC	JRU	LPU	MIT	SBC	SSC-R	UPHSD
AU		3–1	–	3–0	–	–	3–1	2–3	3–0	–
CSJL			0–3	–	–	3–2	–	2–3	2–3	0–3
CSB				3–1	3–0	3–1	3–0	–	–	0–3
EAC					2–3	–	–	0–3	2–3	0–3
JRU						–	0–3	0–3	1–3	–
LPU							2–3	3–2	–	–
MIT								–	3–1	–
SBC									3–0	3–2
SSC-R										–
UPHSD										

Legend: Blue = left column team win; Red = top row team win.

=== Playoffs ===
1st–seed playoff
Perpetual	0
Benilde	3

Semifinals; Top seeds twice-to-beat
Benilde	3
4	Arellano	0
Perpetual	3
San Beda	2

Finals; Best-of-three series
1	Benilde	3	3
2	Perpetual	0	2

==== Semifinals ====
January 31, 2017; 11:30	Perpetual Altas	3–2	San Beda Red Lions	Filoil Flying V Arena, San Juan
January 31, 2017; 11:30	(18–25, 18–25, 25–20, 25–17, 15–11); P-2			Filoil Flying V Arena, San Juan

January 31, 2017; 14:00	Benilde Blazers	3–0	Arellano Chiefs	Filoil Flying V Arena, San Juan
January 31, 2017; 14:00	(27–25, 25–20, 25–14); P-2			Filoil Flying V Arena, San Juan

==== Finals ====
- Best-of-three series

February 3, 2017; 14:00	Perpetual Altas	0–3	Benilde Blazers	Filoil Flying V Arena, San Juan
February 3, 2017; 14:00	(17–25, 24–26, 17–25); P-2			Filoil Flying V Arena, San Juan

February 7, 2017; 14:00	Benilde Blazers	3–2	Perpetual Altas	Filoil Flying V Arena, San Juan
February 7, 2017; 14:00	(25–12, 21–25, 17–25, 25–14, 18–16); P-2			Filoil Flying V Arena, San Juan

=== Awards ===
- Finals' MVP: Isaiah Arda ( CSB)
- Season Most Valuable Player: John Vic De Guzman ( CSB)
- Rookie of the Year: Joshua Mina ( EAC)
- 1st Best Outside Spiker: Adrian Viray ( SBC)
- 2nd Best Outside Spiker: John Joseph Cabillan ( AU)
- 1st Best Middle Blocker: Kevin Liberato ( AU)
- 2nd Best Middle Blocker: Limuel Patenio ( SBC)
- Best opposite spiker: John Vic De Guzman ( CSB)
- Best setter: Relan Taneo ( UPHSD)
- Best libero: Jack Kalingking( UPHSD)

== Women's tournament ==
=== Elimination round ===
Pos	Team	Pld	W	L	Pts	SW	SL	SR	SPW	SPL	SPR	Qualification
1	San Sebastian Lady Stags	9	9	0	25	27	5	5.400	777	569	1.366	Qualified to the finals with the thrice-to-beat advantage
2	Arellano Lady Chiefs	9	8	1	25	26	7	3.714	792	635	1.247	Qualified to the semifinals
3	Benilde Lady Blazers (H)	9	6	3	18	21	15	1.400	795	733	1.085	Qualified to the first-round playoff
4	San Beda Red Lionesses	9	6	3	17	19	12	1.583	695	628	1.107	Qualified to the first-round playoff
5	Perpetual Lady Altas	9	5	4	15	18	13	1.385	700	666	1.051	
6	Lyceum Lady Pirates	9	5	4	13	15	16	0.938	689	673	1.024	
7	JRU Lady Bombers	9	3	6	8	11	21	0.524	632	737	0.858	
8	Letran Lady Knights	9	2	7	8	14	24	0.583	774	861	0.899	
9	EAC Lady Generals	9	1	8	4	6	24	0.250	564	708	0.797	
10	Mapúa Lady Cardinals	9	0	9	2	7	27	0.259	593	801	0.740	

(H) Season host

Point system:

- 3 points = win match in 3 or 4 sets
- 2 points = win match in 5 sets
- 1 point = lose match in 5 sets
- 0 point = lose match in 3 or 4 sets

Team ╲ Game	1	2	3	4	5	6	7	8	9
AU	SSC–R	EAC	MIT	CSJL	SBC	JRU	CSB	LPU	UPHD
CSJL	LPU	CSB	SSC–R	AU	UPHD	SBC	MIT	JRU	EAC
CSB	UPHD	CSJL	MIT	JRU	LPU	EAC	SBC	AU	SSC–R
EAC	SBC	AU	JRU	UPHD	SSC–R	CSB	LPU	MIT	CSJL
JRU	MIT	LPU	EAC	CSB	SBC	SSC–R	AU	CSJL	UPHD
LPU	CSJL	JRU	SBC	CSB	MIT	EAC	UPHD	AU	SSC–R
MIT	JRU	SSC–R	CSB	AU	UPHD	LPU	CSJL	EAC	SBC
SBC	EAC	UPHD	LPU	SSC–R	JRU	AU	CSJL	CSB	MIT
SSC–R	AU	MIT	CSJL	SBC	EAC	JRU	UPHD	LPU	CSB
10									

= Win; = Loss

==== Game results ====
Results to the right and top of the gray cells are first round games.

Team	AU	CSJL	CSB	EAC	JRU	LPU	MIT	SBC	SSC-R	UPHSD
AU		3–1	3–0	3–0	3–1	3–0	3–1	3–0	2–3	3–1
CSJL			2–3	3–2	1–3	2–3	3–1	0–3	2–3	0–3
CSB				3–1	3–0	2–3	3–1	3–1	1–3	3–1
EAC					0–3	0–3	3–0	0–3	0–3	0–3
JRU						0–3	3–2	0–3	0–3	1–3
LPU							3–0	0–3	0–3	0–3
MIT								2–3	0–3	0–3
SBC									0–3	3–1
SSC-R										3–0
UPHSD										

Legend: Blue = left column team win; Red = top row team win.

=== Playoffs ===
Stepladder round 1 (One-game playoff)
3	Benilde	3
4	San Beda	0

Semifinals (One-game playoff)
2	Arellano	3
3	Benilde	2

Finals (No. 1 seed has to win twice; opponent thrice)
1	San Sebastian	0	2	1
2	Arellano	3	3	3

==== First round ====
January 31, 2017; 16:00	San Beda Red Lionesses	0–3	Benilde Lady Blazers	Filoil Flying V Arena, San Juan
January 31, 2017; 16:00	(22–25, 20–25, 15–25)			Filoil Flying V Arena, San Juan

==== Semifinals ====
February 3, 2017; 16:00	Arellano Lady Chiefs	3–2	Benilde Lady Blazers	Filoil Flying V Arena, San Juan
February 3, 2017; 16:00	(19–25, 25–23, 19–25, 25–13, 15–9)			Filoil Flying V Arena, San Juan

==== Finals ====
February 7, 2017; 16:00	San Sebastian Lady Stags	0–3	Arellano Lady Chiefs	Filoil Flying V Arena, San Juan
February 7, 2017; 16:00	(18–25, 20–25, 16–25)			Filoil Flying V Arena, San Juan

February 10, 2017; 16:00	Arellano Lady Chiefs	3–2	San Sebastian Lady Stags	Filoil Flying V Arena, San Juan
February 10, 2017; 16:00	(18–25, 25–16, 25–10, 26–28, 15–13)			Filoil Flying V Arena, San Juan

February 13, 2017; 15:30	San Sebastian Lady Stags	1–3	Arellano Lady Chiefs	Filoil Flying V Arena, San Juan
February 13, 2017; 15:30	(15–25, 25–22, 23–25, 16–25)			Filoil Flying V Arena, San Juan

- Finals' Most Valuable Player: Jovielyn Prado
- Coach of the Year: Obet Javier

=== Awards ===
- Season Most Valuable Player: Grethcel Soltones ( SSC–R)
- Rookie of the Year: Francesca Racraquin ( SBC)
- 1st Best Outside Spiker: Grethcel Soltones ( SSC–R)
- 2nd Best Outside Spiker: Jovelyn Prado ( AU)
- 1st Best Middle Blocker: Ma. Lourdes Clemente ( UPHD)
- 2nd Best Middle Blocker: Coleen Bravo ( UPHD)
- Best opposite spiker: Karen Joy Montojo ( JRU)
- Best setter: Vira Guillema ( SSC–R)
- Best libero: Alyssa Eroa ( SSC–R)

== Juniors' Tournament ==
=== Elimination round ===
Pos	Team	Pld	W	L	Pts	SW	SL	SR	SPW	SPL	SPR
1	San Beda Red Cubs	0	0	0	0	0	0	—	0	0	—
2	Perpetual Junior Altas	0	0	0	0	0	0	—	0	0	—
3	Arellano Braves	0	0	0	0	0	0	—	0	0	—
4	La Salle Green Hills Greenies (H)	0	0	0	0	0	0	—	0	0	—
5	Letran Squires	0	0	0	0	0	0	—	0	0	—
6	Lyceum Junior Pirates	0	0	0	0	0	0	—	0	0	—
7	EAC–ICA Brigadiers	0	0	0	0	0	0	—	0	0	—
8	San Sebastian Staglets	0	0	0	0	0	0	—	0	0	—

(H) Season host

Point system:

- 3 points = win match in 3 or 4 sets
- 2 points = win match in 5 sets
- 1 point = lose match in 5 sets
- 0 point = lose match in 3 or 4 sets

Team ╲ Game	1	2	3	4	5	6	7
AU	SSC–R	EAC–ICA	CSJL	SBC–R	LSGH	LPU	Perpetual Junior Altas
CSJL	LPU	LSGH	SSC–R	AU	Perpetual Junior Altas	SBC–R	EAC–ICA
LSGH	Perpetual Junior Altas	CSJL	LPU	EAC–ICA	SBC–R	AU	SSC–R
EAC–ICA	SBC–R	AU	Perpetual Junior Altas	SSC–R	LSGH	LPU	CSJL
LPU	CSJL	SBC–R	LSGH	EAC–ICA	Perpetual Junior Altas	AU	SSC–R
SBC–R	EAC–ICA	Perpetual Junior Altas	LPU	SSC–R	AU	CSJL	LSGH
SSC–R	AU	CSJL	SBC–R	EAC–ICA	Perpetual Junior Altas	LPU	LSGH
UPHSD	LSGH	SBC–R	EAC–ICA	CSJL	SSC–R	LPU	AU

= Win; = Loss

==== Game results ====
Results to the right and top of the gray cells are first round games.

Team	AU	CSJL	LSGH	EAC-ICA	LPU	SBC-R	SSC-R	UPHSD
AU		3–0	–	2–3	–	–	3–0	–
CSJL			3–0	–	1–3	–	3–1	–
LSGH				–	0–3	–	–	0–3
EAC-ICA					–	3–1	–	3–2
LPU						3–0	–	–
SBC-R							3–1	–
SSC-R								–
UPHSD								

Legend: Blue = left column team win; Red = top row team win.

=== Playoffs ===
- Finals' Most Valuable Player: TBD
- Coach of the Year: TBD

=== Awards ===
- Season Most Valuable Player: Genesis Allan Redido ( LPU)
- Rookie of the Year: Juciv Colina ( LPU)
- 1st Best Outside Spiker: Ederson Rebusora ( EAC–ICA)
- 2nd Best Outside Spiker: Francis Casas ( EAC–ICA)
- 1st Best Middle Blocker: Valeriano Sasis III ( LPU)
- 2nd Best Middle Spiker: Allen Angelo Calicdan ( LPU)
- Best opposite spiker: Robbie Pamittan ( AU)
- Best setter: Sean Michael Escallar ( LPU)
- Best libero: Zackhaery Dablo ( AU)

== Beach volleyball ==
The NCAA Season 92 beach volleyball tournament will be held in February 2017.

Division	Team	Players	Opponent/Score
Women's Division	San Sebastian Lady Stags (4-peat)	Grethcel Soltones and Alyssa Eroa	def. San Beda Red Lionesses 16–21, 21–15, 15–11
Men's Division	Perpetual Altas	Relan Taneo and Rey Taneo Jr.	def. Lyceum Pirates 15–21, 21–16, 15–13
Juniors Division	EAC–ICA Brigadiers		def. Letran Squires 24–22, 21–15

== See also ==
- UAAP Season 79 volleyball tournaments
- NCAA Season 92

Preceded by Season 91 (2015)	NCAA volleyball seasons Season 92 (2016)	Succeeded by Season 93 (2017)
