= NCAA Season 91 volleyball tournaments =

NCAA Season 91
- Colegio de San Juan de Letran
Men's Finals	G1	G2	G3	Wins
EAC Generals	3	1	2	1
Perpetual Altas	1	3	3	2
- Duration: Nov. 30, 2015 – Jan. 26, 2016
- Arena(s): Filoil Flying V Arena
- Finals MVP: Rey Taneo, Jr.
- Winning coach: Sinfronio Acaylar
- Semifinalists: Benilde Blazers (bronze); San Beda Red Lions
- TV network(s): ABS-CBN Sports and Action, ABS-CBN Sports and Action HD
Women's Finals	G1	G2	G3	G4	Wins
San Sebastian Lady Stags	1	1	3	1	1+1
Benilde Lady Blazers	3	3	1	3	3
- Duration: Nov. 30, 2015 – Jan. 28, 2016
- Arena(s): Filoil Flying V Arena
- Finals MVP: Jeanette Panaga
- Winning coach: Michael Cariño
- Semifinalists: Arellano Lady Chiefs (bronze); Perpetual Lady Altas
- TV network(s): ABS-CBN Sports and Action, ABS-CBN Sports and Action HD

The volleyball tournaments of NCAA Season 91 started on November 30, 2015. The Colegio de San Juan de Letran is currently hosting the tournament. Games are played at the Filoil Flying V Arena in San Juan, with two women's and men's games. The women's and men's semifinals' and finals' games are aired live by ABS-CBN Sports and Action and in High Definition on ABS-CBN Sports and Action HD 166.

== Women's tournament ==
=== Elimination round ===
Pos	Team	Pld	W	L	Pts	SW	SL	SR	SPW	SPL	SPR	Qualification
1	San Sebastian Lady Stags	9	9	0	26	27	6	4.500	793	601	1.319	Qualified to the finals with the thrice-to-beat advantage
2	Arellano Lady Chiefs	9	8	1	23	25	6	4.167	757	580	1.305	Qualified to the semifinals
3	Perpetual Lady Altas	9	7	2	19	22	11	2.000	734	689	1.065	Qualified to the first-round playoff
4	Benilde Lady Blazers	9	6	3	19	23	13	1.769	823	697	1.181	Qualified to the first-round playoff
5	Lyceum Lady Pirates	9	4	5	13	17	20	0.850	743	806	0.922	
6	JRU Lady Bombers	9	4	5	12	15	16	0.938	654	687	0.952	
7	San Beda Red Lionesses	9	3	6	10	13	21	0.619	689	754	0.914	
8	EAC Lady Generals	9	3	6	8	14	24	0.583	741	801	0.925	
9	Mapúa Lady Cardinals	9	1	8	3	7	26	0.269	655	784	0.835	
10	Letran Lady Knights (H)	9	0	9	2	6	27	0.222	619	744	0.832	

(H) Season host

Point system:

- 3 points = win match in 3 or 4 sets
- 2 points = win match in 5 sets
- 1 point = lose match in 5 sets
- 0 point = lose match in 3 or 4 sets

=== Playoffs ===
Stepladder round 1 (One-game playoff)
3	Perpetual	1
4	Benilde	3

Semifinals (One-game playoff)
2	Arellano	0
4	Benilde	3

Finals (No. 1 seed has to win twice; opponent thrice)
1	San Sebastian	1	1	3	1
4	Benilde	3	3	1	3

==== First round ====
January 12; 04:00 PM (UTC+08:00)	Perpetual Lady Altas	1–3	Benilde Lady Blazers	Filoil Flying V Arena, San Juan
January 12; 04:00 PM (UTC+08:00)	25–16, 19–25, 11–25, 21–25			Filoil Flying V Arena, San Juan

==== Second round ====
January 15; 04:00 PM (UTC+08:00)	Arellano Lady Chiefs	0–3	Benilde Lady Blazers	Filoil Flying V Arena, San Juan
January 15; 04:00 PM (UTC+08:00)	(20–25, 22–25, 23–25)			Filoil Flying V Arena, San Juan

==== Finals ====
January 19; 04:00 PM (UTC+08:00)	San Sebastian Lady Stags	1–3	Benilde Lady Blazers	Filoil Flying V Arena, San Juan
January 19; 04:00 PM (UTC+08:00)	(26–24, 21–25, 19–25, 13–25)			Filoil Flying V Arena, San Juan

January 22; 04:00 PM (UTC+08:00)	San Sebastian Lady Stags	1–3	Benilde Lady Blazers	Filoil Flying V Arena, San Juan
January 22; 04:00 PM (UTC+08:00)	(23–25, 25–21, 22–25, 16–25)			Filoil Flying V Arena, San Juan

January 25; 04:00 PM (UTC+08:00)	San Sebastian Lady Stags	3–1	Benilde Lady Blazers	Filoil Flying V Arena, San Juan
January 25; 04:00 PM (UTC+08:00)	(25–22, 25–19, 26–28, 25–23)			Filoil Flying V Arena, San Juan

January 28; 03:30 PM (UTC+08:00)	San Sebastian Lady Stags	1–3	Benilde Lady Blazers	Filoil Flying V Arena, San Juan
January 28; 03:30 PM (UTC+08:00)	(22–25, 23–25, 25–22, 22–25)			Filoil Flying V Arena, San Juan

- Finals' Most Valuable Player: Jeanette Panaga ( CSB)
- Coach of the Year: Michael Cariño ( CSB)

=== Awards ===
- Season Most Valuable Player: Grethcel Soltones ( San Sebastian)
- Rookie of the Year: Nieza Viray ( San Beda)
- Best server: Maria Shola May Alvarez ( JRU)
- Best spiker: Christine Joy Rosario ( Arellano)
- Best blocker: Jeanette Panaga ( CSB)
- Best setter: Rhea Marist Ramirez ( Arellano)
- Best receiver: Melanie Torres ( CSB)
- Best digger: Alyssa Eroa ( San Sebastian)
- Best scorer: Grethcel Soltones ( San Sebastian)

== Men's tournament ==
=== Elimination round ===
Pos	Team	Pld	W	L	Pts	SW	SL	SR	SPW	SPL	SPR	Qualification
1	EAC Generals	9	8	1	24	26	6	4.333	765	631	1.212	Qualified to the semifinals with a twice-to-beat advantage
2	Perpetual Altas	9	8	1	22	24	8	3.000	755	643	1.174	Qualified to the semifinals with a twice-to-beat advantage
3	Benilde Blazers	9	7	2	20	22	10	2.200	751	659	1.140	Qualified to the semifinals first-round playoff
4	San Beda Red Lions	9	5	4	16	21	16	1.313	823	817	1.007	Qualified to the semifinals first-round playoff
5	Arellano Chiefs	9	5	4	14	18	16	1.125	746	715	1.043	Qualified to fourth-seed playoff
6	Lyceum Pirates	9	4	5	13	19	19	1.000	816	833	0.980	
7	San Sebastian Stags	9	3	6	9	10	19	0.526	623	694	0.898	
8	Mapúa Cardinals	9	3	6	9	10	20	0.500	648	699	0.927	
9	Letran Knights (H)	9	2	7	7	11	22	0.500	711	786	0.905	
10	JRU Heavy Bombers	9	0	9	1	2	27	0.074	572	713	0.802	

(H) Season host

Point system:

- 3 points = win match in 3 or 4 sets
- 2 points = win match in 5 sets
- 1 point = lose match in 5 sets
- 0 point = lose match in 3 or 4 sets

=== Playoffs ===
Fourth-seed playoff
San Beda	3
Arellano	1

Semifinals; Top seeds twice-to-beat
1	EAC	3
4	San Beda	2
2	Perpetual	3
3	Benilde	2

Finals; Best-of-three series
1	EAC	3	1	2
2	Perpetual	1	3	3

- Finals' Most Valuable Player: Rey Taneo Jr. ( Perpetual)
- Coach of the Year: Sinfronio Acaylar ( Perpetual)

=== Awards ===
- Season Most Valuable Player: Howard Mojica (EAC)
- Rookie of the Year: Walt Amber Gervacio ( San Sebastian)
- Best server: Howard Mojica ( EAC)
- Best spiker: Howard Mojica ( EAC)
- Best blocker: Angelino Pertierra ( Mapúa)
- Best setter: John Carlos Desuyo ( San Beda)
- Best receiver: Ajian Dy ( CSB)
- Best digger: Dion Canlas ( Mapúa)
- Best scorer: Howard Mojica ( EAC)

== Juniors Tournament ==
Perpetual Help Altas retained their NCAA Season 91 Junior's Volleyball title after defeating EAC Generals in two games. Jody Severo is the Finals MVP.

=== Awards ===
- Most valuable player (Season): Ralph Joshua Pitogo ( EAC)
- Most valuable player (Finals): Jody Severo ( UPHSD)
- Coach of the Year: Sandy Rieta ( UPHSD)
- Rookie of the Year: Ralph Joshua Pitogo ( EAC)
- Best server: Michael Vince Imperial ( EAC)
- Best spiker: Ryuji Condrad Etorma ( UPHSD)
- Best blocker: Ralph Joshua Pitogo ( EAC)
- Best setter: Gabriel EJ Casana ( UPHSD)
- Best receiver: Ceejay Hicap ( EAC)
- Best digger: Barrie Roldan ( Arellano)
- Best scorer: Aldimal Waham ( Arellano)

== Beach volleyball ==
The NCAA Season 91 beach volleyball tournament will be held on February 10–14, 2016 at the Marina Bay Resort, Subic, Zambales. These are the winners in the four-day event that has been televised on ABS-CBN Sports and Action on February 16.

Division	Team	Players	Opponent/Score
Women's Division	San Sebastian Lady Stags	Grethcel Soltones (MVP), Dangie Encarnacion and Alyssa Eroa	def. San Beda Red Lionesses, 14–21, 21–9, 15–6
Men's Division	Mapúa Cardinals	Paul John Cuzon (MVP), Philip Michael Bagalay, Samuel Joseph Almalel	def. Perpetual Help Altas, 21–19, 21–18
Juniors Division	San Sebastian Stags	Raxel Redd Catris, Stephen John Sundiang, Romeo Teodones Jr.	def. EAC Brigadiers, 20–22, 21–19, 15–13

== See also ==
- UAAP Season 78 volleyball tournaments
- NCAA Season 91

Preceded by Season 90 (2014)	NCAA volleyball seasons Season 91 (2015)	Succeeded by Season 92 (2016)
