= San Beda Red Lions, Red Lionesses and Red Cubs =

College varsity teams

San Beda Red Lions and Lionesses
- School: San Beda University
- Location: Seniors' team Mendiola, Manila; Juniors' team Taytay, Rizal
- Team colors: Red and White
- Women's team: Red Lionesses
- Juniors' team: Red Cubs

Seniors' general championships
- NCAA: 9 (2010–11, 2011–2012, 2012–2013, 2014–2015, 2015-2016, 2016-2017, 2017-2018 , 2018-2019, 2023-2024, 2024-2025)

Juniors' general championships
- NCAA: 16 (1982–83, 1988–89, 1989–90, 1990–91, 1991–92, 1993–94, 1995–96, 1996–97, 1997–98, 2013–14, 2014–15, 2015–16, 2016-17, 2017-2018, 2024-2025, 2025-2026)

The San Beda Red Lions and Lionesses are the collegiate varsity teams of the San Beda University, best known for their basketball section.

== Name ==
San Beda is named after the Venerable Bede of England. In honor of Venerable Bede who is an English man, the school chose the Red Lion Rampant which is the heraldic symbol of the ancient Scots/English for courage as part of its school logo. San Beda pays tribute to the courage of the Benedictine monks by adopting the Red Lion, the symbol of courage in the Catholic tradition and in the land of St. Bede.

== History ==
=== Red Lions Battlecry ===
2006: End 28 @ 82 – for their quest to conclude the 28 years of seniors basketball championship title drought
2007: Back-to-back @ 83 – for their bid to have a back-to-back title
2008: DYNASthree – for their bid to gain back-to-back-to-back titles
2009: Animo Quatro – their bid to have the first 4-peat
2010: REDemption – for their bid to regain the NCAA title in 2010
2011: REDomination – for their bid to have a back-to-back title again in 2011
2012: R3peat The 3peat – for their bid to have a back-to-back-to-back titles since 2009
2013: Roar For Four – for their bid to have their school's first 4-peat
2014: Go San Beda Five – for their bid for that unprecedented 5-peat
2015: Witness 6reatness – for their bid to have the first 6-peat in NCAA history
2016: REDemption 2.0 – for their bid to regain the NCAA title and the quest for the 20th overall basketball title
2017: #RoarAsOne for banner 21 – for their bid to have a back-to-back title, 21st overall
2018: Defend The Thron3 – for their bid to have a back-to-back-to-back title, 22nd overall
2019: Four The Win – for their bid to have a 4-peat title, 23rd overall
2023: 23@23 – for their bid to regain the NCAA title to give San Beda the 23rd championship title
2025: One More for 24 – for their bid to regain the NCAA title to give San Beda the 24th championship title

=== Red Cubs Battlecry ===
2012: Roar For More – for their bid to have their school's first 4-peat
2013: Drive for FiVe – for their bid to have their school's first 5-peat
2014: ThisSixIt – for their bid for that unprecedented 6-peat
2015: Red Cubs Never S7op – for their bid to have the first 7-peat in NCAA history
2016: Make8Happen – for their bid to have the first 8-peat in NCAA history
2017: #REDemption – for their bid to regain the juniors basketball title
2019: #LetsBring1tBack - for their bid to clinch the juniors basketball title after a four-year drought

== Notable players ==
=== Red Lions ===
- Yousif Aljamal
- Baser Amer
- Robert Bolick
- Charles Borck
- Anjo Caram
- Kemark Cariño
- Arthur dela Cruz
- Pong Escobal
- Riego Gamalinda
- Borgie Hermida
- Abe King
- Garvo Lanete
- Frankie Lim
- Carlos Loyzaga
- Chito Loyzaga
- Joey Loyzaga
- Dave Marcelo
- Ogie Menor
- Javee Mocon
- Evan Nelle
- Calvin Oftana
- Andre Paras
- Nel Parado
- Jake Pascual
- Kyle Pascual
- Mat Ranillo III
- Alberto Reynoso
- Rome dela Rosa
- Anthony Semerad
- David Semerad
- Jay-R Taganas
- Boybits Victoria

=== Red Cubs ===
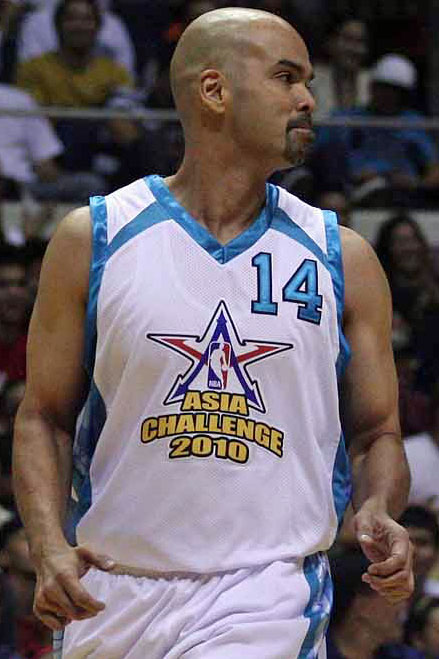
Venancio "Benjie" Paras, considered one of the best San Beda Red Cub of all time.

- Ryan Monteclaro
- Claiford Arao
- Mike Baldos
- Giboy Babilonia
- Yuri Escueta
- Alfonzo Gotladera
- Magnum Membrere
- Nico Salva
- LA Tenorio
- Tyrone Bautista
- Joshua Caracut
- JV Casio
- Teddy Monasterio
- Evan Nelle
- Dindo Pumaren
- LA Revilla
- Ren-Ren Ritualo
- Gerry Esplana
- Axel Iñigo
- Ronald Magtulis
- Ernest Medina
- Miko Roldan
- Arvin Tolentino
- Jonas Villanueva
- Adven Jess Diputado
- Germy Mahinay
- Jolly Escobar
- Chris Javier
- James Martinez
- Jay Agbayani
- Toti Almeda
- Eric Altamirano
- Arvin Braganza
- Mike Bravo
- Paul Du
- Chris Hubilla
- Ronnie Magsanoc
- Joey Mendoza
- Jenkins Mesina
- Xavier Nunag
- Alvin Padilla
- Benjie Paras
- Duane Salvatera
- Jonjon Tabique
- Rhayyan Amsali
- Udoy Belmonte
- JM Lagumen
- Aljon Mariano
- Chris Calaguio
- Samboy Lim
- Baldwin Combate
- Christian Coronel
- Mark Mañosca
- Bong Salvador
- Jeric Raval
- JR Alba
- Macky De Joya
- Serafin Hilvano
- Bebe Terminez
- Von Chavez

=== Retired Number ===
San Beda Red Lions retired numbers
No.	Player	Position	Ceremony Date
14	Carlos Loyzaga	Center	June 25, 2016

== Football ==
Dubbed the "Red Booters", the San Beda football team has been a consistent championship contender for the past few years in the NCAA. The seniors team has won the NCAA championship for the last 6 years and has won a total of 14 championships, second only to De La Salle University in all-time wins.

== Swimming ==
The San Beda Red Sea Lions is one of the veteran teams, alongside Mapua University in the NCAA swimming championships, and is the winningest sports team of San Beda. The domination of the San Beda Red Sea Lions started in NCAA Season 78 in 2002 when they halted the 3-peat run of Philippine Christian University. As of NCAA Season 100, the men's team is currently the 21-peat champions, meanwhile the women's team is currently the 1-peat champions.

=== Red Sea Lions battle cry ===
2019: Protect The Dream - for their 18-peat bid for the men's team and 8-peat for the women's team
2022: #DefendTheCrown - for their 19-peat bid for the men's team and 9-peat for the women's team
2023: #ExtendTheDynasty - for their 20-peat bid for the men's team and 10-peat for the women's team
2024: #UpholdTheGlory - for their 21-peat bid for the men's team and 11-peat for the women's team

=== Junior Red Sea Lions Battlecry ===
2023: #ReclaimTheCrown – for their bid to regain the juniors swimming title
2024: #EndTheDrought – for their bid to bring back the juniors swimming title to San Beda

== Volleyball ==
=== Women's volleyball roster ===
NCAA Season 95

San Beda Red Lionesses
No.	Name	Position
1	MATIAS, Lynn Robyn	Setter
2	TANNAGAN, China S.	Open Spiker
3	MANZANO, Kimberly Grace	
5	RACRAQUIN, Daryl Sigrid C.	Libero
6	MAÑALAC, Patricia Mae	
7	TAYAG, Maxine Koyce	
8	BUNO, Justine Marie	Libero
9	VIRAY, Maria Nieza C.	Open Spiker
10	GALANG, Mikaela Joy	Middle Blocker
13	PARAS, Trisha Mae S.	Middle Blocker
14	SALANGSANG, Francesca Louise	
15	CENZON, Patricia Ysabel	
16	VIRAY, Maria Jiezela C.	Opposite Spiker
17	DIOSO, Kyla Jeremae	
18	RACRAQUIN, Aurea Francesca C. (c)	Open Spiker

- Head Coach: Nemesio Gavino
- Assistant coach: Richard Cuevas

=== Men's volleyball roster ===
NCAA Season 93

San Beda Red Spikers
No.	Name	Position
1	AMAGAN, Jomaru	Open Spiker
2	GENOBATEN, Gian Carlo S.	Open Spiker
3	TORRES, Angelo Michael	Middle Blocker
4	VIRAY, Adrian D.	Open Spiker
5	MANLICLIC, Yeshua Felix Emmanuel	
6	PATENIO, Limuel	Opposite Spiker
7	CASIN, Rodel Nelas	Libero
9	ULIBAS, Ferdinand Jr. T.	
11	ENCISO, Mark Christian S.	Opposite Spiker
14	GONZALES, Earl Kenneth R.	
15	SANTOS, Mark Lorenze S. (c)	Open Spiker
16	DESUYO, John Carlo P.	
17	ZABALA, Gerard B.	
18	DECANO, Mark Joel	Reserve

- Head coach: Ernesto Pamilar
- Assistant coach: Alegro Carpio

=== Boys' volleyball roster ===
NCAA Season 91

#	Name
1.)	Juan Carlos Cuevas
3.)	Evander Matthew Colong
4.)	Aron Jester Santos
5.)	Jansel Jonathan Galolo
6.)	Nico Dizon
7.)	Mark Reinel Villamor
8.)	Juan Manuel Ilagan
10.)	Francis Miguel Palma
12.)	Jim Philip Velarde
13.)	Frentzen Vendollo
14.)	Lorenzo Macaso
18.)	Kristan Panagao

Coach: Nemesio Gavino

=== Beach volleyball ===
NCAA Season 93

Women's

- Trisha Mae S. Paras
- Maria Jeziela C. Viray
- Maria Nieza C. Viray

Men's

- Jomaru Amagan
- Mark Christian S. Enciso
- Ferdinand T. Ulibas Jr.
- Adrian D. Viray

Juniors

- Lance Andrei de Castro
- Franz Nico Dizon
- Juwan Miguel Ilagan

=== Notable players ===
==== Women's ====
- NCAA Season 93 beach volleyball champions

- Trisha Mae Paras, Maria Jeziela Viray, Maria Nieza Viray

- Maria Jeziela Viray

- NCAA Season 93 beach volleyball MVP

- Cesca Racraquin

- NCAA Season 92 Rookie of the Year

- Maria Nieza Viray

- NCAA Season 91 Rookie of the Year

- Frances Molina
- Janine Marciano
- Andrea Abaya

==== Men's ====
- Limuel Patenio

- NCAA Season 93 2nd Best Middle Blocker

- Mark Christian Encisco

- NCAA Season 93 Best Opposite Spiker

=== WNCAA ===
The San Beda Alabang girls' volleyball team won the 39th WNCAA championship title. They are the first juniors team to bring a volleyball championship title to their alma mater.

== Soft tennis ==
The San Beda's women's soft tennis team, headed by team captain Alyana Victoria and head coach Jovy Mamawal, won two consecutive titles in the NCAA soft tennis event in Seasons 90 and 91. Aside from their championships, The Red Lionesses represented the country in the University Soft Tennis Championships in 2015 held at South Korea.

== See also ==
- San Beda University
- San Beda–Letran rivalry
- San Beda–Perpetual rivalry
- San Beda–San Sebastian rivalry
- Arellano–San Beda rivalry
