= NCAA general championships =

Overall championship

NCAA Philippines overall championship
- Founded: 1960
- Country: Philippines
- Most recent champions: Seniors' division: San Beda University; Juniors' division: San Beda University–Rizal
- Most titles: Seniors' division: Mapúa University (19 titles); Juniors' division: San Beda University–Rizal (15 titles)

The National Collegiate Athletic Association General Championship is awarded to the school with the most points garnered in an academic year in the NCAA. It is split into the Juniors' division (for male high school students) and to the Seniors' division (for college students).

The champion school in a given sport receives 30 points, with the runner-up receiving 20, and the last place receiving one point. All of the points from the different sports are then tabulated, and the school with the most points is the General Champion. Only sports that are official are included (cheerleading is excluded).

The awarded school is judged as the best athletic program in the NCAA for the given academic year.

The General Championship is similar to the NACDA Director's Cup of the American NCAA.

== Points distribution ==
| Finish | Current | Previous |
|---|---|---|
| Champion | 40 | 40 |
| 2nd | 35 | 30 |
| 3rd | 30 | 20 |
| 4th | 25 | 15 |
| 5th | 20 | 10 |
| 6th | 10 | 8 |
| 7th | 9 | 6 |
| 8th | 8 | 5 |
| 9th | 4 | -- |
| 10th | 2 | -- |

== General champions ==
| Denotes school won both juniors' and seniors' championship in the same year. |

=== Early years ===
The NCAA was founded by Ateneo, La Salle, FEU, NU, San Beda, UM, UP and UST in 1924. Only in 1960 the NCAA started the general championship race during the time of Ateneo, Letran, La Salle, JRC, Mapúa and San Beda also known as the old-timer six.

| Academic Year | Seniors | Juniors |
|---|---|---|
| 1960–61 | Mapúa Institute of Technology (1) | Not awarded |
| 1961–64 | | Not awarded |
| 1964–65 | Mapúa Institute of Technology (2) | Mapúa Institute of Technology (1) |
| 1965–66 | Mapúa Institute of Technology (3) | De La Salle College (1) |
| 1966–67 | Mapúa Institute of Technology (4) | De La Salle College (2) |
| 1967–68 | Mapúa Institute of Technology (5) | Ateneo de Manila University (1) |
| 1968–69 | Ateneo de Manila University (1) | Mapúa Institute of Technology (2) |

=== First expansion ===
San Sebastian was added. Trinity was also added as a full member in 1974; it left the league in 1986.

| Academic Year | Seniors | Juniors |
|---|---|---|
| 1969–70 | Mapúa Institute of Technology (6) | Mapúa Institute of Technology (3) |
| 1970–71 | Mapúa Institute of Technology (7) | Mapúa Institute of Technology (4) |
| 1971–72 | Mapúa Institute of Technology (8) | La Salle Green Hills (1) |
| 1972–73 | De La Salle College (1) | Mapúa Institute of Technology (5) |
| 1973–74 | Mapúa Institute of Technology (9) | La Salle Green Hills (2) |
| 1974–75 | De La Salle College (2) | La Salle Green Hills (3) |
| 1975–76 | Mapúa Institute of Technology (10) | La Salle Green Hills (4) |
| 1976–77 | De La Salle University (3) | Ateneo de Manila University (2) |
| 1977–78 | De La Salle University (4) | La Salle Green Hills (5) |

=== First contraction ===
Ateneo left in 1978 followed by La Salle in 1980.

| Academic Year | Seniors | Juniors |
|---|---|---|
| 1978–79 | Mapúa Institute of Technology (11) | La Salle Green Hills (6) |
| 1979–80 | Colegio de San Juan de Letran (1) | La Salle Green Hills (7) |
| 1980–81 | De La Salle University (5); Mapúa Institute of Technology (12) | La Salle Green Hills (8) |
| 1981–82 | Not awarded | |
| 1982–83 | Mapúa Institute of Technology (13) | San Beda College (1) |
| 1983–84 | Mapúa Institute of Technology (14) | Colegio de San Juan de Letran (1) |

=== Second expansion ===
Perpetual Help College of Rizal was added in 1984, the same year San Beda left which rejoined in 1986.

| Academic Year | Seniors | Juniors |
|---|---|---|
| 1984–85 | San Sebastian College–Recoletos (1) | San Sebastian College–Recoletos (1) |
| 1985–86 | Not awarded | Mapúa Institute of Technology (6) |
| 1986–87 | Mapúa Institute of Technology (15) | Colegio de San Juan de Letran (2) |
| 1987–88 | Colegio de San Juan de Letran (16) | Colegio de San Juan de Letran (3) |
| 1988–89 | San Sebastian College–Recoletos (2) | San Beda College (2) |
| 1989–90 | San Sebastian College–Recoletos (3) | San Beda College (3) |
| 1990–91 | Mapúa Institute of Technology (16) | San Beda College (4) |
| 1991–92 | Mapúa Institute of Technology (17) | San Beda College (5) |
| 1992–93 | Mapúa Institute of Technology (18) | San Sebastian College–Recoletos (2) |
| 1993–94 | Mapúa Institute of Technology (19) | San Beda College (6) |
| 1994–95 | San Sebastian College–Recoletos (4) | Mapúa Institute of Technology (7) |
| 1995–96 | Perpetual Help College of Rizal (1) | San Beda College (7) |

=== Third expansion ===
In 1996, PCU became a member and followed by CSB in 1998. PCU was suspended in 2007 and had an indefinite leave in 2009.

| Academic Year | Seniors | Juniors |
|---|---|---|
| 1996–97 | University of Perpetual Help Rizal (2) | San Beda College (8) |
| 1997–98 | Colegio de San Juan de Letran (2) | San Beda College (9) |
| 1998–99 | Colegio de San Juan de Letran (3) | Colegio de San Juan de Letran (4) |
| 1999–00 | Colegio de San Juan de Letran (4) | Colegio de San Juan de Letran (5) |
| 2000–01 | Colegio de San Juan de Letran (5) | Colegio de San Juan de Letran (6) |
| 2001–02 | Colegio de San Juan de Letran (6) | Colegio de San Juan de Letran (7) |
| 2002–03 | Colegio de San Juan de Letran (7) | Colegio de San Juan de Letran (8) |
| 2003–04 | Colegio de San Juan de Letran (8) | La Salle Green Hills (9) |
| 2004–05 | Philippine Christian University (1) | La Salle Green Hills (10) |
| 2005–06 | De La Salle–College of Saint Benilde (1) | San Sebastian College–Recoletos (3)* |
| 2006–07 | Philippine Christian University (2) | San Sebastian College–Recoletos (4) |
| 2007–08 | De La Salle–College of Saint Benilde (2) | La Salle Green Hills (11) |
| 2008–09 | De La Salle–College of Saint Benilde (3) | La Salle Green Hills (12) |

Note: *In the 2005-06 season, San Sebastian College - Recoletos had more championships (4) than La Salle Green Hills (3), San Sebastian won the General Championship, despite being tied for first place.

=== Fourth expansion ===
In 2009, AUF, Arellano and EAC were added as guest members. Only Arellano and EAC were accepted as probationary members. Lyceum was added as a guest member in 2011. In 2013, Arellano was granted full membership, followed by EAC and Lyceum in 2015.

| Academic Year | Seniors | Juniors |
|---|---|---|
| 2009–10 | Colegio de San Juan de Letran (9) | San Sebastian College–Recoletos (5) |
| 2010–11 | San Beda College (1) | San Sebastian College–Recoletos (6) |
| 2011–12 | San Beda College (2) | San Sebastian College–Recoletos (7) |
| 2012–13 | San Beda College (3) | San Sebastian College–Recoletos (8) |
| 2013–14 | De La Salle–College of Saint Benilde (4) | San Beda College–Rizal (10) |
| 2014–15 | De La Salle–College of Saint Benilde (5) | San Beda College–Rizal (11) |
| 2015–16 | San Beda College (4) | San Beda College–Rizal (12) |
| 2016–17 | San Beda College (5) | San Beda College–Rizal (13) |
| 2017–18 | San Beda University (6) | San Beda University–Rizal (14) |
| 2018–19 | San Beda University (7) | University of Perpetual Help System DALTA (1) |
| 2019–20 | Not awarded due to the 2020 coronavirus pandemic in Metro Manila. | |
| 2020–21 | Not awarded due to the 2020 coronavirus pandemic in Metro Manila. | |
| 2021–22 | Not awarded due to not all sports being celebrated. | |
| 2022–23 | Not awarded due to not all sports being celebrated. | |
| 2023–24 | San Beda University (8) | University of Perpetual Help System DALTA (2) |
| 2024–25 | San Beda University (9) | San Beda University–Rizal (15) |
| 2025–26 | De La Salle–College of Saint Benilde (5) | San Beda University–Rizal (16) |

== Number of general championships by school ==
The school left the league

| School | Seniors | Juniors | Total |
|---|---|---|---|
| Mapúa University | 19 | 8 | 27 |
| San Beda University | 9 | 16 | 25 |
| Colegio de San Juan de Letran | 9 | 8 | 17 |
| La Salle Green Hills | 0 | 12 | 12 |
| San Sebastian College–Recoletos | 4 | 6 | 10 |
| De La Salle University | 5 | 2 | 7 |
| De La Salle–College of Saint Benilde | 5 | 0 | 5 |
| University of Perpetual Help System DALTA | 2 | 2 | 4 |
| Ateneo de Manila University | 1 | 2 | 3 |
| Philippine Christian University | 2 | 0 | 2 |

NOTE

- LSGH, an NCAA juniors team, won eight (8) general championships as the DLSU juniors team and four (4) as the CSB juniors team.

== Total NCAA Championships per school ==
The school left the league

| School | Athletics | Badminton | Basketball | 3×3 basketball | Beach volleyball | Cheerleading | Chess | Esports | Football | Golf | Lawn Tennis | Soft Tennis | Softball | Street dance | Swimming | Table tennis | Taekwondo | Volleyball | Total |
|---|---|---|---|---|---|---|---|---|---|---|---|---|---|---|---|---|---|---|---|
| San Beda University | 9 | 7 | 47 | 2 | 4 | 0 | 11 | 0 | 46 | 1 | 38 | 10 | 5 | 0 | 66 | 26 | 23 | 4 | 299 |
| Mapúa University (Note: The Mapúa High School was closed down in 2005. Since 2008, the Malayan High School of Science Red Robins represented Mapúa University in the juniors' division.) | 39 | 0 | 26 | 0 | 1 | 1 | 17 | 0 | 19 | 0 | 36 | 0 | 13 | 0 | 62 | 5 | 0 | 12 | 231 |
| Colegio de San Juan de Letran | 12 | 5 | 35 | 0 | 8 | 0 | 20 | 0 | 12 | 0 | 18 | 0 | 1 | 0 | 4 | 30 | 9 | 26 | 180 |
| San Sebastian College–Recoletos | 15 | 4 | 17 | 0 | 9 | 0 | 23 | 0 | 0 | 0 | 10 | 0 | 2 | 0 | 2 | 9 | 2 | 47 | 140 |
| De La Salle University (Note: LSGH, a juniors team, has been playing in the NCAA as a junior to both DLSU and CSB, but has never been directly under either institution.) | 22 | 0 | 11 | 0 | 0 | 0 | 0 | 0 | 42 | 0 | 15 | 0 | 5 | 0 | 4 | 0 | 0 | 7 | 106 |
| La Salle Green Hills | 7 | 3 | 1 | 0 | 0 | 0 | 5 | 0 | 22 | 0 | 6 | 0 | 6 | 0 | 23 | 1 | 11 | 5 | 90 |
| De La Salle–College of Saint Benilde | 0 | 9 | 1 | 0 | 8 | 0 | 7 | 0 | 2 | 1 | 12 | 2 | 0 | 0 | 2 | 18 | 13 | 7 | 82 |
| University of Perpetual Help System DALTA | 5 | 0 | 1 | 1 | 11 | 9 | 3 | 0 | 2 | 0 | 5 | 2 | 0 | 1 | 4 | 5 | 0 | 32 | 81 |
| Ateneo de Manila University | 19 | 0 | 25 | 0 | 0 | 0 | 0 | 0 | 9 | 0 | 0 | 0 | 3 | 0 | 0 | 0 | 0 | 9 | 65 |
| José Rizal University | 14 | 0 | 14 | 4 | 0 | 1 | 0 | 0 | 0 | 0 | 12 | 0 | 0 | 0 | 0 | 0 | 0 | 0 | 45 |
| Arellano University | 3 | 3 | 1 | 1 | 5 | 8 | 2 | 0 | 2 | 0 | 1 | 0 | 0 | 0 | 0 | 1 | 3 | 6 | 36 |
| Philippine Christian University | 3 | 0 | 1 | 0 | 3 | 0 | 2 | 0 | 3 | 0 | 0 | 0 | 0 | 0 | 3 | 3 | 0 | 4 | 22 |
| Emilio Aguinaldo College | 5 | 1 | 2 | 0 | 8 | 0 | 0 | 0 | 0 | 0 | 0 | 0 | 0 | 0 | 0 | 0 | 0 | 5 | 21 |
| University of the Philippines Diliman | 6 | 0 | 7 | 0 | 0 | 0 | 0 | 0 | 0 | 0 | 1 | 0 | 0 | 0 | 3 | 0 | 0 | 0 | 17 |
| University of Santo Tomas | 0 | 0 | 1 | 0 | 0 | 0 | 0 | 0 | 4 | 0 | 4 | 0 | 0 | 0 | 1 | 1 | 0 | 0 | 11 |
| Lyceum of the Philippines University | 0 | 0 | 0 | 0 | 0 | 0 | 3 | 1 | 0 | 1 | 1 | 0 | 0 | 1 | 0 | 0 | 0 | 0 | 7 |
| Trinity College of Quezon City | 1 | 0 | 1 | 0 | 0 | 0 | 1 | 0 | 0 | 0 | 1 | 0 | 0 | 0 | 0 | 0 | 0 | 2 | 6 |
| National University | 2 | 0 | 0 | 0 | 0 | 0 | 0 | 0 | 0 | 0 | 0 | 0 | 0 | 0 | 0 | 0 | 0 | 0 | 2 |
| Saint Vincent de Paul | 0 | 0 | 0 | 0 | 0 | 0 | 0 | 0 | 1 | 0 | 0 | 0 | 0 | 0 | 0 | 0 | 0 | 0 | 1 |
| Far Eastern University | 0 | 0 | 1 | 0 | 0 | 0 | 0 | 0 | 0 | 0 | 0 | 0 | 0 | 0 | 0 | 0 | 0 | 0 | 1 |
| Angeles University Foundation | 0 | 0 | 0 | 0 | 0 | 0 | 0 | 0 | 0 | 0 | 0 | 0 | 0 | 0 | 0 | 0 | 0 | 0 | 0 |
| Centro Escolar University (Note: Centro Escolar University and Our Lady of Fatima University participated as guest schools in the NCAA Season 101 esports competition.) | 0 | 0 | 0 | 0 | 0 | 0 | 0 | 0 | 0 | 0 | 0 | 0 | 0 | 0 | 0 | 0 | 0 | 0 | 0 |
| Our Lady of Fatima University | 0 | 0 | 0 | 0 | 0 | 0 | 0 | 0 | 0 | 0 | 0 | 0 | 0 | 0 | 0 | 0 | 0 | 0 | 0 |
| University of Asia and the Pacific (Note: The University of Asia and the Pacific joined the NCAA Season 101 Golf tournament as a guest school.) | 0 | 0 | 0 | 0 | 0 | 0 | 0 | 0 | 0 | 0 | 0 | 0 | 0 | 0 | 0 | 0 | 0 | 0 | 0 |
| University of Manila | 0 | 0 | 0 | 0 | 0 | 0 | 0 | 0 | 0 | 0 | 0 | 0 | 0 | 0 | 0 | 0 | 0 | 0 | 0 |

Championship data as of November 16, 2026.

== See also ==
- UAAP Overall Championship
