= NCAA lawn tennis championships =

Lawn Tennis Championship

NCAA Lawn Tennis championship
- Sport: Lawn Tennis
- Founded: 1927
- Country: Philippines
- Most recent champions: Men's division: De La Salle–College of Saint Benilde; Women's division: De La Salle–College of Saint Benilde; Juniors' division: Malayan High School of Science
- Most titles: Men's division: Mapúa University, San Beda University (16 titles); Women's division: De La Salle–College of Saint Benilde (5 titles); Juniors' division: Mapúa University (18 titles)

The National Collegiate Athletic Association lawn tennis championship is held every second semester of the academic year. It is divided into the juniors' (high school) and seniors' (college) tournaments.

Mapúa University has the most championships both in the senior and junior divisions.

== Champions ==
Demonstration sport
There was no juniors' and seniors' team
Denotes school won double crown
Denotes school won triple crown

Academic Year	Men	Women	Juniors
1927–28		Not held	José Rizal College (1)
1928–29		Not held	José Rizal College (2)
1929–30		Not held	University of the Philippines Diliman (1)
1930–31		Not held	Not held
1931–32		Not held	San Beda College (1)
1932–33		Not held	Mapúa Institute of Technology (1)
1933–34		Not held	Mapúa Institute of Technology (2)
1934–35		Not held	José Rizal College (3)
1935–36	José Rizal College (1)	Not held	Not held
1936–37	José Rizal College (2)	Not held	Not held
1937–38	José Rizal College (3)	Not held	Not held
1938–39	José Rizal College (4)	Not held	Not held
1939–40	Ateneo de Manila (1)	Not held	José Rizal College (1)
1940–41	José Rizal College (5)	Not held	José Rizal College (2)
1941–42		Not held	Suspended
1942–47		Not held	Not held due to World War II
1947–48	San Beda College (1)	Not held	San Beda College (1)
1948–49	San Beda College (2)	Not held	San Beda College (2)
1949–50	San Beda College (3)	Not held	De La Salle College (1)
1950–51		Not held	Not held
1951–52	San Beda College (4)	Not held	De La Salle College (2)
1952–53	San Beda College (5)	Not held	De La Salle College (3)
1953–54	De La Salle College (1)	Not held	De La Salle College (4)
1954–55	De La Salle College (2)	Not held	Mapúa Institute of Technology (1)
1955–56	Colegio de San Juan de Letran (1)	Not held	Mapúa Institute of Technology (2)
1956–57	De La Salle College (3)	Not held	De La Salle College (5)
1957–58	De La Salle College (4)	Not held	Mapúa Institute of Technology (3)
1958–59	De La Salle College (5)	Not held	Mapúa Institute of Technology (4)
1959–60	Mapúa Institute of Technology (1)	Not held	De La Salle College (6)
1960–61	Mapúa Institute of Technology (2)	Not held	De La Salle College (7)
1961–62		Not held	Suspended
1962–65		Not held	Not held
1965–66	De La Salle College (6)	Not held	De La Salle College (8)
1966–67	Mapúa Institute of Technology (3)	Not held	Mapúa Institute of Technology (5)
1967–68	Mapúa Institute of Technology (4)	Not held	Mapúa Institute of Technology (6)
1968–69	San Beda College (6)	Not held	Mapúa Institute of Technology (7)
1969–70	José Rizal College (6)	Not held	Mapúa Institute of Technology (8)
1970–71	Mapúa Institute of Technology (5)	Not held	Mapúa Institute of Technology (9)
1971–72	San Sebastian College–Recoletos (1)	Not held	San Beda College (3)
1972–73	Mapúa Institute of Technology (6)	Not held	San Beda College (4)
1973–74		Not held	Not held
1974–75	José Rizal College (7)	Not held	San Beda College (5)
1975–76	Colegio de San Juan de Letran (2)	Not held	San Beda College (6)
1976–77	Mapúa Institute of Technology (7)	Not held	San Beda College (7)
1977–78	Mapúa Institute of Technology (8)	Not held	Mapúa Institute of Technology (10)
1978–79		Not held	Not held
1979–80	Mapúa Institute of Technology (9)	Not held	La Salle Green Hills (1)
1980–81	De La Salle University (7)	Not held	Mapúa Institute of Technology (11)
1981–82	Mapúa Institute of Technology (10)	Not held	Mapúa Institute of Technology (12)
1982–83	Mapúa Institute of Technology (11)	Not held	Colegio de San Juan de Letran (1)
1983–84	Mapúa Institute of Technology (12)	Not held	Mapúa Institute of Technology (13)
1984–85	Mapúa Institute of Technology (13)	Not held	Trinity College of Quezon City (1)
1985–86	Colegio de San Juan de Letran (3)	Not held	San Sebastian College–Recoletos (1)
1986–87	San Beda College (7)	Not held	San Beda College (8)
1987–88	San Beda College (8)	Not held	San Sebastian College–Recoletos (2)
1988–89	San Beda College (9)	Not held	San Beda College (9)
1989–90	San Beda College (10)	Not held	San Beda College (10)
1990–91	San Beda College (11)	Not held	Mapúa Institute of Technology (14)
1991–92	San Sebastian College–Recoletos (2)	Not held	Mapúa Institute of Technology (15)
1992–93	Mapúa Institute of Technology (14)	Not held	San Sebastian College–Recoletos (3)
1993–94	Mapúa Institute of Technology (15)	Not held	Mapúa Institute of Technology (16)
1994–95	Mapúa Institute of Technology (16)	Not held	San Sebastian College–Recoletos (4)
1995–96	Perpetual Help College of Rizal (1)	Not held	Perpetual Help College of Rizal (1)
1996–97	Perpetual Help College of Rizal (2)	Not held	San Beda College (11)
1997–98	San Beda College (12)	Not held	Mapúa Institute of Technology (17)
1998–99	San Beda College (13)	Not held	Colegio de San Juan de Letran (2)
1999–2000	Colegio de San Juan de Letran (4)	Not held	Colegio de San Juan de Letran (3)
2000–01	San Beda College (14)	Not held	Colegio de San Juan de Letran (4)
2001–02	Colegio de San Juan de Letran (5)	Not held	Colegio de San Juan de Letran (5)
2002–03	San Sebastian College–Recoletos (3)	Not held	La Salle Green Hills (2)
2003–04	De La Salle–College of Saint Benilde (1)	Not held	La Salle Green Hills (3)
2004–05	San Sebastian College–Recoletos (4)	Not held	La Salle Green Hills (4)
2005–06	San Sebastian College–Recoletos (5)	Not held	San Sebastian College–Recoletos (5)
2006–08		Not held	Not held
2008–09	Colegio de San Juan de Letran (6)	Not held	La Salle Green Hills (5)
2009–10	Colegio de San Juan de Letran (7)	Not held	San Beda College–Rizal (12)
2010–11	Colegio de San Juan de Letran (8)	Not held	San Beda College–Rizal (13)
2011–12	Colegio de San Juan de Letran (9)	Not held	Colegio de San Juan de Letran (6)
2012–13	University of Perpetual Help System DALTA (3)	Not held	Colegio de San Juan de Letran (7)
2013–14	Colegio de San Juan de Letran (10)	Not held	San Beda College–Rizal (14)
2014–15	Colegio de San Juan de Letran (11)	Not held	San Beda College–Rizal (15)
2015–16	San Beda College (15)	De La Salle–College of Saint Benilde (1)	San Beda College–Rizal (16)
2016–17	De La Salle–College of Saint Benilde (2)	De La Salle–College of Saint Benilde (2)	Arellano University (1)
2017–18	De La Salle–College of Saint Benilde (3)	San Beda College (1)	San Beda College–Rizal (17)
2018–19	San Beda University (16)	San Beda University (2)	Lyceum of the Philippines University–Cavite (1)
2019–20	De La Salle–College of Saint Benilde (4)	San Beda University (3)	
2020–21	Not held due to COVID-19 pandemic		
2021–22	Not held due to COVID-19 pandemic		
2022–23	Not held due to COVID-19 pandemic		
2023–24	De La Salle–College of Saint Benilde (5)	De La Salle–College of Saint Benilde (3)	La Salle Green Hills (6)
2024–25	De La Salle–College of Saint Benilde (6)	De La Salle–College of Saint Benilde (4)	University of Perpetual Help System DALTA (2)
2025–26	De La Salle–College of Saint Benilde (7)	De La Salle–College of Saint Benilde (5)	Malayan High School of Science (1)

== Number of championships by school ==
The school left the league

School	Men's	Women's	Team	Juniors'	Total
San Beda University	16	3	2	17	37
Mapúa University (Note: The Mapúa High School was closed down in 2005. Since 2008, the Malayan High School of Science Red Robins represented Mapúa University in the juniors' division.)	16	0	2	18	36
Colegio de San Juan de Letran	11	0	0	7	18
De La Salle University (Note: LSGH won one championship under DLSU and five championships under CSB.)	7	0	0	8	15
José Rizal University	7	0	3	2	12
De La Salle–College of Saint Benilde	7	5	0	0	12
San Sebastian College–Recoletos	5	0	0	5	10
La Salle Green Hills	0	0	0	6	6
University of Perpetual Help System DALTA	3	0	0	2	5
Lyceum of the Philippines University	0	0	0	1	1
Arellano University	0	0	0	1	1
Trinity College of Quezon City	0	0	0	1	1
University of the Philippines Diliman	0	0	1	0	1

== See also ==
- UAAP Tennis Championship
