= NCAA Season 92 =

- Host school: San Beda College
- Tagline: "Sports Builds Character: Achieving Breakthroughs at Season 92"

General
- Seniors: San Beda College
- Juniors: San Beda College–Rizal

Seniors' champions
| Sport | | Men | Women |
| Basketball | | San Beda | N/A |
| Volleyball | | Benilde | Arellano |
| Chess | | San Beda | |
| Taekwondo | | San Beda | Benilde |
| Table Tennis | | Benilde | San Beda |
| Lawn Tennis | | Benilde | Benilde |
| Soft Tennis | | San Beda | San Beda |
| Swimming | | San Beda | San Beda |
| Beach Volleyball | | Perpetual | San Sebastian |
| Track and Field | | Arellano | |
| Football | | San Beda | |
| Badminton | | Letran | Arellano |
| Poomsae | | Mapúa | |
- Cheerdance: Arellano (Ex - Coed)

Juniors' champions
| Sport | | Boys | Girls |
| Basketball | | Malayan | N/A |
| Volleyball | | Perpetual | |
| Chess | | Letran | |
| Taekwondo | | Arellano | |
| Table Tennis | | Arellano | |
| Lawn Tennis | | Arellano | |
| Swimming | | San Beda | |
| Beach Volleyball | | EAC | |
| Track and Field | | EAC | |
| Football | | San Beda | |
| Badminton | | Letran | |
- (NT) = No tournament; (DS) = Demonstration Sport; (Ex) = Exhibition;

NCAA Season 92 was the 2016–17 collegiate athletic year of the National Collegiate Athletic Association (NCAA) in the Philippines. It was hosted by the San Beda College. The turnover ceremony of the NCAA flag from Mapua to San Beda was held at the Pearl Manila Hotel on April 6, 2016.

The formal opening ceremonies, which was directed by theater play director Roxanne Lapus and choreographer Douglas Nierras, was held at the Mall of Asia Arena, Pasay on June 25, 2016. The highlight of the opening of NCAA Season 92 was the retirement ceremony of the #14 jersey of Philippine basketball legend Carlos Loyzaga by the host school, San Beda. This was followed by the first games of men's basketball preliminary round.

For the second year, ABS-CBN Sports and Action provided broadcast coverage for the NCAA Season 92.

== Sports calendar ==
This is the tentative calendar of events of the NCAA Season 92. The list includes the tournament host schools and the venues.

=== First semester ===
| Sport/Division | Event host | Opening date | Venue/s |
|---|---|---|---|
| Basketball (Seniors/Juniors) | San Beda | June 25, 2016 | FilOil Flying V Centre, Mall of Asia Arena |
| Chess (Seniors/Juniors) | JRU | August 6, 2016 | JRU Gym |
| Badminton (Seniors/Juniors) | EAC | August 31, 2016 | Rizal Memorial Badminton Hall |
| Swimming (Seniors/Juniors) | Mapúa | September 9, 2016 | Rizal Memorial Swimming Center |
| Table Tennis (Seniors/Juniors) | Letran | September 17, 2016 | Ninoy Aquino Stadium |
| Taekwondo (Seniors/Juniors) | Lyceum | October 14, 2016 | Colegio de San Juan de Letrán Gym |

=== Second semester ===
| Sport/Division | Event host | Opening date | Venue |
|---|---|---|---|
| Volleyball (Seniors) | Benilde | November 2016 | TBA |
| Lawn Tennis (Men's/Juniors) | | December 2016 | TBA |
| Soft Tennis (Women) | | January 2017 | TBA |
| Football (Seniors/Juniors) | | November 2016 | TBA |
| Beach Volleyball (Seniors/Juniors) | | February 2017 | TBA |
| Track and Field (Seniors/Juniors) | | Feb 2017 | TBA |
| Cheerleading | | March 7, 2017 | TBA |

== Basketball ==
The NCAA Season 92 basketball tournaments of the NCAA Season 92 will be commenced on June 25, 2016, at the Mall of Asia Arena, Pasay.

=== Seniors' tournament ===
==== Elimination round ====
| Pos | Team | W | L | PCT | GB | Qualification |
|---|---|---|---|---|---|---|
| 1 | San Beda Red Lions (H) | 14 | 4 | .778 (Note: First-seed playoff: San Beda 80–73 Arellano) | — | Twice-to-beat in the semifinals |
| 2 | Arellano Chiefs | 14 | 4 | .778 | — | Twice-to-beat in the semifinals |
| 3 | Mapúa Cardinals | 12 | 6 | .667 | 2 | Twice-to-win in the semifinals |
| 4 | Perpetual Altas | 11 | 7 | .611 | 3 | Twice-to-win in the semifinals |
| 5 | JRU Heavy Bombers | 9 | 9 | .500 (Note: Head-to-head record: JRU 1–1 Letran (JRU +2)) | 5 | |
| 6 | Letran Knights | 9 | 9 | .500 | 5 | |
| 7 | San Sebastian Stags | 8 | 10 | .444 | 6 | |
| 8 | EAC Generals | 6 | 12 | .333 (Note: Head-to-head record: EAC 2–0 Lyceum) | 8 | |
| 9 | Lyceum Pirates | 6 | 12 | .333 | 8 | |
| 10 | Benilde Blazers | 1 | 17 | .056 | 13 | |

Source: ABS-CBN Sports
Rules for classification: 1) winning percentage; 2) if tied for top 4, one-game playoff; 3) head-to-head record; 4) overall point differential
(H) Hosts

==== Playoffs ====
Semifinals (Nos. 1 & 2 have twice-to-beat advantage)
1 | San Beda | 83 | 78
4 | Perpetual | 87 | 63
2 | Arellano | 92
3 | Mapúa | 80

Finals (Best-of-three series)
1 | San Beda | 88 | 83
2 | Arellano | 85 | 73

=== Juniors' tournament ===
==== Elimination round ====
| Pos | Team | W | L | PCT | GB | Qualification |
|---|---|---|---|---|---|---|
| 1 | San Beda Red Cubs (H) | 17 | 1 | .944 | — | Twice-to-beat in the semifinals |
| 2 | Mapúa Red Robins | 15 | 3 | .833 | 2 | Twice-to-beat in the semifinals |
| 3 | La Salle Green Hills Greenies | 13 | 5 | .722 (Note: Third-seed playoff: LSGH 79–76 Arellano) | 4 | Twice-to-win in the semifinals |
| 4 | Arellano Braves | 13 | 5 | .722 | 4 | Twice-to-win in the semifinals |
| 5 | Lyceum Junior Pirates | 9 | 9 | .500 | 8 | |
| 6 | Letran Squires | 7 | 11 | .389 | 10 | |
| 7 | Perpetual Junior Altas | 5 | 13 | .278 (Note: Head-to-head record: Perpetual 2–0 JRU) | 12 | |
| 8 | JRU Light Bombers | 5 | 13 | .278 | 12 | |
| 9 | EAC–ICA Brigadiers | 4 | 14 | .222 | 13 | |
| 10 | San Sebastian Staglets | 2 | 16 | .111 | 15 | |

Source: ABS-CBN Sports
Rules for classification: 1) winning percentage; 2) if tied for top 4, one-game playoff; 3) head-to-head record; 4) overall point differential
(H) Hosts

==== Playoffs ====
Semifinals (Nos. 1 & 2 have twice-to-beat advantage)
1 | San Beda–Rizal | 84 | 102
4 | Arellano | 87 | 93
2 | Malayan | 88
3 | LSGH | 81

Finals (Best-of-three series)
1 | San Beda–Rizal | 64 | 81 | 67
2 | Malayan | 83 | 78 | 84

== Volleyball ==
The volleyball tournament of NCAA Season 92 started on November 14, 2016, at the Filoil Flying V Arena. College of Saint Benilde is the event host. All teams participate in an elimination round which is a round robin tournament. The top four teams qualify in the semifinals, where the unbeaten team bounces through the finals, with a thrice-to-beat advantage, higher-seeded team possesses the twice-to-beat advantage, or qualify to the first round. The winners qualify to the finals. Also starting this season, volleyball (men's and women's) will become the 4th mandatory sport (aside from basketball, athletics and swimming) for all NCAA member schools. Junior's volleyball will be soon to be followed.

=== Men's tournament ===
==== Elimination round ====
| Pos | Team | Pld | W | L | Pts | SW | SL | SR | SPW | SPL | SPR | Qualification |
|---|---|---|---|---|---|---|---|---|---|---|---|---|
| 1 | Perpetual Altas | 9 | 8 | 1 | 24 | 26 | 5 | 5.200 | 741 | 636 | 1.165 | Qualified to the semifinals with a twice-to-beat advantage |
| 2 | Benilde Blazers (H) | 9 | 8 | 1 | 24 | 24 | 7 | 3.429 | 772 | 645 | 1.197 | Qualified to the semifinals with a twice-to-beat advantage |
| 3 | San Beda Red Lions | 9 | 7 | 2 | 19 | 23 | 13 | 1.769 | 828 | 747 | 1.108 | Qualified to semifinals |
| 4 | Arellano Chiefs | 9 | 6 | 3 | 19 | 21 | 12 | 1.750 | 771 | 706 | 1.092 | Qualified to semifinals |
| 5 | Mapúa Cardinals | 9 | 5 | 4 | 14 | 17 | 16 | 1.063 | 726 | 735 | 0.988 | |
| 6 | Lyceum Pirates | 9 | 4 | 5 | 13 | 20 | 19 | 1.053 | 832 | 818 | 1.017 | |
| 7 | San Sebastian Stags | 9 | 3 | 6 | 7 | 11 | 23 | 0.478 | 698 | 784 | 0.890 | |
| 8 | Letran Knights | 9 | 2 | 7 | 7 | 11 | 23 | 0.478 | 690 | 773 | 0.893 | |
| 9 | EAC Generals | 9 | 1 | 8 | 5 | 9 | 24 | 0.375 | 676 | 764 | 0.885 | |
| 10 | JRU Heavy Bombers | 9 | 1 | 8 | 3 | 6 | 26 | 0.231 | 626 | 751 | 0.834 | |

(H) Season host

==== Playoffs ====
Semifinals (Nos. 1 & 2 have twice-to-beat advantage)
Benilde | 3
Arellano | 0
Perpetual | 3
San Beda | 2

Finals (Best-of-three series)
1 | Benilde | 3 | 3
2 | Perpetual | 0 | 2

=== Women's tournament ===
==== Elimination round ====
| Pos | Team | Pld | W | L | Pts | SW | SL | SR | SPW | SPL | SPR | Qualification |
|---|---|---|---|---|---|---|---|---|---|---|---|---|
| 1 | San Sebastian Lady Stags | 9 | 9 | 0 | 25 | 27 | 5 | 5.400 | 777 | 569 | 1.366 | Qualified to the finals with the thrice-to-beat advantage |
| 2 | Arellano Lady Chiefs | 9 | 8 | 1 | 25 | 26 | 7 | 3.714 | 792 | 635 | 1.247 | Qualified to the semifinals |
| 3 | Benilde Lady Blazers (H) | 9 | 6 | 3 | 18 | 21 | 15 | 1.400 | 795 | 733 | 1.085 | Qualified to the first-round playoff |
| 4 | San Beda Red Lionesses | 9 | 6 | 3 | 17 | 19 | 12 | 1.583 | 695 | 628 | 1.107 | Qualified to the first-round playoff |
| 5 | Perpetual Lady Altas | 9 | 5 | 4 | 15 | 18 | 13 | 1.385 | 700 | 666 | 1.051 | |
| 6 | Lyceum Lady Pirates | 9 | 5 | 4 | 13 | 15 | 16 | 0.938 | 689 | 673 | 1.024 | |
| 7 | JRU Lady Bombers | 9 | 3 | 6 | 8 | 11 | 21 | 0.524 | 632 | 737 | 0.858 | |
| 8 | Letran Lady Knights | 9 | 2 | 7 | 8 | 14 | 24 | 0.583 | 774 | 861 | 0.899 | |
| 9 | EAC Lady Generals | 9 | 1 | 8 | 4 | 6 | 24 | 0.250 | 564 | 708 | 0.797 | |
| 10 | Mapúa Lady Cardinals | 9 | 0 | 9 | 2 | 7 | 27 | 0.259 | 593 | 801 | 0.740 | |

(H) Season host

==== Playoffs ====
Stepladder round 1 (One-game playoff)
3 | Benilde | 3
4 | San Beda | 0

Semifinals (One-game playoff)
2 | Arellano | 3
3 | Benilde | 2

Finals (No. 1 seed has to win twice; opponent thrice)
1 | San Sebastian | 0 | 2 | 1
2 | Arellano | 3 | 3 | 3

=== Juniors' tournament ===
==== Elimination round ====
| Pos | Team | Pld | W | L | Pts | SW | SL | SR | SPW | SPL | SPR |
|---|---|---|---|---|---|---|---|---|---|---|---|
| 1 | San Beda Red Cubs | 0 | 0 | 0 | 0 | 0 | 0 | — | 0 | 0 | — |
| 2 | Perpetual Junior Altas | 0 | 0 | 0 | 0 | 0 | 0 | — | 0 | 0 | — |
| 3 | Arellano Braves | 0 | 0 | 0 | 0 | 0 | 0 | — | 0 | 0 | — |
| 4 | La Salle Green Hills Greenies (H) | 0 | 0 | 0 | 0 | 0 | 0 | — | 0 | 0 | — |
| 5 | Letran Squires | 0 | 0 | 0 | 0 | 0 | 0 | — | 0 | 0 | — |
| 6 | Lyceum Junior Pirates | 0 | 0 | 0 | 0 | 0 | 0 | — | 0 | 0 | — |
| 7 | EAC–ICA Brigadiers | 0 | 0 | 0 | 0 | 0 | 0 | — | 0 | 0 | — |
| 8 | San Sebastian Staglets | 0 | 0 | 0 | 0 | 0 | 0 | — | 0 | 0 | — |

(H) Season host

== Football ==
The football tournament started in November 2016 at the Rizal Memorial Football Field.

=== Seniors' tournament ===
==== Elimination round ====
===== Team standings =====
| Pos | Team | Pld | W | D | L | GF | GA | GD | Pts | Qualification |
|---|---|---|---|---|---|---|---|---|---|---|
| 1 | San Beda Red Lions | 6 | 6 | 0 | 0 | 39 | 2 | +37 | 18 | Round of four |
| 2 | Benilde Blazers | 5 | 4 | 0 | 1 | 7 | 5 | +2 | 12 | Round of four |
| 3 | Arellano Chiefs | 6 | 4 | 0 | 2 | 3 | 6 | −3 | 12 | Round of four |
| 4 | Lyceum Pirates | 5 | 2 | 0 | 3 | 0 | 3 | −3 | 6 | Round of four |
| 5 | Perpetual Altas | 5 | 2 | 0 | 3 | 0 | 5 | −5 | 6 | |
| 6 | EAC Generals | 6 | 1 | 0 | 5 | 0 | 13 | −13 | 3 | |
| 7 | Mapúa Cardinals | 5 | 0 | 0 | 5 | 2 | 18 | −16 | 0 | |

===== Match-up results =====
| Team ╲ Game | 1 | 2 | 3 | 4 | 5 | 6 |
|---|---|---|---|---|---|---|
| AU | EAC school colors | UPHD school colors | Mapua school colors | Lyceum school colors | CSB school colors | San Beda school colors |
| CSB | Mapua school colors | EAC school colors | UPHD school colors | Arellano school colors | San Beda school colors | Lyceum school colors |
| EAC | Arellano school colors | Lyceum school colors | CSB school colors | San Beda school colors | Mapua school colors | UPHD school colors |
| LPU | EAC school colors | UPHD school colors | Arellano school colors | San Beda school colors | Mapua school colors | CSB school colors |
| MIT | CSB school colors | San Beda school colors | Arellano school colors | EAC school colors | Lyceum school colors | UPHD school colors |
| SBC | UPHD school colors | Mapua school colors | EAC school colors | Lyceum school colors | CSB school colors | Arellano school colors |
| UPHSD | San Beda school colors | Arellano school colors | Lyceum school colors | CSB school colors | EAC school colors | Mapua school colors |

= Win; = Draw; = Loss

===== Scores =====
| Team | AU | CSB | EAC | LPU | MIT | SBC | UPHSD |
|---|---|---|---|---|---|---|---|
| AU | | 0–4 | 3–0 | 2–1 | 3–1 | 0–6 | 3–1 |
| CSB | | | 13–1 | – | 7–1 | 1–4 | 4–0 |
| EAC | | | | 0–5 | 3–0 | 0–10 | 1–3 |
| LPU | | | | | 2–1 | 0–3 | 0–1 |
| MIT | | | | | | 1–11 | – |
| SBC | | | | | | | 5–0 |
| UPHSD | | | | | | | |

Legend: Blue = left column team win; Yellow = draw; Red = top row team win.

=== Juniors' tournament ===
==== Elimination round ====
===== Team standings =====
| Pos | Team | Pld | W | D | L | GF | GA | GD | Pts | Qualification |
|---|---|---|---|---|---|---|---|---|---|---|
| 1 | La Salle Green Hills Greenies | 5 | 4 | 1 | 0 | 35 | 3 | +32 | 13 | Round of four |
| 2 | San Beda Red Cubs | 4 | 4 | 0 | 0 | 26 | 1 | +25 | 12 | Round of four |
| 3 | Arellano Braves | 4 | 3 | 0 | 1 | 19 | 3 | +16 | 9 | Round of four |
| 4 | Letran Squires | 4 | 1 | 1 | 2 | 5 | 6 | −1 | 4 | Round of four |
| 5 | Lyceum Junior Pirates | 4 | 1 | 0 | 3 | 2 | 25 | −23 | 3 | |
| 6 | EAC–ICA Brigadiers | 4 | 0 | 1 | 3 | 3 | 18 | −15 | 1 | |
| 7 | Perpetual Junior Altas | 4 | 0 | 0 | 4 | 1 | 35 | −34 | 0 | |

===== Match-up results =====
| Team ╲ Game | 1 | 2 | 3 | 4 | 5 | 6 |
|---|---|---|---|---|---|---|
| AU | EAC school colors | UPHD school colors | Letran school colors | CSB school colors | San Beda school colors | Lyceum school colors |
| CSJL | San Beda school colors | CSB school colors | Lyceum school colors | Arellano school colors | UPHD school colors | EAC school colors |
| LSGH | UPHD school colors | Letran school colors | EAC school colors | Lyceum school colors | Arellano school colors | San Beda school colors |
| EAC–ICA | Arellano school colors | San Beda school colors | CSB school colors | UPHD school colors | Lyceum school colors | Letran school colors |
| LPU | UPHD school colors | Letran school colors | CSB school colors | San Beda school colors | EAC school colors | Arellano school colors |
| SBC–R | Letran school colors | EAC school colors | UPHD school colors | Lyceum school colors | Arellano school colors | CSB school colors |
| UPHSD | CSB school colors | Lyceum school colors | Arellano school colors | San Beda school colors | EAC school colors | Letran school colors |

= Win; = Draw; = Loss

===== Scores =====
| Team | AU | CSJL | LSGH | EAC-ICA | LPU | SBC-R | UPHSD |
|---|---|---|---|---|---|---|---|
| AU | | – | 5–2 | – | – | – | – |
| CSJL | | | – | – | – | 0–2 | – |
| LSGH | | | | – | – | – | 12–1 |
| EAC-ICA | | | | | – | – | – |
| LPU | | | | | | – | – |
| SBC-R | | | | | | | – |
| UPHSD | | | | | | | |

Legend: Blue = left column team win; Yellow = draw; Red = top row team win.

== Chess ==
The chess tournament of NCAA Season 92 has been started on August 6, 2016, at the Jose Rizal University gym in Mandaluyong. Two-time defending champion Arellano Chiefs will defend the championship title against other participating chess teams.

=== Seniors tournament ===
==== Elimination round ====
| Rank | Team | Pld | W | D | L | Pts. | MP | Res. | SBFIDE |
|---|---|---|---|---|---|---|---|---|---|
| 1 | San Beda Red Lions | 9 | 9 | 0 | 0 | 32.5 | 18 | 0 | 518.50 |
| 2 | Arellano Chiefs | 9 | 7 | 1 | 1 | 27.0 | 15 | 0 | 410.00 |
| 3 | Lyceum Pirates | 9 | 7 | 0 | 2 | 23.0 | 14 | 0 | 366.00 |
| 4 | Benilde Blazers | 9 | 5 | 1 | 3 | 19.5 | 11 | 0 | 296.75 |
| 5 | Letran Knights | 9 | 5 | 1 | 3 | 15.5 | 11 | 0 | 252.00 |
| 6 | Mapúa Cardinals | 9 | 3 | 2 | 4 | 14.0 | 8 | 0 | 185.00 |
| 7 | **JRU Heavy Bombers** | 9 | 1 | 2 | 6 | 11.5 | 4 | 0 | 169.00 |
| 8 | San Sebastian Stags | 9 | 0 | 4 | 5 | 10.5 | 4 | 0 | 162.25 |
| 9 | Perpetual Altas | 9 | 1 | 2 | 6 | 9.0 | 4 | 0 | 108.50 |
| 10 | EAC Generals | 8 | 0 | 1 | 8 | 5.0 | 1 | 0 | 78.50 |

Qualified to the Round of Four

Event host in **boldface**

Match-up results

| Team ╲ Game | 1 | 2 | 3 | 4 | 5 | 6 | 7 | 8 | 9 |
|---|---|---|---|---|---|---|---|---|---|
| AU | EAC school colors | Lyceum school colors | CSB school colors | San Beda school colors | Letran school colors | Mapua school colors | JRU school colors | SSC-R school colors | UPHD school colors |
| CSJL | Mapua school colors | JRU school colors | SSC-R school colors | UPHD school colors | Arellano school colors | Lyceum school colors | CSB school colors | San Beda school colors | EAC school colors |
| CSB | SSC-R school colors | UPHD school colors | Arellano school colors | Lyceum school colors | EAC school colors | San Beda school colors | Letran school colors | Mapua school colors | JRU school colors |
| EAC | Arellano school colors | Mapua school colors | Lyceum school colors | JRU school colors | CSB school colors | SSC-R school colors | San Beda school colors | UPHD school colors | Letran school colors |
| JRU | San Beda school colors | Letran school colors | Mapua school colors | EAC school colors | SSC-R school colors | UPHD school colors | Arellano school colors | Lyceum school colors | CSB school colors |
| LPU | UPHD school colors | Arellano school colors | EAC school colors | CSB school colors | San Beda school colors | Letran school colors | Mapua school colors | JRU school colors | SSC-R school colors |
| MIT | Letran school colors | EAC school colors | JRU school colors | SSC-R school colors | UPHD school colors | Arellano school colors | Lyceum school colors | CSB school colors | San Beda school colors |
| SBC | JRU school colors | SSC-R school colors | UPHD school colors | Arellano school colors | Lyceum school colors | CSB school colors | EAC school colors | Letran school colors | Mapua school colors |
| SSC–R | CSB school colors | San Beda school colors | Letran school colors | Mapua school colors | JRU school colors | EAC school colors | UPHD school colors | Arellano school colors | Lyceum school colors |
| UPHSD | Lyceum school colors | CSB school colors | San Beda school colors | Letran school colors | Mapua school colors | JRU school colors | SSC-R school colors | EAC school colors | Arellano school colors |

= Win; = Draw; = Loss

===== Scores =====
| Team | AU | CSJL | CSB | EAC | JRU | LPU | MIT | SBC | SSC-R | UPHSD |
|---|---|---|---|---|---|---|---|---|---|---|
| AU | | 3.5–.5 | 3.5–.5 | 4–0 | 3.5–.5 | 2.5–1.5 | 2–2 | 1–3 | 3.5–.5 | 3.5–.5 |
| CSJL | | | 2–2 | 3.5–.5 | 2.5–1.5 | 1.5–2.5 | 3–1 | 0–4 | 2.5–1.5 | 3.5–.5 |
| CSB | | | | 4–0 | 3–1 | 1–3 | 3.5–.5 | 1–3 | 3.5–.5 | 4–0 |
| EAC | | | | | .5–3.5 | 0–4 | 1–3 | .5–3.5 | 2–2 | 1–3 |
| JRU | | | | | | .5–3.5 | 3–1 | .5–3.5 | 2–2 | 2–2 |
| LPU | | | | | | | 4–0 | .5–3.5 | 3–1 | 4–0 |
| MIT | | | | | | | | 0–4 | 2–2 | 2.5–1.5 |
| SBC | | | | | | | | | 4–0 | 4–0 |
| SSC-R | | | | | | | | | | 2–2 |
| UPHSD | | | | | | | | | | |

Legend: Blue = left column team win; Yellow = draw; Red = top row team win.

==== Round of Four ====
| Rank | Team | Pld | W | D | L | Pts. | MP | Res. | SBFIDE |
|---|---|---|---|---|---|---|---|---|---|
| 1st place, gold medalist(s) | San Beda Red Lions | 1 | 1 | 0 | 1 | **5.0** | – | – | – |
| 2 | Benilde Blazers | 1 | 1 | 0 | 1 | **4.0** | – | – | – |
| 3 | Lyceum Pirates | 1 | 1 | 0 | 1 | **3.5** | – | – | – |
| 4 | Arellano Chiefs | 1 | 1 | 0 | 1 | **3.5** | – | – | – |

Match-up results

| Team ╲ Game | 1 | 2 | 3 |
|---|---|---|---|
| AU | Lyceum school colors | San Beda school colors | CSB school colors |
| CSB | San Beda school colors | Lyceum school colors | Arellano school colors |
| LPU | Arellano school colors | CSB school colors | San Beda school colors |
| SBC | CSB school colors | Arellano school colors | Lyceum school colors |

= Win; = Draw; = Loss

===== Scores =====
| Team | AU | CSB | LPU | SBC |
|---|---|---|---|---|
| AU | | – | 1–3 | 2.5–1.5 |
| CSB | | | 3.5–.5 | .5–3.5 |
| LPU | | | | – |
| SBC | | | | |

Legend: Blue = left column team win; Yellow = draw; Red = top row team win.

=== Juniors tournament ===
==== Elimination round ====
| Rank | Team | Pld | W | D | L | Pts. | MP | Res. | SBFIDE |
|---|---|---|---|---|---|---|---|---|---|
| 1 | San Beda Red Cubs | 9 | 8 | 0 | 1 | 27.0 | 16 | 0 | 410.00 |
| 2 | Arellano Braves | 9 | 7 | 0 | 2 | 25.5 | 14 | 0 | 391.00 |
| 3 | Letran Squires | 9 | 6 | 1 | 2 | 24.5 | 13 | 0 | 366.75 |
| 4 | Lyceum Junior Pirates | 9 | 6 | 2 | 1 | 23.5 | 14 | 0 | 381.50 |
| 5 | San Sebastian Staglets | 9 | 4 | 3 | 2 | 20.0 | 11 | 0 | 301.00 |
| 6 | Perpetual Junior Altas | 9 | 3 | 2 | 4 | 20.0 | 8 | 0 | 266.00 |
| 7 | La Salle Green Hills Greenies | 9 | 3 | 2 | 4 | 17.5 | 8 | 0 | 250.50 |
| 8 | Mapúa Red Robins | 9 | 1 | 1 | 7 | 8.5 | 3 | 0 | 105.25 |
| 9 | **JRU Light Bombers** | 9 | 1 | 1 | 7 | 8.0 | 3 | 0 | 107.25 |
| 10 | EAC–ICA Brigadiers | 9 | 0 | 0 | 9 | 5.5 | 0 | 0 | 87.00 |

Qualified to the Round of Four

Event host in **boldface**

Match-up results

| Team ╲ Game | 1 | 2 | 3 | 4 | 5 | 6 | 7 | 8 | 9 |
|---|---|---|---|---|---|---|---|---|---|
| AU | EAC school colors | Lyceum school colors | CSB school colors | San Beda school colors | Letran school colors | Mapua school colors | JRU school colors | SSC-R school colors | UPHD school colors |
| CSJL | Mapua school colors | JRU school colors | SSC-R school colors | UPHD school colors | Arellano school colors | Lyceum school colors | CSB school colors | San Beda school colors | EAC school colors |
| LSGH | SSC-R school colors | UPHD school colors | Arellano school colors | Lyceum school colors | EAC school colors | San Beda school colors | Letran school colors | Mapua school colors | JRU school colors |
| EAC–ICA | Arellano school colors | Mapua school colors | Lyceum school colors | JRU school colors | CSB school colors | SSC-R school colors | San Beda school colors | UPHD school colors | Letran school colors |
| JRU | San Beda school colors | Letran school colors | Mapua school colors | EAC school colors | SSC-R school colors | UPHD school colors | Arellano school colors | Lyceum school colors | CSB school colors |
| LPU | UPHD school colors | Arellano school colors | EAC school colors | CSB school colors | San Beda school colors | Letran school colors | Mapua school colors | JRU school colors | SSC-R school colors |
| MHSS | Letran school colors | EAC school colors | JRU school colors | SSC-R school colors | UPHD school colors | Arellano school colors | Lyceum school colors | CSB school colors | San Beda school colors |
| SBC–R | JRU school colors | SSC-R school colors | UPHD school colors | Arellano school colors | Lyceum school colors | CSB school colors | EAC school colors | Letran school colors | Mapua school colors |
| SSC–R | CSB school colors | San Beda school colors | Letran school colors | Mapua school colors | JRU school colors | EAC school colors | UPHD school colors | Arellano school colors | Lyceum school colors |
| UPHSD | Lyceum school colors | CSB school colors | San Beda school colors | Letran school colors | Mapua school colors | JRU school colors | SSC-R school colors | EAC school colors | Arellano school colors |

= Win; = Draw; = Loss

===== Scores =====
| Team | AU | CSJL | LSGH | EAC-ICA | JRU | LPU | MHSS | SBC-R | SSC-R | UPHSD |
|---|---|---|---|---|---|---|---|---|---|---|
| AU | | 1.5–2.5 | 3–1 | 3–1 | 4–0 | 2.5–1.5 | 4–0 | 1.5–2.5 | 3–1 | 3–1 |
| CSJL | | | 3–1 | 4–0 | 3–1 | 1–3 | 4–0 | 1–3 | 2–2 | 4–0 |
| LSGH | | | | 3–1 | 3.5–.5 | 3–1 | 3–1 | 1–3 | 2–2 | 2–2 |
| EAC-ICA | | | | | 1.5–2.5 | 3–1 | 1–3 | 0–4 | 0–4 | 0–4 |
| JRU | | | | | | 0–4 | 2–2 | .5–3.5 | 1.5–2.5 | 0–4 |
| LPU | | | | | | | 2.5–1.5 | 2.5–1.5 | 2–2 | 2–2 |
| MHSS | | | | | | | | 0–4 | 1–3 | 0–4 |
| SBC-R | | | | | | | | | 3–1 | 2.5–1.5 |
| SSC-R | | | | | | | | | | 2.5–1.5 |
| UPHSD | | | | | | | | | | |

Legend: Blue = left column team win; Yellow = draw; Red = top row team win.

==== Round of Four ====
| Rank | Team | Pld | W | D | L | Pts. | MP | Res. | SBFIDE |
|---|---|---|---|---|---|---|---|---|---|
| 1 | San Beda Red Cubs | 2 | 2 | 0 | 0 | – | – | – | – |
| 2 | Letran Squires | 2 | 2 | 0 | 0 | – | – | – | – |
| 3 | Arellano Braves | 2 | 0 | 0 | 2 | – | – | – | – |
| 4 | Lyceum Junior Pirates | 2 | 0 | 0 | 2 | – | – | – | – |

Match-up results

| Team ╲ Game | 1 | 2 | 3 |
|---|---|---|---|
| AU | Letran school colors | San Beda school colors | Lyceum school colors |
| CSJL | Arellano school colors | Lyceum school colors | San Beda school colors |
| LPU | San Beda school colors | Letran school colors | Arellano school colors |
| SBC–R | Lyceum school colors | Arellano school colors | Letran school colors |

= Win; = Draw; = Loss

===== Scores =====
| Team | AU | CSJL | LPU | SBC-R |
|---|---|---|---|---|
| AU | | .5–3.5 | – | 1.5–2.5 |
| CSJL | | | 3.5–.5 | – |
| LPU | | | | 1.5–2.5 |
| SBC-R | | | | |

Legend: Blue = left column team win; Yellow = draw; Red = top row team win.

== Badminton ==
The badminton tournament of NCAA Season 92 started on August 31, 2016, at the Rizal Memorial Sports Complex badminton court in Malate, Manila.

=== Seniors tournament ===
==== Elimination round ====
| Rank | Team | W | L |
|---|---|---|---|
| 1 | Letran Knights | 8 | 0 |
| 2 | Lyceum Pirates | 7 | 1 |
| 3 | Benilde Blazers | 6 | 2 |
| 4 | San Beda Red Lions | 5 | 3 |
| 5 | Arellano Chiefs | 4 | 4 |
| 6 | **EAC Generals** | 3 | 5 |
| 7 | Mapúa Cardinals | 2 | 6 |
| 8 | Perpetual Altas | 1 | 7 |
| 9 | JRU Heavy Bombers | 0 | 8 |

Qualified to the Round of Four

Event host in **boldface**

Match-up results

| Team ╲ Game | 1 | 2 | 3 | 4 | 5 | 6 | 7 | 8 |
|---|---|---|---|---|---|---|---|---|
| AU | EAC school colors | Letran school colors | JRU school colors | CSB school colors | Mapua school colors | San Beda school colors | UPHD school colors | Lyceum school colors |
| CSJL | JRU school colors | Arellano school colors | Mapua school colors | San Beda school colors | UPHD school colors | Lyceum school colors | EAC school colors | CSB school colors |
| CSB | JRU school colors | UPHD school colors | Arellano school colors | Lyceum school colors | Mapua school colors | EAC school colors | San Beda school colors | Letran school colors |
| EAC | Arellano school colors | Mapua school colors | San Beda school colors | UPHD school colors | Lyceum school colors | CSB school colors | Letran school colors | JRU school colors |
| JRU | Letran school colors | CSB school colors | Arellano school colors | Mapua school colors | San Beda school colors | UPHD school colors | Lyceum school colors | EAC school colors |
| LPU | Mapua school colors | San Beda school colors | Letran school colors | UPHD school colors | CSB school colors | EAC school colors | Letran school colors | JRU school colors |
| MIT | Lyceum school colors | EAC school colors | JRU school colors | Arellano school colors | CSB school colors | San Beda school colors | UPHD school colors | Arellano school colors |
| SBC | UPHD school colors | Lyceum school colors | EAC school colors | Letran school colors | JRU school colors | Arellano school colors | Mapua school colors | CSB school colors |
| UPHSD | San Beda school colors | CSB school colors | Lyceum school colors | EAC school colors | Letran school colors | JRU school colors | Arellano school colors | Mapua school colors |

= Win; = Loss

===== Scores =====
| Team | AU | CSJL | CSB | EAC | JRU | LPU | MIT | SBC | UPHSD |
|---|---|---|---|---|---|---|---|---|---|
| AU | | 0–3 | 1–2 | 2–1 | 3–0 | 1–2 | 2–1 | 1–2 | 3–0 |
| CSJL | | | 2–1 | 3–0 | 3–0 | 2–1 | 3–0 | 3–0 | 3–0 |
| CSB | | | | 3–0 | 3–0 | 1–2 | 2–1 | 3–0 | 3–0 |
| EAC | | | | | 2–1 | 1–2 | 2–1 | 0–3 | 2–1 |
| JRU | | | | | | 0–3 | 0–3 | 0–3 | 0–3 |
| LPU | | | | | | | 3–0 | 2–1 | 3–0 |
| MIT | | | | | | | | 0–3 | 0–3 |
| SBC | | | | | | | | | 3–0 |
| UPHSD | | | | | | | | | |

Legend: Blue = left column team win; Red = top row team win.

==== Round of Four ====
| Rank | Team | W | L |
|---|---|---|---|
| 1 | Letran Knights | 2 | 0 |
| 2 | San Beda Red Lions | 1 | 1 |
| 3 | Lyceum Pirates | 1 | 1 |
| 4 | Benilde Blazers | 0 | 2 |

Match-up results

| Team ╲ Game | 1 | 2 | 3 |
|---|---|---|---|
| CSJL | San Beda school colors | CSB school colors | Lyceum school colors |
| CSB | Lyceum school colors | Letran school colors | San Beda school colors |
| LPU | CSB school colors | San Beda school colors | Letran school colors |
| SBC | Letran school colors | Lyceum school colors | CSB school colors |

= Win; = Loss

===== Scores =====
| Team | CSJL | CSB | LPU | SBC |
|---|---|---|---|---|
| CSJL | | 2–1 | – | 2–1 |
| CSB | | | 0–3 | – |
| LPU | | | | 1–2 |
| SBC | | | | |

Legend: Blue = left column team win; Red = top row team win.

=== Women's tournament ===
==== Elimination round ====
| Rank | Team | W | L |
|---|---|---|---|
| 1 | Benilde Lady Blazers | 7 | 0 |
| 2 | Arellano Lady Chiefs | 6 | 1 |
| 3 | Lyceum Lady Pirates | 5 | 2 |
| 4 | Mapúa Lady Cardinals | 4 | 3 |
| 5 | San Beda Red Lionesses | 3 | 4 |
| 6 | Letran Lady Knights | 2 | 5 |
| 7 | **EAC Lady Generals** | 1 | 5 |
| 8 | Perpetual Lady Altas | 0 | 7 |

Qualified to the Round of Four Event host in **boldface**

Match-up results

| Team ╲ Game | 1 | 2 | 3 | 4 | 5 | 6 | 7 |
|---|---|---|---|---|---|---|---|
| AU | EAC school colors | Letran school colors | Lyceum school colors | UPHD school colors | San Beda school colors | Mapua school colors | CSB school colors |
| CSJL | Mapua school colors | Arellano school colors | EAC school colors | CSB school colors | Lyceum school colors | UPHD school colors | San Beda school colors |
| CSB | UPHD school colors | EAC school colors | San Beda school colors | Letran school colors | Mapua school colors | Lyceum school colors | Arellano school colors |
| EAC | Arellano school colors | CSB school colors | Letran school colors | Lyceum school colors | UPHD school colors | San Beda school colors | Mapua school colors |
| LPU | San Beda school colors | Mapua school colors | Arellano school colors | EAC school colors | Letran school colors | CSB school colors | UPHD school colors |
| MIT | Letran school colors | Lyceum school colors | UPHD school colors | San Beda school colors | CSB school colors | Arellano school colors | EAC school colors |
| SBC | Lyceum school colors | UPHD school colors | CSB school colors | Mapua school colors | Arellano school colors | EAC school colors | Letran school colors |
| UPHSD | CSB school colors | San Beda school colors | Mapua school colors | Arellano school colors | EAC school colors | Letran school colors | Lyceum school colors |

= Win; = Loss

===== Scores =====
| Team | AU | CSJL | CSB | EAC | LPU | MIT | SBC | UPHSD |
|---|---|---|---|---|---|---|---|---|
| AU | | 3–0 | 0–3 | 3–0 | 3–0 | 3–0 | 2–1 | 3–0 |
| CSJL | | | 0–3 | 3–0 | 0–3 | 1–2 | 1–2 | 2–1 |
| CSB | | | | 3–0 | 2–1 | 3–0 | 3–0 | 3–0 |
| EAC | | | | | 0–3 | 1–2 | 0–3 | 2–1 |
| LPU | | | | | | 3–0 | 2–1 | 3–0 |
| MIT | | | | | | | 2–1 | 3–0 |
| SBC | | | | | | | | 2–1 |
| UPHSD | | | | | | | | |

Legend: Blue = left column team win; Red = top row team win.

==== Round of Four ====
| Rank | Team | W | L |
|---|---|---|---|
| 1 | Benilde Lady Blazers | 2 | 0 |
| 2 | Mapúa Lady Cardinals | 1 | 1 |
| 3 | Arellano Lady Chiefs | 1 | 1 |
| 4 | Lyceum Lady Pirates | 0 | 2 |

Match-up results

| Team ╲ Game | 1 | 2 | 3 |
|---|---|---|---|
| AU | Lyceum school colors | Mapua school colors | CSB school colors |
| CSB | Mapua school colors | Lyceum school colors | San Beda school colors |
| LPU | Arellano school colors | CSB school colors | Mapua school colors |
| MIT | CSB school colors | Arellano school colors | Lyceum school colors |

= Win; = Loss

===== Scores =====
| Team | AU | CSB | LPU | MIT |
|---|---|---|---|---|
| AU | | – | 2–1 | 0–3 |
| CSB | | | 2–1 | 3–0 |
| LPU | | | | – |
| MIT | | | | |

Legend: Blue = left column team win; Red = top row team win.

=== Juniors tournament ===
==== Elimination round ====
| Rank | Team | W | L |
|---|---|---|---|
| 1 | Letran Squires | 8 | 0 |
| 2 | La Salle Green Hills Greenies | 7 | 1 |
| 3 | San Beda Red Cubs | 6 | 2 |
| 4 | San Sebastian Staglets | 5 | 3 |
| 5 | Arellano Braves | 4 | 4 |
| 6 | **EAC–ICA Brigadiers** | 3 | 5 |
| 7 | Lyceum Junior Pirates | 2 | 6 |
| 8 | JRU Light Bombers | 1 | 7 |
| 9 | Mapúa Red Robins | 0 | 8 |

Qualified to the Round of Four

Event host in **boldface**

Match-up results

| Team ╲ Game | 1 | 2 | 3 | 4 | 5 | 6 | 7 | 8 |
|---|---|---|---|---|---|---|---|---|
| AU | EAC school colors | Lyceum school colors | Mapua school colors | CSB school colors | Letran school colors | San Beda school colors | SSC-R school colors | JRU school colors |
| CSJL | JRU school colors | EAC school colors | Lyceum school colors | Mapua school colors | Arellano school colors | CSB school colors | San Beda school colors | SSC-R school colors |
| LSGH | SSC-R school colors | Mapua school colors | JRU school colors | Arellano school colors | EAC school colors | Letran school colors | Lyceum school colors | San Beda school colors |
| EAC–ICA | Arellano school colors | Letran school colors | San Beda school colors | SSC-R school colors | JRU school colors | CSB school colors | Lyceum school colors | Mapua school colors |
| JRU | Letran school colors | San Beda school colors | SSC-R school colors | CSB school colors | EAC school colors | Lyceum school colors | Mapua school colors | Arellano school colors |
| LPU | Mapua school colors | Arellano school colors | Letran school colors | San Beda school colors | SSC-R school colors | JRU school colors | EAC school colors | CSB school colors |
| MHSS | Lyceum school colors | CSB school colors | Arellano school colors | Letran school colors | San Beda school colors | SSC-R school colors | JRU school colors | EAC school colors |
| SBC–R | SSC-R school colors | JRU school colors | EAC school colors | Lyceum school colors | Mapua school colors | Arellano school colors | Letran school colors | CSB school colors |
| SSC–R | San Beda school colors | CSB school colors | JRU school colors | EAC school colors | Lyceum school colors | Mapua school colors | Arellano school colors | Letran school colors |

= Win; = Loss

===== Scores =====
| Team | AU | CSJL | LSGH | EAC-ICA | JRU | LPU | MHSS | SBC-R | SSC-R |
|---|---|---|---|---|---|---|---|---|---|
| AU | | 0–3 | 0–3 | 3–0 | 3–0 | 2–1 | 3–0 | 1–2 | 1–2 |
| CSJL | | | 2–1 | 3–0 | 3–0 | 3–0 | 3–0 | 3–0 | 3–0 |
| LSGH | | | | 3–0 | 3–0 | 3–0 | 3–0 | 2–1 | 3–0 |
| EAC-ICA | | | | | 2–1 | 2–1 | 3–0 | 0–3 | 1–2 |
| JRU | | | | | | 3–0 | 0–3 | 0–3 | 1–2 |
| LPU | | | | | | | 3–0 | 0–3 | 0–3 |
| MHSS | | | | | | | | 0–3 | 0–3 |
| SBC-R | | | | | | | | | 2–1 |
| SSC-R | | | | | | | | | |

Legend: Blue = left column team win; Red = top row team win.

==== Round of Four ====
| Rank | Team | W | L |
|---|---|---|---|
| 1 | Letran Squires | 2 | 0 |
| 2 | San Sebastian Staglets | 1 | 1 |
| 3 | La Salle Green Hills Greenies | 1 | 1 |
| 4 | San Beda Red Cubs | 0 | 2 |

Match-up results

| Team ╲ Game | 1 | 2 | 3 |
|---|---|---|---|
| CSJL | SSC-R school colors | San Beda school colors | CSB school colors |
| LSGH | San Beda school colors | SSC-R school colors | Letran school colors |
| SBC–R | CSB school colors | Letran school colors | SSC-R school colors |
| SSC–R | Letran school colors | CSB school colors | San Beda school colors |

= Win; = Loss

===== Scores =====
| Team | CSJL | LSGH | SBC-R | SSC-R |
|---|---|---|---|---|
| CSJL | | – | 2–1 | 3–0 |
| LSGH | | | 2–1 | 1–2 |
| SBC-R | | | | – |
| SSC-R | | | | |

Legend: Blue = left column team win; Red = top row team win.

== Swimming ==
The swimming events of Season 92 were held on September 9–11, 2016 at the Rizal Memorial Sports Complex.

=== Men's tournament ===
| # | Team | Total |
|---|---|---|
| 1st place, gold medalist(s) | San Beda Red Lions | 1,467 |
| 2nd place, silver medalist(s) | Benilde Blazers | 473.5 |
| 3rd place, bronze medalist(s) | Arellano Chiefs | 263 |
| 4 | San Sebastian Stags | 217.5 |
| 5 | EAC Admirals | 167 |
| 6 | Letran Knights | 150 |
| 7 | Perpetual Altas | 95 |
| 8 | **Mapúa Cardinals** | 85 |
| 9 | Lyceum Pirates | 37 |
| 10 | JRU Heavy Bombers | 10 |

Event host is boldfaced.

Most Valuable Player: Joshua Junsay
Rookie of the year: Luis Evangelista

=== Women's tournament ===
| # | Team | Total |
|---|---|---|
| 1st place, gold medalist(s) | San Beda Red Lionesses | 1,300 |
| 2nd place, silver medalist(s) | Benilde Lady Blazers | 811.5 |
| 3rd place, bronze medalist(s) | EAC Lady Generals | 221.5 |
| 4 | Arellano Lady Chiefs | 180.5 |
| 5 | Lyceum Lady Pirates | 154.5 |
| 6 | **Mapúa Lady Cardinals** | 108.5 |
| 7 | JRU Lady Bombers | 65.5 |
| 8 | Letran Lady Knights | 44 |
| 9 | San Sebastian Lady Stags | 15 |
| 10 | Perpetual Lady Altas | 8 |

Event host is boldfaced.

Most Valuable Player: Maria Aresa Lipat
Rookie of the year: Febbie Mae Porras

=== Juniors' tournament ===
| # | Team | Total |
|---|---|---|
| 1st place, gold medalist(s) | San Beda Red Cubs | 1,037.5 |
| 2nd place, silver medalist(s) | La Salle Green Hills Greenies | 948.5 |
| 3rd place, bronze medalist(s) | Arellano Braves | 286 |
| 4 | Letran Squires | 187 |
| 5 | Lyceum Junior Pirates | 146.5 |
| 6 | EAC–ICA Brigadiers | 146 |
| 7 | JRU Light Bombers | 130 |
| 8 | Perpetual Junior Altas | 74 |
| 9 | San Sebastian Staglets | 22 |
| 10 | **Mapúa Red Robins** | 15 |

Event host is boldfaced.

Most Valuable Player: Miguel Karlo Barlisan
Rookie of the year: John Soriano

== Table Tennis ==
The Table Tennis tournament of NCAA Season 92 started on September 18 until October 2 at the Letran Gym in Intramuros, Manila.

=== Seniors' Tournament ===
==== Elimination round ====
| Rank | Team | W | L | Points |
|---|---|---|---|---|
| 1 | Benilde Blazers | 9 | 0 | 18 |
| 2 | **Letran Knights** | 8 | 1 | 17 |
| 3 | Perpetual Altas | 7 | 2 | 16 |
| 4 | Arellano Chiefs | 4 | 5 | 13 |
| 5 | San Beda Red Lions | 4 | 5 | 13 |
| 6 | Lyceum Pirates | 4 | 4 | 13 |
| 7 | Mapúa Cardinals | 3 | 6 | 12 |
| 8 | JRU Heavy Bombers | 3 | 6 | 12 |
| 9 | EAC Generals | 2 | 7 | 10 |
| 10 | San Sebastian Stags | 1 | 8 | 10 |

Qualified to the Round of Four

Event host in **boldface**

==== Round of Four ====
| Rank | Team | W | L | Rd. 2 Points | Total Points |
|---|---|---|---|---|---|
| 1 | Benilde Blazers | 3 | 0 | 6 | **24** |
| 2 | **Letran Knights** | 1 | 2 | 4 | **21** |
| 3 | Perpetual Altas | 1 | 2 | 4 | **20** |
| 4 | Arellano Chiefs | 1 | 2 | 4 | **17** |

Event host in **boldface**

=== Women's tournament ===
==== Elimination round ====
| Rank | Team | W | L | Points |
|---|---|---|---|---|
| 1 | San Beda Red Lionesses | 8 | 0 | 16 |
| 2 | Benilde Lady Blazers | 7 | 1 | 15 |
| 3 | EAC Lady Generals | 5 | 3 | 13 |
| 4 | Arellano Lady Chiefs | 5 | 3 | 13 |
| 5 | Lyceum Lady Pirates | 4 | 4 | 12 |
| 6 | **Letran Lady Knights** | 4 | 4 | 12 |
| 7 | San Sebastian Lady Stags | 2 | 6 | 10 |
| 8 | JRU Lady Bombers | 1 | 7 | 9 |

Qualified to the Round of Four

Event host in **boldface**

==== Round of Four ====
| Rank | Team | W | L | Rd. 2 Points | Total Points |
|---|---|---|---|---|---|
| 1 | San Beda Red Lionesses | 3 | 0 | 6 | **22** |
| 2 | EAC Lady Generals | 2 | 1 | 5 | **18** |
| 3 | Benilde Lady Blazers | 1 | 2 | 4 | **19** |
| 4 | Arellano Lady Chiefs | 0 | 3 | 3 | **16** |

=== Juniors' Tournament ===
==== Elimination round ====
| Rank | Team | W | L | Points |
|---|---|---|---|---|
| 1 | Arellano Braves | 9 | 0 | 18 |
| 2 | San Beda Red Cubs | 8 | 1 | 17 |
| 3 | **Letran Squires** | 7 | 2 | 16 |
| 4 | San Sebastian Staglets | 5 | 4 | 14 |
| 5 | EAC–ICA Brigadiers | 4 | 5 | 13 |
| 6 | Perpetual Junior Altas | 4 | 5 | 13 |
| 7 | Lyceum Junior Pirates | 4 | 5 | 12 |
| 8 | JRU Light Bombers | 2 | 7 | 11 |
| 8 | La Salle Green Hills Greenies | 2 | 7 | 11 |
| 8 | Mapúa Red Robins | 0 | 9 | 9 |

Qualified to the Round of Four

Event host in **boldface**

==== Round of Four ====
| Rank | Team | W | L | Rd. 2 Points | Total Points |
|---|---|---|---|---|---|
| 1 | Arellano Braves | 2 | 1 | 5 | **23+2** |
| 2 | San Beda Red Cubs | 2 | 1 | 5 | **22+1** |
| 3 | **Letran Squires** | 2 | 1 | 5 | **21** |
| 4 | San Sebastian Staglets | 0 | 3 | 3 | **17** |

Event host in **boldface**

== Taekwondo ==
The Taekwondo tournament of NCAA Season 92 started on October 14 until October 16 at the Letran Gym in Intramuros, Manila.

== General championship summary ==
The current point system gives 50 points to the champion team in a certain NCAA event, 40 to the runner-up, and 35 to the third placer. The following points are given in consequent order of finish: 30, 25, 20, 15, 10, 8 and 6.

| Pts. | Position |
|---|---|
| 50 | Champion |
| 40 | 2nd |
| 35 | 3rd |
| 30 | 4th |
| 25 | 5th |
| 20 | 6th |
| 15 | 7th |
| 10 | 8th |
| 8 | 9th |
| 6 | 10th |
| 0 | Did not join |
| WD | Withdrew |

=== Seniors' division championships ===
==== Medal table ====
| Rank | Team | Gold | Silver | Bronze | Total |
|---|---|---|---|---|---|
| 1st place, gold medalist(s) | San Beda Red Lions | 8 | 1 | 4 | 13 |
| 2nd place, silver medalist(s) | Benilde Blazers | 4 | 7 | 3 | 14 |
| 3rd place, bronze medalist(s) | Arellano Chiefs | 2 | 2 | 2 | 6 |
| 4 | Perpetual Altas | 1 | 2 | 1 | 4 |
| 5 | San Sebastian Stags | 1 | 2 | 0 | 3 |
| 6 | Letran Knights | 1 | 1 | 0 | 2 |
| 7 | Lyceum Pirates | 0 | 2 | 1 | 3 |
| 8 | Mapúa Cardinals | 0 | 1 | 1 | 2 |
| 9 | EAC Generals | 0 | 0 | 1 | 1 |
| 10 | JRU Heavy Bombers | 0 | 0 | 0 | 0 |
| Total | | 17 | 17 | 17 | 41 |

==== Overall championship tally ====
| Rank | School | Basketball | Chess | Men's Swimming | Women's Swimming | Men's Taekwondo | Women's Taekwondo | Men's Badminton | Men's Badminton | Men's table tennis | Women's table tennis | Men's Volleyball | Women's volleyball | Football | Lawn tennis | Soft tennis | Men's beach volleyball | Women's beach volleyball | Track and field | Pts. |
|---|---|---|---|---|---|---|---|---|---|---|---|---|---|---|---|---|---|---|---|---|
| 1st place, gold medalist(s) | San Beda | 50 | 50 | 50 | 50 | 50 | 35 | 35 | 20 | 22.5 | 50 | 35 | 30 | 50 | 35 | 50 | 22.5 | 40 | 8 | 683.0 |
| 2nd place, silver medalist(s) | Benilde | 6 | 30 | 40 | 40 | 40 | 50 | 40 | 40 | 50 | 40 | 50 | 35 | 40 | 50 | 35 | 26 | | 35 | 647.0 |
| 3rd place, bronze medalist(s) | Arellano | 40 | 40 | 35 | 30 | 55 | | 30 | 35 | 30 | 30 | 30 | 50 | 35 | 20 | 25 | 45 | | 50 | 590.0 |
| 4 | Lyceum | 8 | 35 | 8 | 25 | 75 | | 40 | 30 | 45 | | 20 | 22.5 | 30 | 12.5 | 15 | 40 | 22.5 | 15 | 444.5 |
| 5 | Perpetual | 30 | 8 | 15 | 6 | 4 | 4 | 10 | 10 | 35 | | 40 | 22.5 | 25 | 25 | 40 | 50 | 35 | 25 | 384.5 |
| 6 | Letran | 22.5 | 25 | 20 | 10 | 20 | 20 | 50 | 20 | 40 | 22.5 | 10 | 10 | — | 30 | 20 | 17 | | 30 | 367.0 |
| 7 | Mapúa | 35 | 25 | 10 | 20 | 20 | | 45 | | 23 | | 25 | 6 | 12.5 | 7 | — | 38 | | 40 | 301.5 |
| 8 | San Sebastian | 15 | 10 | 30 | 8 | 50 | | — | | 21 | | 15 | 40 | — | 40 | — | 11 | 50 | 10 | 300.0 |
| 9 | EAC | 10 | 6 | 25 | 35 | 35 | | 20 | 15 | 43 | | 15 | | 12.5 | 12.5 | 20 | 45 | | 6 | 299.0 |
| 10 | JRU | 22.5 | 15 | 6 | 15 | — | | — | | 20 | | 6 | 7 | — | 7 | — | 36 | | 30 | 172.5 |

- Demonstration sports like men's soft tennis, women's lawn tennis, women's badminton, and cheerleading are not included in the overall championship tally, but it is included in the medal table.

=== Juniors' division championships ===
==== Medal table ====
| Rank | Team | Gold | Silver | Bronze | Total |
|---|---|---|---|---|---|
| 1 | San Beda Red Cubs | 1 | 2 | 0 | 3 |
| 2 | Letran Squires | 1 | 0 | 0 | 1 |
| 3 | Mapúa Red Robins | 1 | 0 | 0 | 1 |
| 4 | La Salle Green Hills Greenies | 0 | 1 | 1 | 2 |
| 5 | Arellano Braves | 0 | 0 | 1 | 1 |
| 6 | EAC–ICA Brigadiers | 0 | 0 | 0 | 0 |
| 7 | San Sebastian Staglets | 0 | 0 | 0 | 0 |
| 8 | Perpetual Junior Altas | 0 | 0 | 0 | 0 |
| 9 | Lyceum Junior Pirates | 0 | 0 | 0 | 0 |
| 10 | JRU Light Bombers | 0 | 0 | 0 | 0 |
| Total | | 3 | 3 | 2 | 8 |

==== Overall championship tally ====
| Rank | School | Basketball | Chess | Men's Swimming | Men's Taekwondo | Men's Badminton | Men's table tennis | Men's Volleyball | Football | Lawn tennis | Men's beach volleyball | Track and field | Pts. |
|---|---|---|---|---|---|---|---|---|---|---|---|---|---|
| 1 | San Beda | 40 | 40 | 50 | | | | | 50 | | | | 130.0 |
| 2 | Letran | 20 | 50 | 30 | | | | | | | | | 100.0 |
| 3 | LSGH | 35 | | 40 | | | | | | | | | 75.0 |
| 4 | Arellano | 30 | | 35 | | | | | | | | | 65.0 |
| 5 | Malayan | 50 | | 6 | | | | | | | | | 56.0 |
| 6 | Lyceum | 25 | | 25 | | | | | | | | | 50.0 |
| 7 | EAC–ICA | 8 | | 20 | | | | | | | | | 28.0 |
| 8 | JRU | 10 | | 15 | | | | | | | | | 25.0 |
| 9 | Perpetual | 15 | | 10 | | | | | | | | | 25.0 |
| 10 | San Sebastian | 6 | | 8 | | | | | | | | | 14.0 |

== Broadcast coverage ==
Play-by-play:

- Andrei Felix
- Martin Javier
- Anton Roxas

Analysts (basketball)

- Martin Antonio
- Migs Bustos
- Mikee Reyes
- Olsen Racela
- Renren Ritualo

Analysts (Volleyball)

- Denden Lazaro
- Michele Gumabao
- Carmela Tunay

Courtside reporters:

- Sarah Carlos
- Roxanne Montealegre
- Ceej Tantengco

=== Previous courtside reporter of NCAA ===
- Brandy Kramer
- Eric Tipan
- Myrtle Sarrosa

== See also ==
- UAAP Season 79
