= NCAA Season 84 =

Filipino collegiate athletic season

- Host school: Mapúa Institute of Technology
- Tagline: "To the Fore at 84: Building Bridges Through Sports"

General
- Seniors: Benilde Blazers
- Juniors: La Salle Green Hills Greenies

Seniors' champions
Sport		Men	Women
Basketball		San Beda	N/A
Volleyball		Letran	San Sebastian
Chess		Benilde	
Taekwondo		Benilde	
Table tennis		Benilde	Benilde
Swimming		San Beda	N/A
Beach Volleyball		Letran	San Sebastian
Track and field		Mapúa	N/A
Football		San Beda	N/A
Lawn Tennis		Letran	N/A
- Cheerdance: JRU (EX) (Ex - Coed)

Juniors' champions
Sport		Boys	Girls
Basketball		SSC–R	N/A
Volleyball		SSC–R	
Chess		Letran	
Taekwondo		LSGH	
Table tennis		San Beda	
Swimming		LSGH	
Beach Volleyball		San Sebastian Staglets	
Track and field		LSGH	
Football		LSGH	
Lawn Tennis		LSGH	
- (NT) = No tournament; (DS) = Demonstration Sport; (Ex) = Exhibition;

NCAA Season 84 is the 2008–09 season of the National Collegiate Athletic Association (NCAA) of the Philippines.

Mapua Institute of Technology is the host of the 2008–2009 season, with the year's theme being "To The Fore at 84: Building Bridges Through Sports". NCAA Season 81's commissioner Joe Lipa returns as a commissioner.

== Unresolved issues from Season 83 ==
=== PCU suspension ===
After being suspended the previous season for identity switching, an additional five student-athletes were implicated by the NCAA's own investigation to the matter. Initially, it was thought that the Management Committee (MANCOM) would extend PCU's suspension for another year.

On May 28, the Policy Board and the PCU management announced an agreement in which the PCU Dolphins seniors' teams would return to the league for Season 84, with the juniors' teams still suspended; after the season, the school would take an indefinite leave of absence from the league. As a result, the Policy Board scrapped the MANCOM's earlier recommendation of extending the suspension for another year with three years of probation thereafter. Several players were also banned from the league, with the exception of Elvin Pascual who is currently at the San Beda Red Lions' team B; his status would be decided on the eligibility meeting on June 10. Pascual was cleared to play by the MANCOM after an appeal was granted on a previous decision that barred him from playing.

=== Game-fixing allegations ===
Another issue being investigated by the MANCOM were the allegations of game-fixing on games, especially after Paolo Orbeta of CSB was implicated on point shaving. Incoming president Dr. Reynaldo Vea of Season 84 host Mapua and his predecessor Dr. Vince Fabella of Jose Rizal issued a stern warning on the matter.

=== Return of the Mapua juniors team ===
The Mapua juniors team returns with student-athletes from the Malayan High School of Science; the original Mapua Institute of Technology Pre-Engineering High School closed down after the Yuchengco takeover of the institute. The school was "forced" to form the team for them to be able to host the season since they will not be allowed to take part in seniors' events, which would jeopardize their hosting duties. The basketball team would be handled by former Mapua Cardinals Randy Alcantara and Chito Victolero. The old Mapua juniors team held the most basketball championships, with 18.

=== PBA Draft rules ===
After Yousif Aljamal's suspension the previous season that led into court intervention, the league clarified its rules on application to the Philippine Basketball Association (PBA) Draft; the applicant must formally inform the league on their intentions to apply. Also the league implemented another rule restricting a member school from fielding more than two imports at the same time to level the playing field following the entry of foreign players.

== Basketball ==
=== Seniors' tournament ===
==== Elimination round ====
Pos	Team	W	L	PCT	GB	Qualification
1	San Beda Red Lions (Note: San Beda forfeited their first round win against Benilde when one of their players wore the wrong uniform.)	11	3	.786	—	Twice-to-beat in the semifinals
2	JRU Heavy Bombers	9	5	.643 (Note: Head-to-head record: San Sebastian 4–2, Mapúa 3–3, Letran 3–3 (Mapúa 1–1 Letran, Mapúa +10), JRU 2–4; classification playoffs: JRU 57–53, Letran 62–52 Mapúa, fourth-seed playoff: Mapúa 63–54 San Sebastian; second-seed playoff: JRU 69–53 Letran)	2	Twice-to-beat in the semifinals
3	Letran Knights	9	5	.643	2	Twice-to-win in the semifinals
4	Mapúa Cardinals (H)	9	5	.643	2	Twice-to-win in the semifinals
5	San Sebastian Stags	9	5	.643	2	
6	Benilde Blazers	4	10	.286	7	
7	PCU Dolphins	3	11	.214	8	
8	Perpetual Altas	2	12	.143	9	

Source: ABS-CBN Sports
Rules for classification: 1) winning percentage; 2) if tied for top 4, one-game playoff; 3) head-to-head record; 4) head-to-head goal average; 5) overall point differential
(H) Hosts

==== Bracket ====
Semifinals (Top 2 twice-to-beat)
1	San Beda	51	60
4	Mapúa	53	53
2	JRU	63
3	Letran	61

Finals (Best-of-three playoff)
1	San Beda	72	60	85
2	JRU	68	62	69

=== Juniors' tournament ===
==== Elimination round ====
Pos	Team	W	L	PCT	GB	Qualification
1	San Sebastian Staglets	12	0	1.000	—	Advance to the Finals (Note: As San Sebastian won all of their elimination round games, the stepladder format will be used instead of the regular Final Four format.)
2	Letran Squires	9	3	.750	3	Proceed to stepladder round 2
3	JRU Light Bombers	7	5	.583 (Note: Head-to-head record: JRU 1–1 (+24) LSGH)	5	Proceed to stepladder round 1
4	La Salle Green Hills Greenies	7	5	.583	5	Proceed to stepladder round 1
5	San Beda Red Cubs	5	7	.417	7	
6	Perpetual Altalettes	2	10	.167	10	
7	Mapúa Red Robins (H)	0	12	.000	12	

Source: ABS-CBN Sports
Rules for classification: 1) winning percentage; 2) if tied for top 4, one-game playoff; 3) head-to-head record; 4) head-to-head point differential; 5) overall point differential
(H) Hosts

==== Bracket ====
Stepladder round 1 (Single-elimination)
3	JRU	95*
4	LSGH	89

Stepladder round 2 (Single-elimination)
2	Letran	94
3	JRU	93

Finals (Best-of-three playoff)
1	San Sebastian	83	77
2	Letran	81	70

*Overtime

== Volleyball ==
Host team in boldface.

=== Men's tournament ===
1. Letran Knights
2. San Beda Red Lions
3. Benilde Blazers
4. Perpetual Altas
5. San Sebastian Stags
6. PCU Dolphins
7. **JRU Heavy Bombers**

=== Women's tournament ===
1. San Sebastian Lady Stags
2. Benilde Lady Blazers
3. Perpetual Lady Altas
4. Letran Lady Knights
5. San Beda Red Lionesses
6. PCU Lady Dolphins
7. **JRU Lady Bombers**

=== Juniors' tournament ===
1. San Sebastian Staglets
2. Perpetual Junior Altas
3. La Salle Green Hills Greenies
4. Letran Squires
5. San Beda Red Cubs

== Soccer ==
Host team in boldface.

=== Seniors' tournament ===
1. San Beda Red Lions
2. PCU Dolphins
3. Benilde Blazers
4. Mapúa Cardinals

=== Juniors' tournament ===
1. La Salle Green Hills Greenies
2. San Beda Red Cubs
3. Perpetual Junior Altas
4. Mapúa Red Robins
5. Letran Squires

== Beach Volleyball ==
=== Men's final ===
February 25 – La Salle Green Hills sand court, Mandaluyong
Team	Sets
**Letran**	**def.**
PCU	

=== Women's final ===
February 25 – La Salle Green Hills sand court, Mandaluyong
Team	1	2	Sets
San Sebastian	**24**	**21**	**2**
Benilde	22	15	**0**

=== Juniors' final ===
February 25 – La Salle Green Hills sand court, Mandaluyong
Team	1	2	Sets
San Sebastian	**21**	**21**	**2**
Letran	16	10	**0**

== Chess ==
=== Seniors' tournament ===
==== Elimination round ====
Team	Points
Letran Knights	31.5
Mapua Cardinals	28.5
San Sebastian Stags	28.0
St. Benilde Blazers	26.5
San Beda Red Lions	14.0
UPHD Altas	10.0
JRU Heavy Bombers	5.5

=== Juniors' tournament ===
==== Elimination round ====
Team	Points
Letran Squires	10.5
San Sebastian Staglets	10.5
LSGH Greenies	7.5
UPHD Altalettes	0
JRU Light Bombers	0
San Beda Red Cubs	0
Mapua Red Robins	0

== Taekwondo ==
Host team in boldface.

=== Seniors' tournament ===
1. Benilde Blazers
2. San Beda Red Lions
3. San Sebastian Stags
4. Letran Knights
5. PCU Dolphins
6. Perpetual Altas

=== Juniors' tournament ===
1. La Salle Green Hills Greenies
2. Letran Squires
3. San Sebastian Staglets
4. Perpetual Junior Altas
5. San Beda Red Cubs

== Lawn tennis ==
Host team in boldface.

=== Seniors' tournament ===
1. Letran Knights
2. Benilde Blazers
3. San Beda Red Lions
4. San Sebastian Stags
5. Perpetual Altas
6. PCU Dolphins
7. **JRU Heavy Bombers**
8. Mapúa Cardinals

=== Juniors' tournament ===
1. La Salle Green Hills Greenies
2. San Beda Red Cubs
3. Letran Squires
4. San Sebastian Staglets
5. Perpetual Junior Altas
6. **JRU Light Bombers**
7. Mapúa Red Robins

== Table tennis ==
Host team in boldface.

=== Men's tournament ===
1. Benilde Blazers
2. Letran Knights
3. San Beda Red Lions
4. Perpetual Altas
5. San Sebastian Stags
6. Mapúa Cardinals
7. **JRU Heavy Bombers**
8. PCU Dolphins

=== Women's tournament ===
1. Benilde Lady Blazers
2. San Beda Red Lionesses
3. Letran Lady Knights
4. PCU Lady Dolphins
5. San Sebastian Lady Stags
6. **JRU Lady Bombers**

=== Juniors' tournament ===
1. San Beda Red Cubs
2. Letran Squires
3. San Sebastian Staglets
4. La Salle Green Hills Greenies
5. Perpetual Junior Altas
6. Mapúa Red Robins
7. **JRU Light Bombers**

== Swimming ==
Host team in boldface.

=== Seniors' tournament ===
1. San Beda Red Lions
2. PCU Dolphins
3. Benilde Blazers
4. Mapúa Cardinals
5. San Sebastian Stags

=== Juniors' tournament ===
1. La Salle Green Hills Greenies
2. San Sebastian Staglets
3. Perpetual Junior Altas
4. San Beda Red Cubs

== Track and field ==
Host team in boldface.

=== Seniors' tournament ===
1. Mapúa Cardinals
2. San Sebastian Stags
3. Letran Knights
4. Benilde Blazers
5. **JRU Heavy Bombers**
6. Perpetual Altas
7. PCU Dolphins
8. San Beda Red Lions

=== Juniors' tournament ===
1. La Salle Green Hills Greenies
2. San Sebastian Staglets
3. Letran Squires
4. Perpetual Junior Altas
5. **JRU Light Bombers**
6. Mapúa Red Robins
7. San Beda Red Cubs

== General Championship race ==
Pts.	Position
40	Champion
30	2nd
25	3rd
20	4th
10	5th
8	6th
6	7th
5	8th

=== Seniors' Division ===
#	School	Basketball	Men's Volleyball	Women's volleyball	Chess	Swimming	Football	Men's table tennis	Women's table tennis	Lawn tennis	Men's beach volleyball	Women's beach volleyball	Taekwondo	Track and field	Points
1	Benilde	8	25	30	40	30	25	40	40	30	10	30	40	20	368
2	San Beda	40	30	10	10	40	40	25	30	25	25	8	30	5	318
3	Letran	25	40	20	25	--	--	30	25	40	40	25	20	25	315
4	San Sebastian	10	10	40	20	10	--	10	10	20	6	40	25	30	231
5	PCU	6	8	8	--	25	30	5	20	8	30	10	10	6	166
6	Perpetual	5	20	25	8	--	--	20	--	10	20	20	8	8	144
7	**Mapúa**	20	--	--	30	20	20	8	--	5	--	--	--	40	143
8	JRU	30	6	6	6	--	--	6	8	6	8	6	--	10	92

=== Juniors' Division ===
#	School	Basketball	Volleyball	Chess	Swimming	Football	Table tennis	Lawn tennis	Taekwondo	Track and field	Points
1	LSGH	20	25	25	40	40	20	40	40	40	290
2	San Sebastian	40	40	30	30	--	25	20	25	30	240
3	Letran	30	20	40	--	10	30	25	30	25	210
4	Perpetual	8	30	20	25	25	10	10	20	20	168
5	San Beda	10	10	10	20	30	40	30	10	6	156
6	**Malayan Science**	6	--	8	--	20	8	6	--	8	56
7	JRU	25	--	6	--	--	6	8	--	10	55

== See also ==
- UAAP Season 71
