= NCAA Season 90 =

- Host school: Jose Rizal University
- Tagline: "Today's Heroes, Tomorrow's Legends. NCAA@90: We Make History."

General
- Seniors: Benilde Blazers
- Juniors: San Beda Red Cubs

Seniors' champions
Sport		Men	Women
Basketball		San Beda	N/A
Volleyball		EAC	Arellano
Chess		Arellano	
Taekwondo		San Beda	San Beda
Table Tennis		Benilde	San Beda
Lawn Tennis		Letran	
Soft Tennis		San Beda	San Beda
Swimming		San Beda	San Beda
Beach Volleyball		Benilde	San Sebastian
Track and field		JRU	
Badminton		Letran	Benilde
- Cheerdance: Arellano (Ex - Coed)

Juniors' champions
Sport		Boys	Girls
Basketball		San Beda	N/A
Volleyball		Perpetual	
Chess		Letran	
Taekwondo		SSC–R	
Table Tennis		San Beda	
Lawn Tennis		San Beda	
Swimming		LSGH	
Beach Volleyball		EAC–ICA	
Track and field		EAC–ICA	
Football		LSGH	
Badminton		LSGH	
- (NT) = No tournament; (DS) = Demonstration Sport; (Ex) = Exhibition;

NCAA Season 90 was the 2014–15 collegiate athletic year of the National Collegiate Athletic Association (NCAA) in the Philippines. It was hosted by the Jose Rizal University and was opened on June 28, 2014, at the Mall of Asia Arena in Pasay.

It was the last season for the Lyceum Pirates who played their second year as probationary and the EAC Generals who played their fifth year as probationary, as probationary members. Their performance in the Season 90 was the basis for the decision if they were to be admitted as regular members of the league.

This was the last season that Sports5 covered. Starting Season 91, the NCAA returned to ABS-CBN Sports, its former broadcaster from 2002 to 2011.

== Basketball ==
Basketball tournaments were officially opened on June 28, 2014 at the Mall of Asia Arena. Proceeding games are expected to be held at the San Juan Arena.

=== Seniors' tournament ===
==== Elimination round ====
Pos	Team	W	L	PCT	GB	Qualification
1	San Beda Red Lions	13	5	.722 (Note: First-seed playoff: San Beda 97–69 Arellano)	—	Twice-to-beat in the semifinals
2	Arellano Chiefs	13	5	.722	—	Twice-to-beat in the semifinals
3	JRU Heavy Bombers (H)	12	6	.667 (Note: Third-seed playoff: JRU 82–79 UPHSD)	1	Twice-to-win in the semifinals
4	Perpetual Altas	12	6	.667	1	Twice-to-win in the semifinals
5	Benilde Blazers	11	7	.611	2	
6	Letran Knights	9	9	.500	4	
7	Lyceum Pirates (X)	7	11	.389	6	
8	San Sebastian Stags	5	13	.278	8	
9	EAC Generals (X)	4	14	.222 (Note: Head-to-head record: EAC 2–0 Mapúa)	9	
10	Mapúa Cardinals	4	14	.222	9	

Source: ABS-CBN Sports
Rules for classification: 1) winning percentage; 2) if tied for top 4 seeds, or for #4 seed, one-game playoff; 3) head-to-head record]]; 4) overall point differential
(H) Hosts; (X) Under probation

==== Playoffs ====
During this, this finals was the first time Arellano made it to the finals and San Beda's ninth straight finals appearance and won their fifth straight championship

Semifinals (Nos. 1 & 2 have twice-to-beat advantage)
1	San Beda	81
4	Perpetual	75
2	Arellano	72
3	JRU	65

Finals (Best-of-three series)
1	San Beda	74	89
2	Arellano	65	70

=== Juniors' tournament ===
==== Elimination round ====
Pos	Team	W	L	PCT	GB	Qualification
1	Mapúa Red Robins	15	3	.833 (Note: First-seed playoff: Mapúa 87–78 San Beda)	—	Twice-to-beat in the semifinals
2	San Beda Red Cubs	15	3	.833	—	Twice-to-beat in the semifinals
3	Letran Squires	13	5	.722	2	Twice-to-win in the semifinals
4	JRU Light Bombers (H)	12	6	.667	3	Twice-to-win in the semifinals
5	La Salle Green Hills Greenies	10	8	.556 (Note: Head-to-head record: LSGH 2–0 San Sebastian)	5	
6	San Sebastian Staglets	10	8	.556	5	
7	Arellano Braves	6	12	.333	9	
8	Lyceum Junior Pirates (X)	4	14	.222 (Note: Head-to-head record: Lyceum 1–1 UPHSD (Lyceum +3))	11	
9	Perpetual Junior Altas	4	14	.222	11	
10	EAC–ICA Brigadiers (X)	1	17	.056	14	

Source: ABS-CBN Sports
Rules for classification: 1) winning percentage; 2) if tied for top 4 seeds, or for #4 seed, one-game playoff; 3) head-to-head record; 4) overall point differential
(H) Hosts; (X) Under probation

==== Playoffs ====
Semifinals (Nos. 1 & 2 have twice-to-beat advantage)
1	Malayan	76
4	JRU	68
2	San Beda–Rizal	70
3	Letran	64

Finals (Best-of-three series)
1	Malayan	84	68	65
2	San Beda–Rizal	75	78	78*

== Volleyball ==
The volleyball events of the NCAA Season 90 was open at the Mall of Asia Arena with the first five games. The games are all women's division.

== Swimming ==
The swimming events of Season 90 were held on August 20–22, 2014 at the Rizal Memorial Sports Complex.

=== Men's tournament ===
#	Team	Total
1st place, gold medalist(s)	San Beda Red Lions	1,350.5
2nd place, silver medalist(s)	Benilde Blazers	684.5
3rd place, bronze medalist(s)	EAC Generals	314.5
4	Arellano Chiefs	226.5
5	Letran Knights	180
6	San Sebastian Stags	109.5
7	Mapúa Cardinals	76.5
8	Perpetual Altas	66.5
9	Lyceum Pirates	59.5
10	**JRU Heavy Bombers**	-

Season host is boldfaced.

=== Women's tournament ===
#	Team	Total
1st place, gold medalist(s)	San Beda Red Lionesses	1,161.00
2nd place, silver medalist(s)	**Benilde Lady Blazers**	816.5
3rd place, bronze medalist(s)	EAC Lady Generals	552.00
4	San Sebastian Lady Stags	141.5
5	Lyceum Lady Pirates	130.5
6	Mapúa Lady Cardinals	92.00
7	Arellano Lady Chiefs	70.00
8	Letran Lady Knights	58.00
9	Perpetual Lady Altas	-
10	**JRU Lady Bombers**	-

Season host is boldfaced.

=== Juniors' tournament ===
#	Team	Total
1st place, gold medalist(s)	La Salle Green Hills Greenies	1038.5
2nd place, silver medalist(s)	San Beda Red Cubs	887.00
3rd place, bronze medalist(s)	Lyceum Junior Pirates	254.5
4	San Sebastian Staglets	178.5
5	Letran Squires	172.00
6	Mapúa Red Robins	154.5
7	EAC–ICA Brigadiers	147.00
8	Perpetual Junior Altas	61.00
9	Arellano Braves	17.5
10	**JRU Light Bombers**	12.5

Season host is boldfaced.

== Table Tennis ==
The NCAA tennis tournament opened on Sept. 15. The games were held at the Ninoy Aquino Stadium.

=== First round ===
==== Men's tournament ====
#	Team
1	Benilde Blazers
2	San Beda Red Lions
3	Letran Knights
4	EAC Generals
5	Arellano Chiefs
6	San Sebastian Stags
7	Perpetual Altas
8	Mapúa Cardinals
9	Lyceum Pirates
10	**JRU Heavy Bombers**

Season host is boldfaced.

Qualified to the Second Round.

==== Women's tournament ====
#	Team
1	San Beda Red Lionesses
2	Benilde Lady Blazers
3	Arellano Lady Chiefs
4	EAC Lady Generals
5	Letran Lady Knights
6	Lyceum Lady Pirates
7	San Sebastian Lady Stags
8	Mapúa Lady Cardinals
9	**JRU Lady Bombers**

Season host is boldfaced.

==== Juniors' tournament ====
#	Team
1	San Beda Red Cubs
2	Letran Squires
3	San Sebastian Staglets
4	Arellano Braves
5	Lyceum Junior Pirates
6	Perpetual Junior Altas
7	EAC–ICA Brigadiers
8	La Salle Green Hills Greenies
9	**JRU Light Bombers**
10	Mapúa Red Robins

Season host is boldfaced.

=== Second round ===
==== Men's tournament ====
#	Team
1st place, gold medalist(s)	Benilde Blazers
2nd place, silver medalist(s)	San Beda Red Lions
3rd place, bronze medalist(s)	Letran Knights
4	EAC Generals

==== Women's tournament ====
#	Team
1st place, gold medalist(s)	San Beda Red Lionesses
2nd place, silver medalist(s)	Benilde Lady Blazers
3rd place, bronze medalist(s)	Arellano Lady Chiefs
4	EAC Lady Generals

==== Juniors' tournament ====
#	Team
1st place, gold medalist(s)	San Beda Red Cubs
2nd place, silver medalist(s)	Letran Squires
3rd place, bronze medalist(s)	San Sebastian Staglets
4	Arellano Braves

== Badminton ==
The NCAA badminton tournament opened on September 6, 2014 at the Powerplay Badminton Center.

=== Final Team Standings ===
==== Men's tournament ====
#	Team
1st place, gold medalist(s)	Letran Knights
2nd place, silver medalist(s)	Benilde Blazers
3rd place, bronze medalist(s)	Lyceum Pirates
4	EAC Generals

==== Women's tournament ====
#	Team
1st place, gold medalist(s)	Benilde Lady Blazers
2nd place, silver medalist(s)	Mapúa Lady Cardinals
3rd place, bronze medalist(s)	Letran Lady Knights
4	Lyceum Lady Pirates

==== Juniors' tournament ====
#	Team
1st place, gold medalist(s)	La Salle Green Hills Greenies
2nd place, silver medalist(s)	San Beda Red Cubs
3rd place, bronze medalist(s)	Letran Squires
4	EAC–ICA Brigadiers

== Chess ==
=== Men's tournament ===
==== Elimination round ====
#	Team	Points	Tie
1	Lyceum Pirates	50.5	-
2	Benilde Blazers	47	-
3	Arellano Chiefs	46	-
4	San Beda Red Lions	44.5	-
5	Letran Knights	38	-
6	EAC Generals	34	-
7	Mapúa Cardinals	30	
8	San Sebastian Stags	30	
9	Perpetual Altas	12	-
10	**JRU Heavy Bombers**	8	-

Qualified to the semifinals.

Season host is boldfaced. Probationary teams are italicised.

==== Semifinals ====
#	Team
1st place, gold medalist(s)	Arellano Chiefs
2nd place, silver medalist(s)	Lyceum Pirates
3rd place, bronze medalist(s)	Benilde Blazers
4	San Beda Red Lions

Probationary teams are italicised.

=== Juniors' tournament ===
==== Elimination round ====
#	Team	Points
1	Letran Squires	55
2	La Salle Green Hills Greenies	53.5
3	San Beda Red Cubs	51.5
4	Lyceum Junior Pirates	41.5
5	San Sebastian Staglets	37.5
6	Arellano Braves	33
7	EAC–ICA Brigadiers	30.5
8	Perpetual Junior Altas	27.5
9	Mapúa Red Robins	7
10	**JRU Light Bombers**	3

Qualified to the semifinals.

Season host is boldfaced. Probationary teams are italicised.

==== Semifinals ====
#	Team
1st place, gold medalist(s)	Letran Squires
2nd place, silver medalist(s)	La Salle Green Hills Greenies
3rd place, bronze medalist(s)	San Beda Red Cubs
4	Lyceum Junior Pirates

Probationary teams are italicised.

== General Championship Summary ==
The current point system gives 50 points to the champion team in a certain NCAA event, 40 to the runner-up, and 35 to the third placer. The following points are given in consequent order of finish: 30, 25, 20, 15, 10, 8 and 6. For every non-participation of a member school, 5 points will be deducted to the point system.

Pts.	Position
50	Champion
40	2nd
35	3rd
30	4th
25	5th
20	6th
10	7th
8	8th
6	9th
4	10th
0	Did not join
WD	Withdrew

=== Medal table ===
Rank	Team	Gold	Silver	Bronze	Total
1	San Beda Red Lions	5	1	–	6
2	Benilde Blazers	2	3	2	7
3	Arellano Chiefs	3	3	–	6
4	Letran Knights	2	–	2	4
5	Lyceum Pirates	–	1	1	2
6	Mapúa Cardinals	–	1	–	1
7	EAC Generals	–	–	2	2
8	JRU Heavy Bombers	–	–	1	1
9	San Sebastian Stags	–	–	–	–
10	Perpetual Altas	–	–	–	–
Total		8	8	8	24

=== Seniors' Division ===
Rank	School	Basketball	Chess	Men's Badminton	Women's Badminton	Men's Swimming	Women's Swimming	Men's table tennis	Women's table tennis	Men's Taekwondo	Women's Taekwondo	Men's Volleyball	Women's volleyball	Lawn tennis	Soft tennis	Football	Men's beach volleyball	Women's beach volleyball	Track and field	Pts.
1	San Beda	50	30	15	15	45	40	40	45	45	45	–	–	–	–	–	–	–	–	370
2	Benilde	25	35	35	40	35	30	50	30	20	35	–	–	–	–	–	–	–	–	335
3	Arellano	40	50	20	8	25	8	30	35	35	–	–	–	–	–	–	–	–	–	251
4	Lyceum	15	40	30	20	6	15	8	15	25	30	–	–	–	–	–	–	–	–	204
5	Letran	20	25	40	25	20	6	35	25	–	–	–	–	–	–	–	–	–	–	196
6	EAC	7	20	25	6	30	25	25	20	–	–	–	–	–	–	–	–	–	–	158
7	San Sebastian	10	15	0	0	15	20	20	10	30	25	–	–	–	–	–	–	–	–	145
8	Mapúa	7	10	10	30	10	10	10	8	–	–	–	–	–	–	–	–	–	30	125
9	JRU	35	6	6	0	0	0	6	6	0	0	–	–	–	–	–	–	–	50	109
10	Perpetual	30	8	8	10	8	0	15	0	–	–	–	–	–	–	–	–	–	–	79

== See also ==
- UAAP Season 77
