= NCAA Season 97 =

- Host school: De La Salle–College of Saint Benilde
- Tagline: "Stronger Together, Buo ang Puso" (transl. Wholehearted)

Seniors' champions
Sport		Men	Women
Basketball		Letran	NT
Volleyball		NT	Benilde

Juniors' champions
Sport		Boys	Girls
- (NT) = No tournament; (DS) = Demonstration Sport; (Ex) = Exhibition;

NCAA Season 97 was the 2021–22 athletic year of the National Collegiate Athletic Association (NCAA) in the Philippines hosted by De La Salle - College of Saint Benilde.

== Background ==
Colegio de San Juan de Letran's chairman awarded the Head of Sports Varsity and External Relation to the host by giving him the NCAA Flag and to host NCAA Season 97 in the closing ceremony. The Commission on Higher Education held a COVID-19 vaccination drive for the NCAA's student athletes which led the NCAA Management Committee (MANCOM) to seriously consider the return of face-to-face events after solely holding online events in the last season due to the prevailing COVID-19 pandemic.

The opening of season 97 was originally scheduled to begin on March 5, 2022 but was postponed to March 26, 2022 and tipped-off at St. Benilde Gym.

NCAA Season 97, which has the theme of “Stronger Together. Buo ang Puso”, will have a five gamedays a week calendar (Tuesday-Wednesday & Friday-Sunday). Two games will take place during each gameday. The NCAA will only hold a single round-robin tournament with a play-in. The third- and fourth-ranked teams will face off after the regular season to determine the third seed. The loser of the game will face the winner of the bout between the fifth and sixth-ranked schools to determine the fourth seed.

== Basketball ==
The season will be held with five gamedays a week calendar, with two games being played in each gameday. These gamedays are scheduled between Tuesdays, Wednesdays, Fridays, Saturdays and Sundays.

=== Seniors' tournament ===
==== Elimination round ====
Pos	Team	W	L	PCT	GB	Qualification
1	Letran Knights	9	0	1.000	—	Twice-to-beat in the semifinals
2	Mapúa Cardinals	7	2	.778 (Note: Head-to-head record: Mapúa 1–0 San Beda)	2	Twice-to-beat in the semifinals
3	San Beda Red Lions	7	2	.778	2	Advance to third seed playoff
4	Benilde Blazers (H)	5	4	.556	4	Advance to third seed playoff
5	Perpetual Altas	4	5	.444 (Note: Head-to-head record: Perpetual 1–0 Arellano)	5	Proceed to qualifying playoff
6	Arellano Chiefs	4	5	.444	5	Proceed to qualifying playoff
7	EAC Generals	3	6	.333 (Note: Head-to-head record: EAC 1–0 San Sebastian)	6	
8	San Sebastian Stags	3	6	.333	6	
9	LPU Pirates	2	7	.222	7	
10	JRU Heavy Bombers	1	8	.111	8	

Source: GMA Network-NCAA Philippines
Rules for classification: 1) winning percentage; 2) head-to-head record; 3) head-to-head point differential; 4) overall point differential
(H) Hosts

==== Play-in tournament ====
Play-in games
Third seed playoff
3	San Beda	63
4	Benilde	57
Qualifying playoff
5	Perpetual	59
6	Arellano	52

Fourth seed playoff
4	Benilde	64
5	Perpetual	76

==== Playoffs ====
Semifinals (Top 2 twice-to-beat)
1	Letran	77
4	Perpetual	75
2	Mapúa	67	70
3	San Beda	73*	67

Finals (Best-of-three series)
1	Letran	68	75
2	Mapúa	63	65

*Overtime

== Volleyball ==
=== Women's tournament ===
==== Elimination round ====
Pos	Team	Pld	W	L	Pts	SW	SL	SR	SPW	SPL	SPR	
1	Benilde Lady Blazers	9	9	0	27	27	1	27.000	692	411	1.684	Advance to the finals (Note: As Benilde won all of their elimination round games, the stepladder format will be used instead of the regular Final Four format.)
2	Arellano Lady Chiefs	9	7	2	21	21	10	2.100	730	630	1.159	Proceed to stepladder round 2
3	San Sebastian Lady Stags	9	6	3	17	22	15	1.467	860	742	1.159	Proceed to stepladder round 1
4	JRU Lady Bombers	9	5	4	15	18	16	1.125	708	734	0.965	Proceed to stepladder round 1
5	Mapúa Lady Cardinals (H)	9	5	4	11	16	20	0.800	709	769	0.922	
6	LPU Lady Pirates	9	4	5	13	18	19	0.947	789	807	0.978	
7	Perpetual Lady Altas	8	2	6	8	11	18	0.611	630	698	0.903	
8	San Beda Red Lionesses	8	2	6	8	12	20	0.600	656	761	0.862	
9	EAC Lady Generals	9	2	7	7	9	23	0.391	638	747	0.854	
10	Letran Lady Knights	9	2	7	5	11	23	0.478	692	775	0.893	

Source: GMA Network-NCAA
Rules for classification: 1) Number of wins; 2) match points; 3) sets ratio; 4) points ratio; 5) head-to-head record
(H) Host
Notes:

Point system:

3 points = win match in 3 or 4 sets
2 points = win match in 5 sets
1 point = lose match in 5 sets
0 point = lose match in 3 or 4 sets

==== Playoffs ====
First round
3	San Sebastian	2
4	JRU	3

Second round
2	Arellano	3
4	JRU	1

Final
1	Benilde	3	3
2	Arellano	0	0

== Taekwondo ==
=== Seniors' tournament ===
==== Men ====
Speedkicking - Finweight
Rank	Name	Team	Score
1st place, gold medalist(s)	Shinta Nakashima	San Beda Red Lions	7.700
2nd place, silver medalist(s)	Bon Sylwin Magcalayo	EAC Generals	7.117
3rd place, bronze medalist(s)	Rey isaiah Fausto	Benilde Blazers	6.883
4	Hadrian Cayle Miel	San Sebastian Stags	6.750
5	Jose Raphael Daleon	Arellano Chiefs	6.983

Speedkicking - Flyweight
Rank	Name	Team	Score
1st place, gold medalist(s)	Celsius Ryckylel Cane Barinan	Benilde Blazers	7.492
2nd place, silver medalist(s)	Ivan Karl Esquillo	San Beda Red Lions	7.483
3rd place, bronze medalist(s)	Rey Tambulian Jr.	Arellano Chiefs	7.358
4	Nathaniel Bitara	EAC Generals	7.250
5	Simon Regalario	Arellano Chiefs	7.050
6	Francis Job Anthony Odal	San Beda Red Lions	6.967
7	Kian Graydon Ashe	Benilde Blazers	6.625
8	Frain Reyes	San Sebastian Stags	6.983

Speedkicking - Bantamweight
Rank	Name	Team	Score
1st place, gold medalist(s)	Jack Janggo Natividad	San Beda Red Lions	7.183
2nd place, silver medalist(s)	Justin Carl Dominic Nacua	Benilde Blazers	7.125
3rd place, bronze medalist(s)	Axl Zerrudo	San Sebastian Stags	7.033
4	Mikko Jeremi Bataoil	JRU Heavy Bombers	6.842
5	Stanley Roy Laguio	Arellano Chiefs	6.667
6	Kim Richardson Ramiro	EAC Generals	6.292
7	Gerico Sy	Benilde Blazers	5.375

Speedkicking - Featherweight
Rank	Name	Team	Score
1st place, gold medalist(s)	Joash Aloven Tanap	San Beda Red Lions	7.617
2nd place, silver medalist(s)	Jan Ynigo Bataga	EAC Generals	7.308
3rd place, bronze medalist(s)	Kint Khelly Tarucan	Arellano Chiefs	7.033
4	Laurence Scott Santiago	Benilde Blazers	6.775
5	Christian Dave Tayrusc	Arellano Chiefs	6.642
6	RR Jhay Roque	San Sebastian Stags	6.600
7	Isaah Mickael Tagle	JRU Heavy Bombers	6.417
8	Louisse Miguel Israel	Letran Knights	6.325
9	Gianne Kyle Legaspi	San Beda Red Lions	6.292
10	Jake Aldrin Ramos	LPU Pirates	5.633

Speedkicking - Lightweight
Rank	Name	Team	Score
1st place, gold medalist(s)	Ralph Laurenz Gasco	EAC Generals	7.735
2nd place, silver medalist(s)	Piolo Mari Jazmines	Benilde Blazers	7.708
3rd place, bronze medalist(s)	John Drew Compahinay	San Sebastian Stags	7.192
4	Michael Noel Boncales	JRU Heavy Bombers	7.117

Speedkicking - Welterweight
Rank	Name	Team	Score
1st place, gold medalist(s)	Josemari Aiko Ong	Benilde Blazers	7.733
2nd place, silver medalist(s)	Alfritz Arevalo	San Beda Red Lions	7.583
3rd place, bronze medalist(s)	Terence Ciriaco	Arellano Chiefs	6.400
4	John Harold Estoy	San Sebastian Stags	6.350
5	Andrei Bautista	San Sebastian Stags	5.650

==== Women ====
Speedkicking - Finweight
Rank	Name	Team	Score
1st place, gold medalist(s)	Catherine Joy Vicente	Arellano Lady Chiefs	7.183
2nd place, silver medalist(s)	Chelsla Marie Bañez	EAC Lady Generals	7.158
3rd place, bronze medalist(s)	Mikee Medina	Arellano Lady Chiefs	6.883
4	Stephanie Shane Ashley Araña	Letran Lady Knights	6.750
5	Nicole Anne Calasara	San Beda Red Lionesses	6.983
6	Joselle Daguinod	Benilde Lady Blazers	6.583
7	Keith Laura Baladya	San Sebastian Lady Stags	5.925
8	Kyla Carryle Austria	JRU Lady Bombers	5.725

Speedkicking - Flyweight
Rank	Name	Team	Score
1st place, gold medalist(s)	Krizelle Therese Yadao	Benilde Lady Blazers	7.567
2nd place, silver medalist(s)	Emie Fernandez	JRU Lady Bombers	7.417
3rd place, bronze medalist(s)	Paula Julia Alfon	Arellano Lady Chiefs	7.133
4	Claire Ysshabelle Blanco	San Beda Red Lionesses	7.100
5	Twinkle Angela Bokingkito	San Sebastian Lady Stags	6.867

Speedkicking - Bantamweight
Rank	Name	Team	Score
1st place, gold medalist(s)	Adessa Grace Del Castillo	Letran Lady Knights	7.142
2nd place, silver medalist(s)	Janna Ysabel Velez	San Beda Red Lionesses	7.092
3rd place, bronze medalist(s)	Pauelene Gaye Rey	Arellano Lady Chiefs	7.075
4	Tanya Mosquera	Benilde Lady Blazers	7.008
5	Perjean Sevillejo	San Sebastian Lady Stags	7.000
6	Angel Pode Ramos	Arellano Lady Chiefs	6.942
7	Maria Laney Kaye Panahon	San Beda Red Lionesses	6.900
8	Dannise Nicole Buan	EAC Lady Generals	9.792
9	Maria Jiana Ambulo	JRU Lady Bombers	6.367
10	Marinella De Peralta	LPU Lady Pirates	5.958

Speedkicking - Featherweight
Rank	Name	Team	Score
1st place, gold medalist(s)	Thelma Rose Tiangson	Arellano Lady Chiefs	7.433
2nd place, silver medalist(s)	Princess Angel Doria	San Beda Red Lionesses	7.300 (3.0)
3rd place, bronze medalist(s)	Alexandra Nesle	Arellano Lady Chiefs	7.300 (2.4)
4	Melissa Maxine Arsenal	Benilde Lady Blazers	7.092
5	Shyenler Cedo	JRU Lady Bombers	6.700
6	Liza Leslie Bagay	San Sebastian Lady Stags	6.600
7	Melody Dulay	San Beda Red Lionesses	6.558
8	Daniela Rosales	LPU Lady Pirates	5.608

Speedkicking - Lightweight
Rank	Name	Team	Score
1st place, gold medalist(s)	Hanna Dianito Natalio	Arellano Lady Chiefs	7.033
2nd place, silver medalist(s)	Khrystal Marie Mauro	Arellano Lady Chiefs	6.917
3rd place, bronze medalist(s)	Hazel Ann Estoy	San Sebastian Lady Stags	6.750
4	Rocio Diaz	Benilde Lady Blazers	6.533
5	Gwindalynne Gutierrez	San Beda Red Lionesses	6.467
5	Princess Lyka Tordillos	San Sebastian Lady Stags	6.467
7	Katrina Allysa Mariano	San Beda Red Lionesses	6.350
8	Daezelle Eloisa Jariol	Benilde Lady Blazers	6.267

Speedkicking - Welterweight
Rank	Name	Team	Score
1st place, gold medalist(s)	Loralee Natividad	Benilde Lady Blazers	7.333
2nd place, silver medalist(s)	Katrina Clerka Alpuerto	Benilde Lady Blazers	7.092
3rd place, bronze medalist(s)	Francis Claire Apuya	Arellano Lady Chiefs	6.900
4	Krtistine Antoniette Kiamco	San Beda Red Lionesses	6.833
5	Rosin Nicole Telada	San Sebastian Lady Stags	6.567

Speedkicking - Middleweight
Rank	Name	Team	Score
1st place, gold medalist(s)	Shiela Mae Samson	Benilde Lady Blazers	7.683
2nd place, silver medalist(s)	Rizza Rose Collado	San Beda Red Lionesses	7.533
3rd place, bronze medalist(s)	Ashley Judd Felipe	Benilde Lady Blazers	7.092
4	Kezia Eustaquio	Arellano Lady Chiefs	6.933
5	Gabrielle Manchera Salomon	San Beda Red Lionesses	6.317

Speedkicking - Heavyweight
Rank	Name	Team	Score
1st place, gold medalist(s)	Ethel Jayd Palconit	Benilde Lady Blazers	7.200
2nd place, silver medalist(s)	Daniella Patrice Malmis	EAC Lady Generals	7.192
3rd place, bronze medalist(s)	Sofia Nicole Bacusa	JRU Lady Bombers	7.150
4	Micaela Leigh Musngi	San Sebastian Lady Stags	7.008
5	Anne Christine Obenza	Benilde Lady Blazers	6.975
6	Armaelyn Agudulo	Arellano Lady Chiefs	6.950
7	Aliciarose Gonzales	Letran Lady Knights	6.850
8	Roxanne Candatu	San Beda Red Lionesses	6.617

=== Juniors' tournament ===
Speedkicking - Bantamweight
Rank	Name	Team	Score
1st place, gold medalist(s)	John Marco Medallada	San Beda Red Cubs	7.542
2nd place, silver medalist(s)	Kimichi Ramirez	La Salle Green Hills Greenies	7.450
3rd place, bronze medalist(s)	Rodel Tamayo II	EAC–ICA Brigadiers	6.942
4	Dirk Ranque	LPU Junior Pirates	6.825
5	Vince Raiane Santianez	San Beda Red Cubs	6.633

Speedkicking - Featherweight
Rank	Name	Team	Score
1st place, gold medalist(s)	Reymundo Calamba III	San Beda Red Cubs	7.633
2nd place, silver medalist(s)	Ken Jireh Cuyugan	EAC–ICA Brigadiers	7.108
3rd place, bronze medalist(s)	Manuel Dalayoan III	La Salle Green Hills Greenies	6.958
4	Kent John Ilde Banzon	Arellano Braves	6.775
5	John Patrick Moneda	LPU Junior Pirates	6.750
6	Aaron Isaac Sevilla	San Sebastian Staglets	6.108
7	Zhyroll Liem Manahan	San Beda Red Cubs	6.050

Speedkicking - Welterweight
Rank	Name	Team	Score
1st place, gold medalist(s)	Victor Emmanuel Rodriguez	La Salle Green Hills Greenies	7.750
2nd place, silver medalist(s)	John Mc Leary Ornido	EAC–ICA Brigadiers	6.892
3rd place, bronze medalist(s)	Emanuel Duran	EAC–ICA Brigadiers	6.417
4	Vic Lorenz Castillo	Arellano Braves	6.000
5	Orbivitano Diaz	San Beda Red Cubs	5.692
6	Justin Pierre Echiverri	San Sebastian Staglets	4.958

Speedkicking - Light middleweight
Rank	Name	Team	Score
1st place, gold medalist(s)	Raphael Ongkiko	La Salle Green Hills Greenies	7.133
2nd place, silver medalist(s)	James Christian Bernal	La Salle Green Hills Greenies	7.033
3rd place, bronze medalist(s)	John Jezra Sasutona	JRU Light Bombers	6.967
4	Angelmark Ramos	Arellano Braves	6.700
5	Joaquin Miguel Mendoza	La Salle Green Hills Greenies	5.967
6	Xenen Leonard Mauhay	San Beda Red Cubs	5.817

Speedkicking - Middleweight
Rank	Name	Team	Score
1st place, gold medalist(s)	Javier Dexter Macasaet	La Salle Green Hills Greenies	7.758
2nd place, silver medalist(s)	Seth Nathaniel Go	San Beda Red Cubs	7.050
3rd place, bronze medalist(s)	Naoki Copioso	LPU Junior Pirates	6.708 (4.233)
4	Mark Wilson Opada	Arellano Braves	6.708 (4.117)
5	John Keirth Beramo	EAC–ICA Brigadiers	6.667
6	Jian Matthew Ambulo	JRU Light Bombers	6.217

Speedkicking - Light heavyweight
Rank	Name	Team	Score
1st place, gold medalist(s)	Bermel Dionela Jr.	EAC–ICA Brigadiers	6.858
2nd place, silver medalist(s)	Louell Ivannerich Mamaclay	San Beda Red Cubs	6.333

Speedkicking - Heavyweight
Rank	Name	Team	Score
1st place, gold medalist(s)	Chauncey Avery Hachero	La Salle Green Hills Greenies	7.283
2nd place, silver medalist(s)	Michael John Mahinay	San Beda Red Cubs	6.617
3rd place, bronze medalist(s)	Kier Lawrence Mesina	LPU Junior Pirates	6.542
4	Marcus Niel Delos Santos	EAC–ICA Brigadiers	6.317
5	Zaphrael Rey Casareo	La Salle Green Hills Greenies	5.667

== See also ==
- UAAP Season 84
