= Benilde Blazers and Lady Blazers =

College sports program

De La Salle-College of Saint Benilde Blazers and Lady Blazers
- School: De La Salle-College of Saint Benilde
- League: NCAA and WNCAA
- Joined: 1998
- Location: College (DLS–CSB) – 2544 Taft Avenue, Malate, Manila (Srs.); High School (LSGH) – 343 Ortigas Ave., Greenhills, Mandaluyong (Jrs.)
- Team colors: Green, black, and white
- Women's team: Lady Blazers
- Juniors' team: La Salle Green Hills Greenies

Seniors' general championships
- NCAA: 6 2005–06, 2007–08, 2008–09, 2013–14, 2014–15, 2025–26; WNCAA: 2 1997, 1998

Juniors' general championships
- NCAA: 4 2003–04, 2004–05, 2007–08, 2008–09 (LSGH under DLS–CSB)

The De La Salle-College of Saint Benilde Blazers and Lady Blazers are the NCAA senior varsity teams of De La Salle–College of Saint Benilde.

The Blazers were formerly a member of the National Capital Region Athletic Association (NCRAA) before being admitted to the NCAA in 1998. They then went on to win their first NCAA seniors basketball title in 2000, the fastest for an expansion squad.

The college's male juniors team counterpart are the Benilde–LSGH Greenies represented by La Salle Green Hills.

Almost all sports programs of the Blazers excel in their events, leading to the De La Salle-College of Saint Benilde winning its first ever General Championship in NCAA Season 81, and again in NCAA Season 83, NCAA Season 84, NCAA Season 89, and NCAA Season 90.

== Name ==
As homage to the school which introduced several pioneering degree programs in the country, the college adopted the BLAZERS as their moniker. It is a short term for Trailblazers, which emphasizes the college's commitment to set a standard for innovative quality education as well as sports development.

== With the La Salle Green Hills Greenies ==
The Junior Blazers are the junior counterparts of the DLS-CSB Blazers

When De La Salle University selected De La Salle Santiago Zobel School as its junior affiliate team when it entered the UAAP in 1986, La Salle Green Hills was left without membership in either the UAAP or the NCAA, thus starting a 17-year drought in a major collegiate league since its formal withdrawal from the NCAA in 1981.

De La Salle–College of Saint Benilde, a member school of the De La Salle University System, applied for admission to the NCAA through the efforts of the System President Br. Andrew Gonzalez, FSC, the Greenies were selected as the juniors team by then LSGH President Br. Bernard Oca FSC. Both De La Salle-College of Saint Benilde and La Salle Green Hills were admitted to the NCAA in 1998.

The La Salle Greenies (officially the Benilde–LSGH Greenies in the NCAA) is the juniors basketball team of the De La Salle-College of Saint Benilde Blazers. Since DLS–CSB is not directly connected with its high school affiliate, except that they are both administered by the Lasallian Christian Brothers, LSGH labels "Benilde" instead of "La Salle" on their jerseys.

The Blazers' senior varsity uniforms added the initials 'LSGH' in their uniforms, starting with Season 89, and during games, the Benilde Green Pepper Squad began to distribute clappers with 'La Salle' written on them. These were done to further connect both schools and their Lasallian roots.

In addition, beginning with Season 86, the Blazers replaced black with green as their primary uniform color, in time for the centennial anniversary of Lasallian education in the Philippines. Black remains an accent color.

== With De La Salle Zobel in WNCAA ==
In contrast to their men's junior counterparts, DLSZ represents College of St. Benilde in the WNCAA since the NCAA did not have a women's basketball tournament.

The De La Salle Lady Junior Archers have been the WNCAA Junior Division Champions for eight straight years, from 1993 to 2000 and again in 2004.

== Saint Benilde–San Sebastian Rivalry ==
School colors of CSB and SSC-R.

This short-lived rivalry was sparked when DLS-CSB, who only joined the league in 1998, met the San Sebastian College–Recoletos (or simply Baste) in the finals of 2000 and 2002. CSB won the 2000 Finals, bannered by what is dubbed as the best CSB Blazers team ever assembled. With former NCAA MVP Sunday Salvacion, Jondan Salvador, and Al Magpayo, the Blazers beat the formidable San Sebastian Stags and won their first NCAA seniors basketball championship title, despite joining the league 2 seasons earlier. This marks the fastest win for any new school in the league since WWII.

However, the Stags avenged their defeat and defeated the Blazers in the 2002 Finals. The Golden Stags, led by graduating players Christian Coronel, Nurjanjam Alfad, Paul Reguerra, Roy Falcasantos, and Bernardo Mercado, swept the Blazers, 2–0. Mercado later joined SSC-R's coaching staff as an assistant coach. Leomar Najorda was adjudged as the 2002 NCAA Men's Basketball tournament Finals MVP.

== NCAA General Champions ==
As of 2015, the CSB Blazers have earned five General Championships, winning three of these in a span of four years, being runners-up to PCU in the 2006–07 season. They won double championships with LSGH in NCAA Season 83 (2007–08 season) and NCAA Season 84 (2008–09 season). The Blazers won more Seniors General Championships in NCAA Season 89 (2013–14 season) and NCAA Season 90 (2014-15 season).

Their junior counterparts, LSGH, won two General Championships as De La Salle College and the other eight General Championship as LSGH. As the DLS–CSB juniors team, LSGH has won four General Championships.

== NCAA Season 82 hosting ==
Sports logo prior to NCAA Season 91

De La Salle–College of Saint Benilde served hosting rights for the first time in the 2006–2007 season of the NCAA, with the theme "Proud and True at 82: Blazing Beyond Limits". Under the leadership of the Sports and Development Office (SDO), the Benildean community flocked to fill the Araneta Coliseum on opening day. The number of Benildeans in the arena was only rivaled by that of the NCAA 2000 finals, as the Dome was rocked by chants of "Animo Benilde!".

The College again hosted the NCAA after one rotation, in NCAA Season 89, and again in NCAA Season 97.

Blazie, the official mascot of the 82nd NCAA season, was created by the DLS-CSB Multimedia Arts students and Marketing Communications Office (MCO) student staff Charmaine Collen Hao.

== CSB pep squad and NCAA cheerleading competition ==
The De La Salle-College of Saint Benilde's pep squad has been officially known as the CSB Green Peppers (from 2005) and then later on as the CSB Pep Squad (since 2007).

Since the inception of the event, the CSB Pep Squad has always placed last (7th) from 2004 and 2005, were suspended by the school in 2006, 6th in 2007, and then placed their highest rank ever as second runner-up in 2008.

Select members of the CSB pep squad, along with the DLSU, LSGH and DLSZ pep squads, performed together at halftime of Game 1 of the La Salle-Ateneo UAAP Finals on September 18, 2008, in commemoration of Saint Benilde's 20th anniversary, De La Salle Zobel's 30th anniversary, and the incoming 100th anniversary of the De La Salle schools in the Philippines in 2011.

== WNCAA Senior Division women's basketball ==
The 1997 line-up of the Lady Blazers basketball team holds the honor of giving College of Saint Benilde its very first championship in women's basketball by beating rival Lyceum College on October 12, 1997. The following year, they were crowned WNCAA's back-to-back champions.

1997 WNCAA Benilde Lady Blazer Basketball Champions roster
Players
Coaches

Pos.	No.	Nat.	Name	Height	Year	High School
Shooting guard, Forward	10		Salipsip, Bea (C)	–	–	–
Shooting guard, Forward	11		Zamora, Nicki (CC)	–	–	–
Point guard	4		San Juan, Sj	–	–	–
Shooting guard, Forward	8		Jacinto, Cheryl	–	–	–
Point guard, Forward	6		De la Cruz, Tina	–	–	–
Center, Power forward	7		Macalintal, Khakls	–	–	–
Point guard, Shooting guard	12		Bravante, Maris	–	–	–
Center	17		Itable, Mk	–	–	–
Center, Forward	16		Hagape, Russell	–	–	–
Forward	5		Dimayuga, Barby	–	–	–
Center	19		Macatangay, Jencee	–	–	–
Center, Power forward	15		Cruz, Jean	–	–	–
Forward	18		Go, Jovy	–	–	–
Point Guard	9		So, Sarah	–	–	–
Forward	14		Villaruz, Valerie	–	–	–

Head coach

- (Philippines) Cholo Martin

Assistant coach(es)

- Antonio "Tatang" Mendoza

Athletic trainer(s)

Sandy

Team manager

Tina Lee

Legend

- (C) Team captain
- Injured

Notable players

- Jean Cruz – 2016 Women's PBA 3x3, Played with Blackwater

Coaches

- Antonio "Tatang" Mendoza (1994–1996)
- Cholo Martin (1996–1997)
- Angelina "Piao" Fedilliaga (1998–2009)

== Volleyball ==
NCAA Season 91 women's volleyball champions
Jannine Navarro, Djanel Welch Cheng (c), Rachel Anne Austrero, Diane Ventura, Chelsea Anne Umali, Jeanette Panaga, Melanie Torres, Jane Frances Borrero, Chelsea Chloe Santillan, Christine Danielle Lim, Ellaine Monica Dolorito, Bianca Gabrielle Lizares, Jan Arianne Daguil, Ranya Musa
Head coach: Michael "Macky" Cariño

NCAA Season 97 women's volleyball champions
Mycah Go (c), Chenae Basarte, Cathrina Dizon, Michelle Gamit, Kim Alison Estenzo, Queen Ann Salmon, Angelika Mondejar, Jade Gentapa, Cloanne Sophia Mondoñedo, Fiona Naomi Getigan, Jhasmin Gayle Pascual, Ma. Camill Avila, Corrine Alysson Apostol, Cristy Ondangan
Head coach: Jerry Yee

NCAA Season 98 women's volleyball champions
Cloanne Sophia Mondoñedo (c), Mycah Go, Chenae Basarte, Michelle Gamit, Kim Alison Estenzo, Fiona Naomi Getigan, Angelika Mondejar, Jade Gentapa, Jhasmin Gayle Pascual, Ma. Camill Avila, Corrine Alysson Apostol, Wielyn Estoque, Jessa Dorog, Cristy Ondangan, Zamantha Nolasco
Head coach: Jerry Yee

NCAA Season 99 women's volleyball champions
Cloanne Sophia Mondoñedo (c), Chenae Basarte, Michelle Gamit, Kim Alison Estenzo, Fiona Naomi Getigan, Jade Gentapa, Jhasmin Gayle Pascual, Corrine Alysson Apostol, Wielyn Estoque, Jessa Dorog, Cristy Ondangan, Zamantha Nolasco
Head coach: Jerry Yee

== Gallery ==
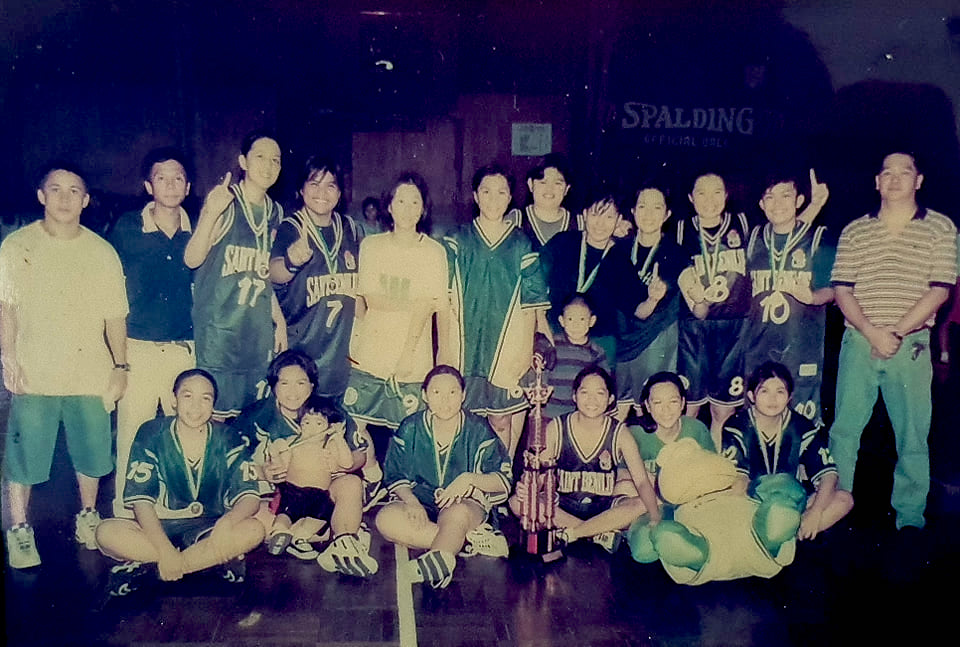
L–R Back row: Jello Nedira, Sandy, Mark Itable, Khakls Macalintal, Sarah So, Russell Hagape, Jencee Macatangay, Tina Dela Cruz, Nicki Zamora, Cheryl Jacinto, Bea Salipsip, and Coach Cholo. L–R Front Row: Jean Cruz, Barby Dimayuga, Jovy Go, SJ San Juan, Val Villaruz, and Maris Bravante

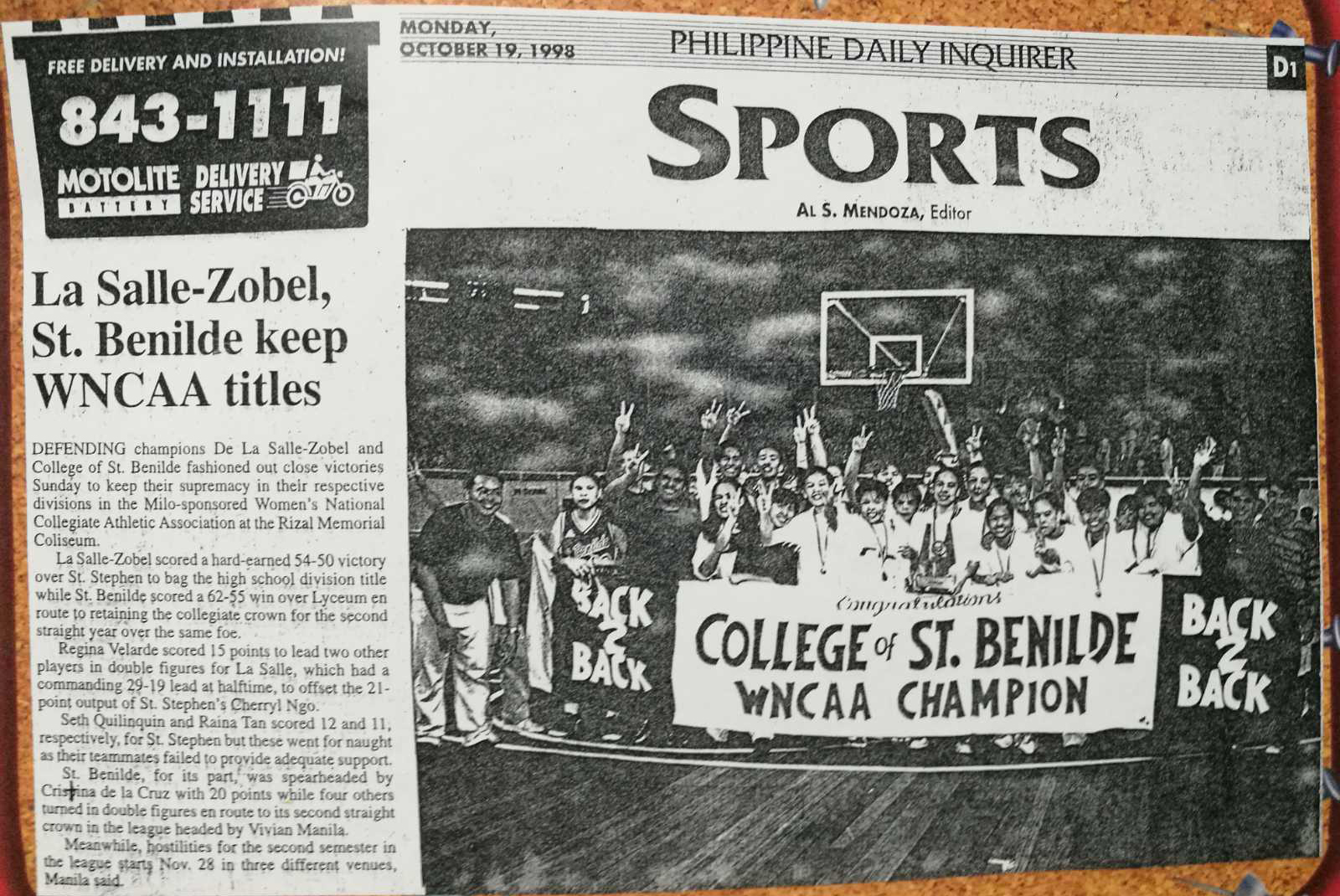
Newspaper clipping Philippines Daily Inquirer October 19, 1998

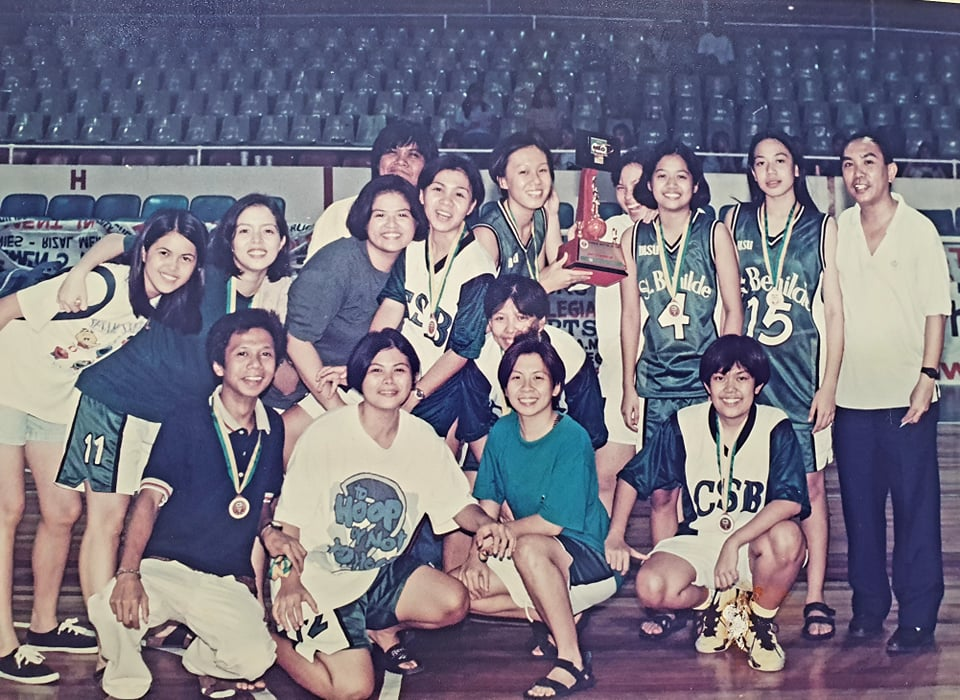
L–R Back row: Wella Flores, Barby Dimayuga, Khakls Macalintal, Russell Hapage, Joanne Limoanco, Jovy Go, SJ San Juan, and Jean Cruz. L–R Front row: Sandy, Maris Bravante, Tina Dela Cruz, Jennifer King, and Bea Salipsip
