= 2004 Letran Knights basketball team =

Philippine college basketball team

2004 Letran Knights men's basketball

NCAA Season 80 semifinalist

Record
- Elims rank: #3
- Final rank: #3
- 2004 record: 10–6 (9–5 elims)
- Head coach: Louie Alas (4th season)
- Captain: Ronjay Enrile (4th season)

The 2004 Letran Knights men's basketball team represented Colegio de San Juan de Letran in the 80th season of the National Collegiate Athletic Association in the Philippines. The men's basketball tournament for the school year 2004-05 began on June 26, 2004, and the host school for the season was University of Perpetual Help System DALTA.

The Knights, the Season 79 champions, finished the double round-robin eliminations at third place with 9 wins against 5 losses. The Knights, holding a twice-to-beat disadvantage in the Final Four against PCU Dolphins, won the first game thus forcing a knockout match. They were eliminated in the next game by the eventual champions Dolphins.

== Roster ==
Letran Knights roster
Players
Coaches

Pos.	No.	Nat.	Name	Height	Year	High School
G	4	(Philippines)	Alcaraz, John Paul	5'11" (1.8m)	1st	–
G	5	(Philippines)	Santos, Radjan Dale G.	5'10" (1.78m)	5th	Don Bosco Academy
C	6	(Philippines)	Andaya, Mark Anthony	6'7" (2.01m)	1st	Adamson University
G	7	(Philippines)	Balneg, Mark Anthony	6'2" (1.88m)	2nd	Colegio de San Juan de Letran
G	8	(Philippines)	Bautista, Boyet	5'8" (1.73m)	3rd	Colegio de San Juan de Letran
G	9	(Philippines)	Enrile, Ronjay (C)	5'11" (1.8m)	4th	Colegio de San Juan de Letran
C	10	(Philippines)	Rodriguez, Frederick	6'4" (1.93m)	3rd	Bataan National High School of Arts and Trade
C	11	(Philippines)	Pinera, Jonathan	6'5" (1.96m)	2nd	–
F	12	(Philippines)	Aldave, Jonathan	6'2" (1.88m)	3rd	San Andres Vocational School
F	13	(Philippines)	Mondragon, Hafer	6'0" (1.83m)	1st	–
C	14	(Philippines)	Realista, Michael John	6'4" (1.93m)	3rd	–
F	15	(Philippines)	Anabo, Billy Ray	6'2" (1.88m)	3rd	Colegio de San Juan de Letran
F	15	(Philippines)	Quinday, Andro Gil	6'2" (1.88m)	2nd	–
F	17	(Philippines)	Aban, Aaron Abril	6'3" (1.91m)	3rd	Liceo de Cagayan University
F	18	(Philippines)	Ebajay, Norman	6'2" (1.88m)	3rd	Liceo de Cagayan University

Head coach

- Francisco Luis Alas

Assistant coach(es)

- Carmelo Alas
- Justino Pinat

Team manager

- Ramon Oben

Legend

- (C) Team captain
- Injured

=== Depth chart ===
Pos.	Starting 5	Bench 1	Bench 2
C	Andaya	Pinera	Ebajay
PF	Rodriguez	Realista	Santos
SF	Aban	Mondragon	Anabo
SG	Enrile	Aldave	Quinday
PG	Bautista	Alcaraz	Balneg

== Suspensions ==
- The NCAA Management Committee (Mancom) slapped Letran center Eric Rodriguez with a one-game suspension for an unsportsmanlike behavior during their second-round matchup against Perpetual Altas. Letran officials then filed a temporary restraining order from Manila Regional Trial Court to prevent the enforcement of suspending Rodriguez. NCAA Mancom chairman Michael Del Mundo blasted the Letran administration for questioning its judgment to suspend Rodriguez. Rodriguez did not play in their next game against the Mapua Cardinals.
- Letran guard Ronjay Enrile was suspended for one game after a skirmish with San Sebastian's Leo Najorda in their final game date of the elimination round. Enrile was also sidelined after allegedly spitting on Perpetual's Noy Javier in their first round matchup. He sat out in the Final Four match against PCU Dolphins.

== NCAA Season 80 games results ==
Elimination games were played in a double round-robin format. All games were aired on Studio 23.

Date	Time	Opponent	Venue	Result	Record
First round of eliminations
Jun 26	7:30 p.m.	PCU Dolphins	Araneta Coliseum • Quezon City	W 84–76	1–0
Game Highs: Points: Enrile – 20; Rebounds: Andaya – 8; Assists: Bautista – 5
Jul 2	4:00 p.m.	Mapúa Cardinals	Rizal Memorial Coliseum • Manila	L 76–86	1–1
Game Highs: Points: Enrile – 20; Rebounds: Andaya – 8; Assists: Bautista – 5
Jul 7	2:00 p.m.	San Beda Red Lions	Rizal Memorial Coliseum • Manila	W 70–55	2–1
Game Highs: Points: Enrile – 16; Rebounds: Aban – 8; Assists: Aban – 7
Jul 9	4:00 p.m.	JRU Heavy Bombers	Rizal Memorial Coliseum • Manila	W 62–45	3–1
Game Highs: Points: Enrile – 16; Rebounds: Andaya – 9; Assists: Bautista – 5
Jul 16	2:00 p.m.	Benilde Blazers	Rizal Memorial Coliseum • Manila	W 70–51	4–1
Game Highs: Points: Pinera – 14; Rebounds: Rodriguez – 10; Assists: Enrile – 6
Jul 23	4:00 p.m.	Perpetual Altas	Rizal Memorial Coliseum • Manila	L 68–71	4–2
Game Highs: Points: Enrile, Andaya – 12; Rebounds: Aban – 14; Assists: Aban – 6
Jul 30	4:00 p.m.	San Sebastian Stags	Rizal Memorial Coliseum • Manila	L 68–72	4–3
Game Highs: Points: Aldave – 18; Rebounds: Mondragon – 11; Assists: Aban, Bautista – 5
4th place after the 1st round (4 wins–3 losses)
Second round of eliminations
Aug 6	4:00 p.m.	Benilde Blazers	Rizal Memorial Coliseum • Manila	W 90–76	5–3
Game Highs: Points: Andaya – 15; Rebounds: Mondragon – 11; Assists: Bautista, Enrile – 6
Aug 11	4:00 p.m.	JRU Heavy Bombers	Rizal Memorial Coliseum • Manila	W 87–84^{OT}	6–3
Game Highs: Points: Bautista – 19; Rebounds: Rodriguez – 10; Assists: Bautista, Enrile – 4
Aug 13	4:00 p.m.	Perpetual Altas	Rizal Memorial Coliseum • Manila	W 84–70	7–3
Game Highs: Points: Bautista – 20; Rebounds: Andaya – 10; Assists: Aban – 6
Aug 20	2:00 p.m.	Mapúa Cardinals	Rizal Memorial Coliseum • Manila	L 60–62	7–4
Game Highs: Points: Enrile – 14; Rebounds: Andaya – 12; Assists: Bautista, Aldave – 3
Aug 25	2:00 p.m.	San Beda Red Lions	Rizal Memorial Coliseum • Manila	W 79–70^{OT}	8–4
Game Highs: Points: Andaya – 25; Rebounds: Aban – 12; Assists: Bautista, Enrile – 5
Aug 27	2:00 p.m.	PCU Dolphins	Rizal Memorial Coliseum • Manila	L 77–80	8–5
Game Highs: Points: Andaya – 17; Rebounds: Andaya – 13; Assists: Enrile – 8
Sep 3	4:00 p.m.	San Sebastian Stags	Rizal Memorial Coliseum • Manila	W 81–78	9–5
Game Highs: Points: Aban – 20; Rebounds: Bautista, Pinera – 6; Assists: Bautista – 6
Third place at 9 wins–5 losses (5 wins–2 losses in the 2nd round)
Final Four (Note: PCU held a twice-to-beat advantage over Letran)
Sep 10	2:00 p.m.	PCU Dolphins	Araneta Coliseum • Quezon City	W 65–64	1–0 (10–5)
Game Highs: Points: Alcaraz – 15
Sep 15	2:00 p.m.	PCU Dolphins	Rizal Memorial Coliseum • Manila	L 80–85^{OT}	1–1 (10–6)
Game Highs: Points: Bautista, Aban – 15
Lost series in two games

Times listed above are in UTC+08:00

Source: ABS-CBN Pinoy Central
