= 2003 Letran Knights basketball team =

Philippine college basketball team

2003 Letran Knights men's basketball

NCAA Season 79 champions

Record
- Elims rank: #1
- Final rank: #1
- 2003 record: 12–6 (9–5 elims)
- Head coach: Louie Alas (3rd season)
- Captain: Ronjay Enrile (3rd season)

The 2003 Letran Knights men's basketball team represented Colegio de San Juan de Letran in the 79th season of the National Collegiate Athletic Association in the Philippines. The men's basketball tournament for the school year 2003-04 began on June 28, 2003, and the host school for the season was San Sebastian College – Recoletos.

The Knights finished the double round-robin eliminations at first place with 9 wins against 5 losses. They then eliminated the Mapúa Cardinals in the Final Four to advance in the finals and faced the hosts and two-time defending champions San Sebastian Stags.

The Knights went on to defeat the Stags in three games to capture their 15th NCAA championship, ending their three-year title drought. Ronjay Enrile was named Finals Most Valuable Player and member of the Mythical Five.

== Roster ==
Letran Knights roster
Players
Coaches

Pos.	No.	Nat.	Name	Height	Year	High School
C	4	(Philippines)	Caindoy, John Christopher	6'5" (1.96m)	1st	–
G	5	(Philippines)	Santos, Radjan Dale	5'10" (1.78m)	4th	Don Bosco Academy
G	6	(Philippines)	Fedelicio, Mark Anthony	5'8" (1.73m)	1st	Colegio de San Juan de Letran
G	7	(Philippines)	Balneg, Mark Anthony	6'2" (1.88m)	1st	Colegio de San Juan de Letran
G	8	(Philippines)	Bautista, Boyet	5'8" (1.73m)	2nd	Colegio de San Juan de Letran
G	9	(Philippines)	Enrile, Ronjay	5'11" (1.8m)	3rd	Colegio de San Juan de Letran
C	10	(Philippines)	Rodriguez, Frederick	6'4" (1.93m)	2nd	Bataan National High School of Arts and Trade
C	11	(Philippines)	Pinera, Jonathan	6'5" (1.96m)	1st	–
F	12	(Philippines)	Aldave, Jonathan	6'2" (1.88m)	2nd	San Andres Vocational School
C	13	(Philippines)	Reyes, Kristoffer	6'4" (1.93m)	4th	–
C	14	(Philippines)	Realista, Michael John	6'4" (1.93m)	1st	–
F	15	(Philippines)	Anabo, Billy Ray	6'2" (1.88m)	2nd	Colegio de San Juan de Letran
F	15	(Philippines)	Quinday, Andro Gil	6'2" (1.88m)	1st	–
F	17	(Philippines)	Aban, Aaron Abril	6'3" (1.91m)	2nd	Liceo de Cagayan University
F	18	(Philippines)	Ebajay, Norman	6'2" (1.88m)	2nd	Liceo de Cagayan University

Head coach

- Francisco Luis Alas

Team manager

- Ramon Oben

Legend

- (C) Team captain
- Injured

=== Depth chart ===
Pos.	Starting 5	Bench 1	Bench 2
C	Rodriguez	Reyes	Calindoy
PF	Pinera	Anabo	Ebajay
SF	Enrile	Aldave	Realista
SG	Aban	Santos	Quinday
PG	Bautista	Fedelicio	Balneg

== NCAA Season 79 games results ==
Elimination games were played in a double round-robin format. All games were aired on Studio 23.

Date	Time	Opponent	Venue	Result	Record
First round of eliminations
Jun 28	6:00 p.m.	Mapúa Cardinals	Araneta Coliseum • Quezon City	L 58–66	0–1
Game Highs: Points: Enrile – 20
Jul 4	4:00 p.m.	San Beda Red Lions	Rizal Memorial Coliseum • Manila	W 69–63	1–1
Jul 9	2:00 p.m.	Benilde Blazers	Rizal Memorial Coliseum • Manila	W 77–75	2–1
Jul 14	4:00 p.m.	San Sebastian Stags	Rizal Memorial Coliseum • Manila	W 73–64	3–1
Jul 16	4:00 p.m.	JRU Heavy Bombers	Rizal Memorial Coliseum • Manila	L 67–78	3–2
Jul 23	4:00 p.m.	Perpetual Altas	Rizal Memorial Coliseum • Manila	W 68–66	4–2
Jul 30	2:00 p.m.	PCU Dolphins	Rizal Memorial Coliseum • Manila	W 84–72	5–2
First place after 1st round (5 wins–2 losses)
Second round of eliminations
Aug 6	2:00 p.m.	Perpetual Altas	Rizal Memorial Coliseum • Manila	W 60–56	6–2
Aug 13	4:00 p.m.	Mapúa Cardinals	Rizal Memorial Coliseum • Manila	L 65–77	6–3
Aug 18	4:00 p.m.	San Beda Red Lions	Rizal Memorial Coliseum • Manila	W 76–65	7–3
Aug 22	4:00 p.m.	Benilde Blazers	Rizal Memorial Coliseum • Manila	L 72–90	7–4
Aug 27	4:00 p.m.	PCU Dolphins	Rizal Memorial Coliseum • Manila	W 94–90^{OT}	8–4
Game Highs: Points: Enrile – 36; Rebounds: Enrile – 9; Assists: Enrile – 9
Aug 29	2:00 p.m.	San Sebastian Stags	Rizal Memorial Coliseum • Manila	L 61–63	8–5
Sep 3	2:00 p.m.	JRU Heavy Bombers	Rizal Memorial Coliseum • Manila	W 80–78	9–5
Game Highs: Points: Aban – 20
First place at 9 wins–5 losses (4 wins–3 losses in the 2nd round) (Note: Head-to-head record: Letran 1-1 San Sebastian; Letran +7)
Final Four (Note: Letran held a twice-to-beat advantage over Mapúa)
Sep 10	2:00 p.m.	Mapúa Cardinals	Rizal Memorial Coliseum • Manila	W 72–66	1–0 (10–5)
Letran wins series in one game
Finals
Sep 17	4:00 p.m.	San Sebastian Stags	Rizal Memorial Coliseum • Manila	W 89–73	1–0 (11–5)
Game Highs: Points: Enrile – 24
Sep 19	4:00 p.m.	San Sebastian Stags	Rizal Memorial Coliseum • Manila	L 77–85	1–1 (11–6)
Game Highs: Points: Enrile – 22
Sep 24	3:00 p.m.	San Sebastian Stags	Cuneta Astrodome • Pasay	W 64–59	2–1 (12–6)
Game Highs: Points: Bautista, Enrile – 19; Rebounds: Rodriguez – 14
Knights clinched 15th NCAA championship

Times listed above are in UTC+08:00

Source: ABS-CBN Pinoy Central

== Awards ==
Player	Award
Ronjay Enrile	NCAA Finals Most Valuable Player
Ronjay Enrile	NCAA Mythical Five member

== Injuries ==
Letran forward Aaron Aban suffered a deep cut on his left knee when he slammed into a rolltec advertising streamer during a match against CSB Blazers in the first round. Aban underwent surgery and needed a month to recuperate.
