= 2006 Letran Knights basketball team =

2006 Letran Knights men's basketball

NCAA Season 82 semifinalist

Record
- Elims rank: #3
- Final rank: #3
- 2006 record: 10–6 (10–4 elims)
- Head coach: Louie Alas (6th season)
- Assistant coaches: Justino Pinat; Carmelo Alas; Elmer Latonio
- Captain: Boyet Bautista (5th season)

The 2006 Letran Knights men's basketball team represented Colegio de San Juan de Letran in the 82nd season of the National Collegiate Athletic Association in the Philippines. The men's basketball tournament for the school year 2006-07 began on June 24, 2006, and the host school for the season was De La Salle–College of Saint Benilde.

The Knights, the Season 81 champions, finished the double round-robin eliminations at third place with 10 wins against 4 losses. They were eliminated by PCU Dolphins in the Final Four.

== Roster ==
Letran Knights roster
Players
Coaches

Pos.	No.	Nat.	Name	Height	Year	High School
C	5	(Philippines)	Faundo, Bryan	6'6" (1.98m)	3rd	–
F	6	(Philippines)	Ranises, Regin	6'4" (1.93m)	1st	Holy Child School of Davao
G	7	(Philippines)	Balneg, Mark Anthony	6'2" (1.88m)	4th	Colegio de San Juan de Letran
G	8	(Philippines)	Bautista, Boyet (C)	5'8" (1.73m)	5th	Colegio de San Juan de Letran
C	9	(Philippines)	Foronda, John Julien	6'5" (1.96m)	1st	Benedictine International School
G	10	(Philippines)	Melegrito, John Carl	5'8" (1.73m)	2nd	Colegio de San Juan de Letran
G	11	(Philippines)	Del Rosario, Kirk	5'10" (1.78m)	1st	Colegio de San Juan de Letran
G	12	(Philippines)	Dangcal, Reynaldo Jr.	5'9" (1.75m)	1st	Colegio de San Juan de Letran
F	13	(Philippines)	Mondragon, Hafer	6'0" (1.83m)	4th	–
C	14	(Philippines)	Realista, Michael John	6'4" (1.93m)	4th	–
F	15	(Philippines)	Daa, Fiel Dino	6'2" (1.88m)	1st	Marasbaras National HS
F	16	(Philippines)	Quinday, Andro Gil	6'2" (1.88m)	4th	–
F	17	(Philippines)	Aban, Aaron Abril	6'3" (1.91m)	5th	Liceo de Cagayan University
F	18	(Philippines)	Guevarra, Rey Francis	6'2" (1.88m)	1st	Colegio de San Juan de Letran
G	20	(Philippines)	Jazul, Rafael Joey Jr.	5'11" (1.8m)	2nd	Colegio de San Juan de Letran

Head coach

- Francisco Luis Alas

Assistant coach(es)

- Carmelo Alas
- Elmer Latonio
- Justino Pinat

Team manager

- Ramon Oben

Legend

- (C) Team captain
- Injured

=== Depth chart ===
Pos.	Starting 5	Bench 1	Bench 2
C	Realista	Faundo	Foronda
PF	Quinday	Ranises	Guevarra
SF	Mondragon	Daa	Dangcal
SG	Aban	Jazul	Melegrito
PG	Bautista	Balneg	Del Rosario

== NCAA Season 82 games results ==
Elimination games were played in a double round-robin format. All games were aired on Studio 23.

Date	Time	Opponent	Venue	Result	Record
First round of eliminations
Jun 24	2:00 p.m.	Benilde Blazers	Araneta Coliseum • Quezon City	W 65–44	1–0
Game Highs: Points: Bautista – 16; Rebounds: Bautista – 8; Assists: Bautista, Dangcal – 4
Jul 3	1:30 p.m.	San Sebastian Stags	Ninoy Aquino Stadium • Manila	W 81–73	2–0
Game Highs: Points: Bautista – 16; Rebounds: Quinday – 7; Assists: Jazul – 3
Jul 5	2:00 p.m.	JRU Heavy Bombers	Ninoy Aquino Stadium • Manila	W 74–70	3–0
Jul 14	2:00 p.m.	PCU Dolphins	Ninoy Aquino Stadium • Manila	W 62–54	4–0
Jul 17	1:30 p.m.	Perpetual Altas	Ninoy Aquino Stadium • Manila	W 60–48	5–0
Jul 21	4:00 p.m.	Mapúa Cardinals	Ninoy Aquino Stadium • Manila	W 74–71	6–0
Jul 28	4:00 p.m.	San Beda Red Lions	Ninoy Aquino Stadium • Manila	L 49–57	6–1
1st place after the 1st round (6 wins–1 loss)
Second round of eliminations
Aug 2	4:00 p.m.	Benilde Blazers	Ninoy Aquino Stadium • Manila	W 71–63	7–1
Aug 7	2:00 p.m.	Perpetual Altas	Ninoy Aquino Stadium • Manila	W 66–54	8–1
Aug 11	2:00 p.m.	JRU Heavy Bombers	Ninoy Aquino Stadium • Manila	W 70–55	9–1
Aug 16	2:00 p.m.	San Sebastian Stags	Rizal Memorial Coliseum • Manila	W 62–56	10–1
Aug 23	2:00 p.m.	Mapúa Cardinals	Ninoy Aquino Stadium • Manila	L 49–54	10–2
Aug 25	2:00 p.m.	PCU Dolphins	Rizal Memorial Coliseum • Manila	L 48–59	10–3
Sep 6	4:00 p.m.	San Beda Red Lions	Araneta Coliseum • Quezon City	L 44–54	10–4
Tied for 2nd place at 10 wins–4 losses (4 wins–3 losses in the 2nd round)
2nd seed Playoff
Sep 8	4:00 p.m.	PCU Dolphins	Araneta Coliseum • Quezon City	L 62–67	0–1 (10–5)
Game Highs: Points: Balneg – 15
Lost the twice-to-beat advantage to PCU
Final Four (Note: PCU held a twice-to-beat advantage over Letran)
Sep 13	4:00 p.m.	PCU Dolphins	Araneta Coliseum • Quezon City	L 50–72	0–1 (10–6)
Game Highs: Points: Bautista – 16
Lost series in one game

Times listed above are in UTC+08:00

Source: NCAA.org.ph

== Awards ==
Player	Award
Boyet Bautista	NCAA Most Improved Player

== Players drafted to the PBA ==
Year	Round	Pick	Overall	Player	PBA team
2006	1	7	7	Aaron Aban	Alaska Aces
2006	1	9	9	Boyet Bautista	Purefoods Chunkee Giants
