= 2002 Letran Knights basketball team =

Philippine college basketball team

2002 Letran Knights men's basketball

Record
- Elims rank: #6
- Final rank: #6
- 2002 record: 7–7
- Head coach: Louie Alas (2nd season)
- Captain: –

The 2002 Letran Knights men's basketball team represented Colegio de San Juan de Letran in the 78th season of the National Collegiate Athletic Association in the Philippines. The men's basketball tournament for the school year 2002-03 began on June 29, 2002, and the host school for the season was San Beda College.

This season marked the return of Louie Alas as head coach of the Knights after his stints in Manila Metrostars of the Metropolitan Basketball Association and the Mobiline Phone Pals of the Philippine Basketball Association. Louie Alas debuted with the Knights and won his first NCAA championship, giving Letran its 13th NCAA men's basketball title, back in 1998 before he went in the MBA.

The Knights finished the season at sixth place with 7 wins against 7 losses, missing the Final Four for three consecutive years since winning back-to-back titles in 1998 and 1999.

== Roster ==
Letran Knights roster
Players
Coaches

Pos.	No.	Nat.	Name	Height	Year	High School
F	4	(Philippines)	Syhongpan, Amiel Reinhard	6'4" (1.93m)	3rd	–
G	5	(Philippines)	Santos, Radjan Dale	5'10" (1.78m)	3rd	Don Bosco Academy
G	6	(Philippines)	Sangco, John	5'8" (1.73m)	2nd	University of Santo Tomas
C	7	(United States)	Edwards, Regile Joseph	6'7" (2.01m)	1st	Polytechnic High School
G	8	(Philippines)	Bautista, Boyet	5'8" (1.73m)	1st	Colegio de San Juan de Letran
G	9	(Philippines)	Enrile, Ronjay	5'11" (1.8m)	2nd	Colegio de San Juan de Letran
C	10	(Philippines)	Rodriguez, Frederick	6'4" (1.93m)	1st	Bataan National High School of Arts and Trade
F	11	(Philippines)	Sillona, Gian Carlo	6'2" (1.88m)	3rd	La Salle Greenhills
F	12	(Philippines)	Aldave, Jonathan	6'2" (1.88m)	1st	San Andres Vocational School
C	13	(Philippines)	Reyes, Kristoffer Alriches	6'4" (1.93m)	4th	–
F	14	(Philippines)	Santa Cruz, Harold	6'3" (1.91m)	3rd	Colegio de San Juan de Letran
G	15	(Philippines)	Anabo, Billy Ray	6'2" (1.88m)	1st	Colegio de San Juan de Letran
F	16	(Philippines)	Ang, Kelwin	5'10" (1.78m)	1st	University of Santo Tomas
F	17	(Philippines)	Aban, Aaron Abril	6'3" (1.91m)	1st	Liceo de Cagayan University
F	18	(Philippines)	Ebajay, Norman	6'2" (1.88m)	1st	Liceo de Cagayan University

Head coach

- Francisco Luis Alas

Assistant coach(es)

- Dayong Mendoza
- Ceasar Polhen
- Carmelo Alas
- Bernard Ramos

Team manager

- Ramon Oben

Legend

- (C) Team captain
- Injured

=== Depth chart ===
Pos.	Starting 5	Bench 1	Bench 2
C	Santa Cruz	Rodriguez	Edwards
PF	Sillona	Reyes	Ebajay
SF	Aldave	Syhongpan	Anabo
SG	Enrile	Aban	Ang
PG	Santos	Bautista	Sangco

== NCAA Season 78 games results ==
Elimination games were played in a double round-robin format. All games were aired on Studio 23.

Date	Time	Opponent	Venue	Result	Record
First round of eliminations
Jun 29	4:00 p.m.	San Beda Red Lions	Araneta Coliseum • Quezon City	W 69–64	1–0
Game Highs: Points: Enrile – 22; Rebounds: Santa Cruz – 15; Assists: Enrile – 8
Jul 5	2:00 p.m.	PCU Dolphins	Rizal Memorial Coliseum • Manila	L 56–67	1–1
Game Highs: Points: Enrile – 18; Rebounds: Aban – 10; Assists: Enrile – 6
Jul 17	2:00 p.m.	Perpetual Altas	Rizal Memorial Coliseum • Manila	W 76–68	2–1
Game Highs: Points: Aldave – 23; Rebounds: Santa Cruz – 9; Assists: 5 players – 3
Jul 22	2:00 p.m.	Benilde Blazers	Rizal Memorial Coliseum • Manila	L 75–88	2–2
Game Highs: Points: Aldave – 22; Rebounds: Santa Cruz – 10; Assists: Enrile, Aban, Anabo – 3
Jul 26	4:00 p.m.	Mapúa Cardinals	Rizal Memorial Coliseum • Manila	W 76–73	3–2
Game Highs: Points: Enrile – 24; Rebounds: Santa Cruz – 9; Assists: Enrile – 7
Aug 2	4:00 p.m.	JRU Heavy Bombers	Rizal Memorial Coliseum • Manila	L 96–100^{OT}	3–3
Game Highs: Points: Enrile – 26; Rebounds: Santa Cruz – 13; Assists: Enrile, Santos – 6
Aug 5	4:00 p.m.	San Sebastian Stags	Rizal Memorial Coliseum • Manila	L 62–72	3–4
Game Highs: Points: Santa Cruz – 14; Rebounds: Santa Cruz – 9; Assists: Bautista, Enrile – 4
4th place after 1st round (3 wins–4 losses)
Second round of eliminations
Aug 9	4:00 p.m.	JRU Heavy Bombers	Rizal Memorial Coliseum • Manila	L 76–80	3–5
Game Highs: Points: Aldave, Bautista, Santa Cruz – 14; Rebounds: Santa Cruz – 14; Assists: Santos – 4
Aug 14	4:00 p.m.	PCU Dolphins	Rizal Memorial Coliseum • Manila	W 83–73^{OT}	4–5
Game Highs: Points: Enrile – 23
Aug 19	2:00 p.m.	San Sebastian Stags	Rizal Memorial Coliseum • Manila	L 59–74	4–6
Game Highs: Points: Enrile – 14; Rebounds: Sillona – 9; Assists: Bautista – 4
Aug 23	4:00 p.m.	San Beda Red Lions	Rizal Memorial Coliseum • Manila	W 67–54	5–6
Game Highs: Points: Enrile – 20; Rebounds: Ebajay – 10; Assists: Aldave, Enrile, Santos – 3
Aug 28	2:00 p.m.	Perpetual Altas	Rizal Memorial Coliseum • Manila	W 70–64	6–6
Sep 2	2:00 p.m.	Benilde Blazers	Rizal Memorial Coliseum • Manila	W 85–80	7–6
Game Highs: Points: Bautista, Enrile – 23; Rebounds: Santa Cruz – 10; Assists: Enrile – 6
Sep 4	2:00 p.m.	Mapúa Cardinals	Rizal Memorial Coliseum • Manila	L 71–80	7–7
Game Highs: Points: Enrile – 17; Rebounds: Santa Cruz – 7; Assists: Bautista, Enrile – 5
Sixth place at 7 wins–7 losses (4 wins–3 losses in the 2nd round)

Times listed above are in UTC+08:00

Source: ABS-CBN Pinoy Central
