= 2008 Letran Knights basketball team =

2008 Letran Knights men's basketball

NCAA Season 84 semifinalist

Record
- Elims rank: #3
- Final rank: #3
- 2008 record: 10–7 (9–5 elims)
- Head coach: Louie Alas (8th season)
- Assistant coaches: Justino Pinat; Carmelo Alas; Elmer Latonio
- Captain: RJ Jazul (4th season)

The 2008 Letran Knights men's basketball team represented Colegio de San Juan de Letran in the 84th season of the National Collegiate Athletic Association in the Philippines. The men's basketball tournament for the school year 2008-09 began on June 28, 2008, and the host school for the season was Mapúa Institute of Technology.

The Knights, after finishing the double round-robin eliminations with 9 wins against 5 losses, underwent a series of classification matches before landing at third place. In a tight race for the Final Four, four teams including the Knights, were tied from 2nd to 5th place. Letran beat the hosts Mapúa in the classification round, advancing in the second-seed playoff and a virtual best-of-three series against JRU. In the next round, the Heavy Bombers manhandled the Knights 69–53. In the Final Four, the Knights were eliminated by JRU in one game. Letran star shooting guard RJ Jazul was named one of the Mythical Five members.

== Roster ==
Letran Knights roster
Players
Coaches

Pos.	No.	Nat.	Name	Height	Year	High School
F	4	(Philippines)	Lacamento, Raydhan	–	1st	–
C	5	(Philippines)	Cortes, Jamieson II	6'4" (1.93m)	1st	–
G	6	(Philippines)	Gutilban, Reymar	5'10" (1.78m)	3rd	Aquinas School
F	8	(United States)	Cabonce, Alvyn	6'4" (1.93m)	2nd	Nile C. Kinnick High School
G	9	(Philippines)	Latonio, Anjoe Dace	–	2nd	Colegio de San Juan de Letran
G	10	(Philippines)	Melegrito, John Carl	5'9" (1.75m)	4th	Colegio de San Juan de Letran
G	11	(Philippines)	Del Rosario, Kirk	5'10" (1.78m)	3rd	Colegio de San Juan de Letran
G	12	(Philippines)	Dangcal, Reynaldo Jr.	5'9" (1.75m)	3rd	Colegio de San Juan de Letran
G	13	(Philippines)	Jazul, Rafael Joey Jr. (C)	5'11" (1.8m)	4th	Colegio de San Juan de Letran
C	14	(Philippines)	Foronda, John Clarence	6'5" (1.96m)	2nd	–
F	15	(Philippines)	Daa, Fiel Dino	6'2" (1.88m)	3rd	Marasbaras National HS
F	16	(Philippines)	Belencion, Jaypee	6'3" (1.91m)	1st	Hua Siong College of Iloilo
F	17	(Philippines)	Ranises, Regin	6'4" (1.93m)	3rd	Holy Child School of Davao
F	18	(Philippines)	Guevarra, Rey Francis	6'2" (1.88m)	3rd	Colegio de San Juan de Letran
C	19	(Philippines)	Foronda, John Julien	6'5" (1.96m)	3rd	Benedictine International School

Head coach

- Francisco Luis Alas

Assistant coach(es)

- Carmelo Alas
- Elmer Latonio
- Justino Pinat

Team manager

- Ramon Oben

Legend

- (C) Team captain
- Injured

=== Depth chart ===
Pos.	Starting 5	Bench 1	Bench 2
C	Foronda, J	Cortes	Ranises
PF	Daa	Cabonce	Foronda, C
SF	Guevarra	Dangcal	Lacamento
SG	Jazul	Gutilban	Belencion
PG	Del Rosario	Melegrito	Latonio

== NCAA Season 84 games results ==
Elimination games were played in a double round-robin format. All games were aired on Studio 23.

Date	Time	Opponent	Venue	Result	Record
First round of eliminations
Jun 28	4:00 p.m.	JRU Heavy Bombers	Araneta Coliseum • Quezon City	W 83–69	1–0
Jul 4	2:00 p.m.	Benilde Blazers	Cuneta Astrodome • Pasay	W 88–75	2–0
Jul 11	2:00 p.m.	PCU Dolphins	Cuneta Astrodome • Pasay	W 73–62	3–0
Jul 16	2:00 p.m.	San Sebastian Stags	Cuneta Astrodome • Pasay	W 71–67	4–0
Jul 18	4:00 p.m.	Perpetual Altas	Cuneta Astrodome • Pasay	W 63–62	5–0
Jul 23	4:00 p.m.	Mapúa Cardinals	Cuneta Astrodome • Pasay	W 67–60	6–0
Jul 30	4:00 p.m.	San Beda Red Lions	Cuneta Astrodome • Pasay	L 67–71	6–1
1st place after the 1st round (6 wins–1 loss)
Second round of eliminations
Aug 6	2:00 p.m.	Benilde Blazers	Cuneta Astrodome • Pasay	W 90–65	7–1
Aug 15	4:00 p.m.	JRU Heavy Bombers	Cuneta Astrodome • Pasay	L 72–76	7–2
Aug 20	4:00 p.m.	San Sebastian Stags	Cuneta Astrodome • Pasay	L 73–76	7–3
Aug 25	2:00 p.m.	Perpetual Altas	Cuneta Astrodome • Pasay	W 74–66	8–3
Aug 29	2:00 p.m.	Mapúa Cardinals	Cuneta Astrodome • Pasay	L 52–69	8–4
Sep 5	2:00 p.m.	PCU Dolphins	Cuneta Astrodome • Pasay	W 60–54	9–4
Sep 10	4:00 p.m.	San Beda Red Lions	Araneta Coliseum • Quezon City	L 63–65	9–5
Tied for 2nd–5th place at 9 wins–5 losses (3 wins–4 losses in the 2nd round)
Classification round
Sep 15	4:00 p.m.	Mapúa Cardinals	Cuneta Astrodome • Pasay	W 62–52	1–0 (10–5)
Game Highs: Points: Daa – 24
Advanced to second-seed playoff
2nd seed Playoff
Sep 17	4:00 p.m.	JRU Heavy Bombers	Cuneta Astrodome • Pasay	L 53–69	0–1 (10–6)
Game Highs: Points: Cortes, Jazul – 9; Rebounds: Daa – 11
Lost the twice-to-beat advantage to JRU
Final Four (Note: JRU held a twice-to-beat advantage over Letran)
Sep 19	4:00 p.m.	JRU Heavy Bombers	Cuneta Astrodome • Pasay	L 61–63	0–1 (10–7)
Game Highs: Points: Jazul – 17; Rebounds: Jazul – 4
Lost series in one game

Times listed above are in UTC+08:00

Source: Ubelt.com

== Awards ==
Player	Award
RJ Jazul	NCAA Mythical Five member
RJ Jazul	Player of the Week — June 28–July 6
