= 2005 Letran Knights basketball team =

2005 Letran Knights men's basketball

NCAA Season 81 champions

Record
- Elims rank: #1
- Final rank: #1
- 2005 record: 16–2 (13–1 elims)
- Head coach: Louie Alas (5th season)
- Assistant coaches: Justino Pinat; Carmelo Alas
- Captain: Frederick Rodriguez (4th season)

The 2005 Letran Knights men's basketball team represented Colegio de San Juan de Letran in the 81st season of the National Collegiate Athletic Association in the Philippines. The men's basketball tournament for the school year 2005-06 began on June 25, 2005, and the host school for the season was also Letran.

The Knights, after a disappointing Season 80 campaign, finished the double round-robin eliminations at first place with 13 wins against 1 loss. They then eliminated San Sebastian Stags in the Final Four to face their Season 80 Final Four tormentors, the PCU Dolphins, in the Finals.

The Knights went on to defeat the Dolphins in three games to capture their 16th NCAA championship. Boyet Bautista was named Finals Most Valuable Player and Aaron Aban was named Most Improved Player of the season.

== Roster ==
Letran Knights roster
Players
Coaches

Pos.	No.	Nat.	Name	Height	Year	High School
G	4	(Philippines)	Alcaraz, John Paul	5'11" (1.8m)	2nd	–
C	5	(Philippines)	Faundo, Bryan	6'6" (1.98m)	2nd	–
C	6	(Philippines)	Andaya, Mark Anthony	6'7" (2.01m)	2nd	Adamson University
G	7	(Philippines)	Balneg, Mark Anthony	6'2" (1.88m)	3rd	Colegio de San Juan de Letran
G	8	(Philippines)	Bautista, Boyet	5'8" (1.73m)	4th	Colegio de San Juan de Letran
G	9	(Philippines)	Melegrito, John Carl	5'8" (1.73m)	1st	Colegio de San Juan de Letran
C	10	(Philippines)	Rodriguez, Frederick (C)	6'4" (1.93m)	4th	Bataan National High School of Arts and Trade
C	11	(Philippines)	Pinera, Jonathan	6'5" (1.96m)	3rd	–
—	12	(Philippines)	Aldave, Jonathan	6'2" (1.88m)	4th	San Andres Vocational School
C	14	(Philippines)	Realista, Michael John	6'4" (1.93m)	3rd	–
F	15	(Philippines)	Anabo, Billy Ray	6'2" (1.88m)	4th	Colegio de San Juan de Letran
F	16	(Philippines)	Quinday, Andro Gil	6'2" (1.88m)	3rd	–
F	17	(Philippines)	Aban, Aaron Abril	6'3" (1.91m)	4th	Liceo de Cagayan University
F	19	(Philippines)	Mondragon, Hafer	6'0" (1.83m)	1st	–
G	20	(Philippines)	Jazul, Rafael Joey Jr.	5'11" (1.8m)	1st	Colegio de San Juan de Letran

Head coach

- Francisco Luis Alas

Assistant coach(es)

- Carmelo Alas
- Justino Pinat

Team manager

- Ramon Oben

Legend

- (C) Team captain
- Injured

=== Depth chart ===
Pos.	Starting 5	Bench 1	Bench 2
C	Andaya	Pinera	Faundo
PF	Rodriguez	Realista	Quinday
SF	Aldave	Mondragon	Anabo
SG	Aban	Aldave	Jazul
PG	Bautista	Alcaraz	Balneg

== NCAA Season 81 games results ==
Elimination games were played in a double round-robin format. All games were aired on Studio 23.

Date	Time	Opponent	Venue	Result	Record
First round of eliminations
Jun 25	4:00 p.m.	Perpetual Altas	Araneta Coliseum • Quezon City	W 63–54	1–0
Game Highs: Points: Alcaraz – 13; Rebounds: Bautista – 7; Assists: Alcaraz – 6
Jun 29	4:00 p.m.	San Beda Red Lions	Cuneta Astrodome • Pasay	W 63–54	2–0
Game Highs: Points: Alcaraz – 13; Rebounds: Bautista – 7; Assists: Bautista – 4
Jul 4	1:00 p.m.	San Sebastian Stags	Cuneta Astrodome • Pasay	W 78–65	3–0
Game Highs: Points: Alcaraz – 21; Rebounds: Andaya – 8; Assists: Aldave – 5
Jul 8	4:00 p.m.	JRU Heavy Bombers	Cuneta Astrodome • Pasay	W 65–50	4–0
Jul 15	2:00 p.m.	Benilde Blazers	Cuneta Astrodome • Pasay	W 65–45	5–0
Game Highs: Points: Andaya – 15; Rebounds: Andaya – 12; Assists: 5 players – 2
Jul 20	4:00 p.m.	Mapúa Cardinals	Cuneta Astrodome • Pasay	W 69–67	6–0
Game Highs: Points: Aldave – 14; Rebounds: Andaya – 10; Assists: Alcaraz – 4
Jul 27	2:00 p.m.	PCU Dolphins	Cuneta Astrodome • Pasay	W 70–64^{OT}	7–0
Game Highs: Points: Aban – 17; Rebounds: Aban – 11; Assists: 5 players – 2
1st place after 1st round (7 wins–0 losses)
Second round of eliminations
Aug 3	4:00 p.m.	JRU Heavy Bombers	Cuneta Astrodome • Pasay	W 63–58	8–0
Game Highs: Points: Bautista – 13; Rebounds: Aban – 10; Assists: Bautista – 4
Aug 8	1:00 p.m.	Perpetual Altas	Cuneta Astrodome • Pasay	W 59–51	9–0
Game Highs: Points: Aban – 14; Rebounds: Rodriguez – 7; Assists: Bautista – 4
Aug 12	2:00 p.m.	San Beda Red Lions	Cuneta Astrodome • Pasay	W 68–58	10–0
Game Highs: Points: Rodriguez – 18; Rebounds: Andaya – 10; Assists: Bautista – 5
Aug 17	4:00 p.m.	Benilde Blazers	Cuneta Astrodome • Pasay	W 79–67	11–0
Game Highs: Points: Aban – 23; Rebounds: Andaya – 13; Assists: Aban, Bautista – 4
Aug 24	4:00 p.m.	Mapúa Cardinals	Cuneta Astrodome • Pasay	L 66–71	11–1
Game Highs: Points: Bautista – 15; Rebounds: Aban – 11; Assists: Bautista – 4
Aug 31	2:00 p.m.	San Sebastian Stags	Cuneta Astrodome • Pasay	W 65–46	12–1
Game Highs: Points: Aldave – 16; Rebounds: Andaya – 7; Assists: 6 players – 2
Sep 2	4:00 p.m.	PCU Dolphins	Cuneta Astrodome • Pasay	W 63–59	13–1
Game Highs: Points: Aldave – 15; Rebounds: Andaya – 11; Assists: Bautista – 4
1st place at 13 wins–1 losses (6 wins–1 loss in the 2nd round)
Final Four (Note: Letran held a twice-to-beat advantage over San Sebastian)
Sep 9	2:00 p.m.	San Sebastian Stags	Cuneta Astrodome • Pasay	W 93–60	1–0 (14–1)
Game Highs: Points: Aban – 21
Letran wins series in one game
Finals
Sep 19	4:00 p.m.	PCU Dolphins	Araneta Coliseum • Quezon City	L 74–79	0–1 (14–2)
Sep 21	4:00 p.m.	PCU Dolphins	Araneta Coliseum • Quezon City	W 78–60	1–1 (15–2)
Sep 23	3:00 p.m.	PCU Dolphins	Araneta Coliseum • Quezon City	W 62–54	2–1 (16–2)
Game Highs: Points: Aban, Alcaraz, Bautista – 13
Knights clinched 16th NCAA championship

Times listed above are in UTC+08:00

Source: NCAA.org.ph

== Awards ==
=== NCAA Individual Awards ===
Player	Award
Boyet Bautista	NCAA Finals Most Valuable Player
Aaron Aban	NCAA Most Improved Player

=== NCAA Players of the Week ===
Player	Award
Aaron Aban	Player of the Week — July 4–10
Jonathan Aldave	Player of the Week — July 18–24
JP Alcaraz	Player of the Week — July 25–31
Boyet Bautista	Player of the Week — August 8–14
Boyet Bautista	Player of the Week — September 19–25
Mark Andaya	Player of the Week — August 29–September 4
