= 2009 Letran Knights basketball team =

Philippine Basketball team

2009 Letran Knights men's basketball

NCAA Season 85 semifinalist

Record
- Elims rank: #4
- Final rank: #4
- 2009 record: 12–7 (12–6 elims)
- Head coach: Louie Alas (9th season)
- Assistant coaches: Justino Pinat; Carmelo Alas; Elmer Latonio
- Captain: RJ Jazul (5th season)

The 2009 Letran Knights men's basketball team represented Colegio de San Juan de Letran in the 85th season of the National Collegiate Athletic Association in the Philippines. The men's basketball tournament for the school year 2009-10 began on June 27, 2009, and the host school for the season was San Beda College.

The Knights finished the double round-robin eliminations at fourth place with 12 wins against 6 losses. In the Final Four, the Knights, holding a twice-to-beat disadvantage, were eliminated by the defending champions San Beda Red Lions in one game.

== Roster ==
Letran Knights roster
Players
Coaches

Pos.	No.	Nat.	Name	Height	Year	High School
G	4	(Philippines)	Malabago, Fredrick	5'11" (1.8m)	1st	–
C	5	(Philippines)	Cortes, Jamieson II	6'4" (1.93m)	2nd	–
G	6	(Philippines)	Alas, Kevin Louie	5'11" (1.8m)	1st	Colegio de San Juan de Letran
F	7	(Philippines)	Alas, Kristoffer Louie	6'3" (1.91m)	1st	Colegio de San Juan de Letran
G	8	(Liberia)	Taplah, Aloysius Trueh	5'9" (1.75m)	1st	Christian School International
G	9	(Philippines)	Gutilban, Reymar	5'11" (1.8m)	4th	Aquinas School
C	10	(Philippines)	Datang, Jomar	6'5" (1.96m)	1st	–
G	11	(Philippines)	Del Rosario, Kirk	5'10" (1.78m)	4th	Colegio de San Juan de Letran
G	12	(Philippines)	Pantin, Ramon Andrei	6'0" (1.83m)	1st	St. Joseph School
G	13	(Philippines)	Jazul, Rafael Joey Jr. (C)	5'11" (1.8m)	5th	Colegio de San Juan de Letran
G	14	(Philippines)	Ang, Patrick Nelzen	6'0" (1.83m)	1st	–
F	15	(Philippines)	Publico, Reynaldo Jr.	6'2" (1.88m)	1st	–
F	16	(Philippines)	Belencion, Jaypee	6'3" (1.91m)	2nd	Hua Siong College of Iloilo
F	18	(Philippines)	Guevarra, Rey Francis (injured)	6'2" (1.88m)	4th	Colegio de San Juan de Letran
C	19	(Philippines)	Foronda, John Julien	6'6" (1.98m)	4th	Benedictine International School

Head coach

- Francisco Luis Alas

Assistant coach(es)

- Carmelo Alas
- Elmer Latonio
- Justino Pinat

Team manager

- Ramon Oben

Legend

- (C) Team captain
- Injured

=== Depth chart ===
Pos.	Starting 5	Bench 1	Bench 2
C	Foronda	Alas, J	Datang
PF	Cortes	Belencion	Publico
SF	Guevarra	Pantin	Ang
SG	Jazul	Alas, K	Taplah
PG	Del Rosario	Gutilban	Malabago

== NCAA Season 85 games results ==
Elimination games were played in a double round-robin format. All games were aired on Studio 23.

Date	Time	Opponent	Venue	Result	Record
First round of eliminations
Jun 27	4:00 p.m.	JRU Heavy Bombers	Araneta Coliseum • Quezon City	L 66–69	0–1
Game Highs: Points: Jazul – 15; Rebounds: Cortes – 9; Assists: Jazul – 4
Jul 1	4:00 p.m.	Arellano Chiefs	Filoil Flying V Arena • San Juan	L 73–81	0–2
Game Highs: Points: Guevarra – 17; Rebounds: Cortes – 9; Assists: Jazul – 5
Jul 8	2:00 p.m.	Perpetual Altas	Filoil Flying V Arena • San Juan	W 73–68	1–2
Game Highs: Points: Jazul – 24; Rebounds: Cortes – 10; Assists: Del Rosario – 5
Jul 13	4:00 p.m.	Mapúa Cardinals	Filoil Flying V Arena • San Juan	W 73–51	2–2
Game Highs: Points: Guevarra – 18; Rebounds: Cortes – 10; Assists: Del Rosario – 5
Jul 20	2:00 p.m.	Benilde Blazers	Filoil Flying V Arena • San Juan	W 86–69	3–2
Game Highs: Points: Jazul – 16; Rebounds: Foronda, Guevarra – 8; Assists: Jazul – 5
Jul 24	2:00 p.m.	San Beda Red Lions	Filoil Flying V Arena • San Juan	L 74–79	3–3
Game Highs: Points: Jazul – 19; Rebounds: Foronda – 7; Assists: Del Rosario – 5
Jul 29	2:00 p.m.	AUF Great Danes	Filoil Flying V Arena • San Juan	W 94–64	4–3
Game Highs: Points: Guevarra – 16; Rebounds: Datang – 7; Assists: Ke. Alas – 6
Aug 5	4:00 p.m.	EAC Generals	Filoil Flying V Arena • San Juan	W 85–84	5–3
Game Highs: Points: Jazul – 26; Rebounds: Datang – 17; Assists: Ke. Alas – 5
Aug 14	4:00 p.m.	San Sebastian Stags	Filoil Flying V Arena • San Juan	L 74–77	5–4
Game Highs: Points: Belencion – 18; Rebounds: Cortes – 9; Assists: Jazul – 7
5th place after the 1st round (5 wins–4 losses)
Second round of eliminations
Aug 19	2:00 p.m.	EAC Generals	Filoil Flying V Arena • San Juan	W 92–66	6–4
Game Highs: Points: Guevarra, Jazul – 21; Rebounds: Del Rosario – 6; Assists: Jazul – 13
Aug 24	4:00 p.m.	Mapúa Cardinals	Filoil Flying V Arena • San Juan	W 70–65	7–4
Game Highs: Points: Guevarra – 18; Rebounds: Cortes – 11; Assists: 4 players – 2
Aug 28	4:00 p.m.	Arellano Chiefs	Filoil Flying V Arena • San Juan	W 89–85	8–4
Game Highs: Points: Guevarra, Jazul – 18; Rebounds: Foronda – 7; Assists: Jazul – 5
Sep 2	4:00 p.m.	Benilde Blazers	Filoil Flying V Arena • San Juan	W 69–54	9–4
Game Highs: Points: Guevarra – 22; Rebounds: Foronda – 8; Assists: Jazul – 6
Sep 7	2:00 p.m.	AUF Great Danes	Filoil Flying V Arena • San Juan	W 100–83	10–4
Game Highs: Points: Guevarra – 26; Rebounds: Kr. Alas – 8; Assists: Ke. Alas – 5
Sep 11	4:00 p.m.	JRU Heavy Bombers	Filoil Flying V Arena • San Juan	L 66–84	10–5
Game Highs: Points: Jazul – 14; Rebounds: Foronda – 6; Assists: Jazul – 5
Sep 16	2:00 p.m.	Perpetual Altas	Filoil Flying V Arena • San Juan	W 80–60	11–5
Game Highs: Points: Ke. Alas – 19; Rebounds: Cortes – 11; Assists: Del Rosario, Jazul – 3
Sep 25	4:00 p.m.	San Sebastian Stags	Filoil Flying V Arena • San Juan	W 80–63	12–5
Game Highs: Points: Guevarra, Jazul – 27; Rebounds: Cortes – 10; Assists: Gutilban – 4
Oct 2	4:00 p.m.	San Beda Red Lions	Filoil Flying V Arena • San Juan	L 64–76	12–6
4th place at 12 wins–6 losses (7 wins–2 losses in the 2nd round)
Final Four (Note: San Beda held a twice-to-beat advantage over Letran)
Oct 16	2:00 p.m.	San Beda Red Lions	Filoil Flying V Arena • San Juan	L 76–82	0–1 (12–7)
Game Highs: Points: Ke. Alas – 24
Lost series in one game

Times listed above are in UTC+08:00

Source: inboundPASS

== Suspensions ==
The NCAA Management Committee, led by acting chairman Mr. Frank Gusi of San Sebastian College, announced the suspension of Letran forwards Kristoffer Alas and Jaypee Belencion. After the first round game of Letran and San Beda which resulted in a debris-pelting and bench-clearing incident, Letran's Kris Alas pushed San Beda center Sudan Daniel right after the endgame buzzer, while Belencion was sacked after he taunted the fans which the league considered as mitigating circumstances.

The league also gave a stern warning to Letran head coach Louie Alas, his assistant Mel Alas, and Letran shooting guard Kevin Alas for their misconduct.

== Injuries ==
Letran star forward Rey Guevarra tore his anterior cruciate ligament (ACL) when he took a bad fall after colliding against San Beda center Sudan Daniel in the dying seconds of the second-round encounter between the Knights and Red Lions.

== Awards ==
Player	Award
RJ Jazul	Players of the Week — September 20–26
Rey Guevarra	Players of the Week — September 20–26
