= Louie Alas =

Filipino basketball player and coach (born 1963)

Ateneo Blue Eagles
- Position: Head coach
- League: UAAP

Personal information
- Born: October 10, 1963 (age 63) Unisan, Quezon, Philippines

Career information
- College: Adamson
- PBA draft: 1990: 3rd round, 21st overall pick
- Drafted by: Purefoods Hotdogs
- Coaching career: 1997–present

Career history

Coaching
- 1997–1998: Purefoods Corned Beef (assistant)
- 1998: Letran
- 1999: Manila Metrostars
- 2000: Mobiline Phone Pals (assistant)
- 2000–2001: Mobiline/Talk 'n Text Phone Pals
- 2002–2012: Letran
- 2009–2011: Philippine Patriots
- 2012–2017: Alaska Aces (assistant)
- 2017–2020: Phoenix Super LPG Fuel Masters
- 2023–2024: Zamboanga Master Sardines
- 2024–2026: Ateneo (assistant)
- 2026–present: Ateneo (interim)

Career highlights
- As head coach: MBA champion (1999); 3× NCAA champion (1998, 2003, 2005); As assistant coach: 2× PBA champion (1997 All-Filipino, 2013 Commissioner's)
Medals
Men's basketball
Head Coach for Philippines
SEA Games
Gold medal – first place	1999 Brunei	Team

Francisco Luis Evora Alas (born October 10, 1963) is a Filipino basketball coach. He is the interim head coach of the Ateneo Blue Eagles basketball team of the University Athletic Association of the Philippines (UAAP). Alas was the former head coach of the Letran Knights in the National Collegiate Athletic Association, and Philippine Patriots in the ASEAN Basketball League. He was also a former coach of Mobiline from 2000 to 2001 in the Philippine Basketball Association (PBA).

== Playing career ==
Alas' basketball career began in Adamson University in the University Athletic Association of the Philippines where he played for the school's team Adamson Falcons. In the PABL, he played for ESQ, Purefoods, Philips Sardines and Burger Machine.

== Coaching career ==
His first coaching job was with the Saint Francis of Assisi Baby Doves in Las Piñas. Afterwards, he moved to Las Piñas College. For a time, Alas used to be an assistant coach in Adamson University.

=== Professional ===
He had started as an assistant coach for Purefoods Corned Beef Cowboys under Eric Altamirano from 1997 to 1998. Later on, he transferred to the now-defunct Metropolitan Basketball Association.

Alas was supposed to handle another MBA team, the Batangas Blades when the PBA's Mobiline Phone Pals gave him an offer a chance to coach, and immediately took it. Prior to this, Mobiline was struggling under Eric Altamirano who have been fired together with the whole coaching staff. While in the PBA, he led the Phone Pals to its best record in the elimination phase of the Governor's Cup in 2000 and 2001 but all ended up losing in the semis. The Pop Cola Panthers was the first PBA team to offer him a coaching job but decided to stick with the Metrostars.

==== Controversy ====
However, before the 2002 season, Alas was fired from the team. According to reports, Alas angered top Mobiline officials when he chose Gilbert Demape over John Arigo as the team's top rookie draft pick. But he denied this allegation, saying that he had a series of meetings with the owners, and was given the freedom to decide on what he felt was best for the team. On December 3, 2001, Mobiline announced that Alas had stepped down as the team's head coach.

Alas was replaced by American Bill Bayno who immediately received heavy criticism from the nationalist Basketball Coaches Association of the Philippines due to his nationality.

=== NCAA and PBL ===
In 1998, Alas barged into NCAA territory with Letran. He immediately captured that year's championship trophy by sweeping the San Sebastian Stags in a best-of-three series.

In 2003, his Letran Knights will face the Stags again in the finals and once again he prevailed thanks to the heroics of Boyet Bautista, Aaron Aban and Jonathan Pinera. Right after the title win, the Knights joined the Philippine Basketball League under the name of Toyota Otis-Letran. The Knights captured the third-place trophy in the league's Unity Cup after beating defending champions Hapee Toothpaste Sparklers. In the 2006 PBL Unity Cup, he led Toyota to its first finals appearance only to lose to the Harbour Centre Portmasters in the pivotal fifth game in their best-of-5 series.

In 2005, he gave Letran its 16th NCAA Championship by beating the PCU Dolphins 2–1 in their epic championship series despite being down 0–1. They also ended the eliminations with a 13–1 win–loss card which is their best record since 1950.

In 2007, he suffered his very first NCAA championship loss in the hands of the San Beda Red Lions who swept them in two games. during the championship series, basketball analysts were very aware of his coaching mystique that some believed he can pull off an upset against the mighty Red Lions.

In 2012, at his last year at Letran, he led the team with a finals appearance, but lost again to Red Lions, this time coached by Ronnie Magsanoc.

His stint with Letran has a total of three championships.

=== Philippine youth and senior national team ===
He made his coaching debut in the national team by assisting San Beda College High School coach Ato Badolato in the SEABA Jrs in 1996. The team was led by Ren-Ren Ritualo and Aries Dimaunahan. A year later, he was named coach of the youth team and formed a formidable lineup composed of future basketball stars like Kerby Raymundo, Enrico Villanueva, Cyrus Baguio, Yancy de Ocampo and others. The team won the SEABA Championship and placed third in the ABC Juniors Championship.

After his stint with the youth, he was tasked to coach the Philippines in the 1999 Southeast Asian Games in Brunei. Majority of his players were from his MBA team, the Manila Metrostars because prior to the competition, the Metrostars were the top-seeded team in that season. He led the Philippines to a gold medal by sweeping the whole tournament and beating Thailand in the Gold Medal Match.

In December 2007, he helped the Philippines win another gold medal in the 2007 Southeast Asian Games in Ratchaburi, Thailand. This time though, he was an assistant coach to Junel Baculi.

=== Return to Pros ===
==== Assistant for Alaska Aces ====
Alas became an assistant for Alaska Aces under Luigi Trillo. The team won the 2013 Commissioner's Cup title. After winning the title, he was rumored to coach Ginebra, the team they defeated to clinch the title. He stayed with the Aces until 2017.

==== Phoenix Fuel ====
He was hired as head coach of Phoenix Pulse Fuel Masters in 2017. He led the team into a semi-finals appearance. He was fired by the team in 2020.

==== Zamboanga Valientes ====
Alas was hired as head coach of Zamboanga Valientes in the MPBL.

=== Return to Collegiate ranks ===
==== La Salle shortlist ====
After Phoenix stint, Alas was rumored to be the head coach of De La Salle Green Archers in 2023. But did not come to fruition.

==== Assistant at Ateneo ====
In 2024, Alas was hired as a deputy coach (Associate HC) for the Ateneo Blue Eagles under Tab Baldwin.

== Personal life ==
Alas' son, Kevin, is also a basketball player.

== Coaching profile ==
He is known to nicknames such as "Coach A" or "The Ace Coach". So far, he has tallied a total of 220 wins and 120 losses with a .647 winning percentage. As a coach, he specializes on defense. He became the first non-Letran graduate coach in school history to give Letran at least 3 championships (1998, 2003, and 2005) and 10 Final Four appearances.

== Coaching record ==
=== Collegiate record ===
Season	Team	Elimination round					Playoffs				
Season	Team	G	W	L	PCT	Finish	PG	W	L	PCT	Results
1998	CSJL	14	12	2	.857	1st	3	3	0	1.000	Champions
2002	CSJL	14	7	7	.500	6th	—	—	—	—	Eliminated
2003	CSJL	14	9	5	.643	1st	4	3	1	.750	Champions
2004	CSJL	14	9	5	.643	3rd	2	1	1	.500	Semifinals
2005	CSJL	14	13	1	.929	1st	4	3	1	.750	Champions
2006	CSJL	14	10	4	.714	3rd	2	0	2	.000	Semifinals
2007	CSJL	12	9	3	.750	2nd	3	1	2	.333	Finals
2008	CSJL	14	9	5	.643	3rd	3	1	2	.333	Semifinals
2009	CSJL	18	12	6	.667	4th	1	0	1	.000	Semifinals
2010	CSJL	16	7	9	.438	5th	—	—	—	—	Eliminated
2011	CSJL	18	14	4	.778	3rd	2	1	1	.500	Semifinals
2012	CSJL	18	12	6	.667	3rd	5	3	2	.600	Lost in the finals
Totals		180	123	57	.683	Playoff Totals	29	16	13	.558	3 championships

=== ABL ===
Season	Team	GP	W	L	PCT	Finish	PG	W	L	P-PCT	Results
2009–10	Air Asia PHI	13	10	3	.733	1st	5	5	0	1.000	Champions
2010–11	Air Asia PHI	15	9	6	.600	2nd	4	2	2	.500	Finals
Totals		28	19	9	.679	Playoff totals	9	7	2	.778	1 championship

=== PBA ===
Season	Conference	Team	GP	W	L	PCT	Finish	PG	W	L	P-PCT	Results
2000	Commissioner's Cup	Mobiline	9	4	5	.444	6th	1	0	1	.000	Quarterfinals
2000	Governors' Cup	Mobiline	9	7	2	.778	1st	6	2	4	.333	Semifinals
2001	All-Filipino Cup	Talk 'N Text	14	6	8	.429	8th	2	1	1	.500	Quarterfinals
2001	Commissioner's Cup	Talk 'N Text	9	3	6	.333	8th	1	0	1	.000	Quarterfinals
2001	Governors' Cup	Talk 'N Text	13	7	6	.538	5th	1	0	1	.000	Quarterfinals
2017–18	Philippine Cup	Phoenix	11	5	6	.455	9th	—	—	—	—	Eliminated
2017–18	Commissioner's Cup	Phoenix	11	4	7	.364	10th	—	—	—	—	Eliminated
2017–18	Governors' Cup	Phoenix	11	8	3	.727	1st	0	0	2	.000	Quarterfinals
2019	Philippine Cup	Phoenix Pulse	11	9	2	.818	1st	6	2	4	.333	Semifinals
2019	Commissioner's Cup	Phoenix Pulse	11	4	7	.364	10th	—	—	—	—	Eliminated
2019	Governors' Cup	Phoenix Pulse	11	3	8	.273	11th	—	—	—	—	Eliminated
Career total			120	60	60	.500	Playoff total	17	5	14	.263	0 PBA championships

Preceded by Mollet Pineda	Letran Knights head coach 1998	Succeeded by Binky Favis
Preceded by Ricky Dandan	Manila Metrostars head coach 1999	Succeeded by Boysie Zamar
Preceded by Eric Altamirano	Mobiline Phone Pals head coach 2000–2001	Succeeded by Bill Bayno
Preceded by Binky Favis	Letran Knights head coach 2002–2012	Succeeded by Caloy Garcia
Preceded by Bogs Adornado (interim)	AirAsia Philippine Patriots head coach 2009–2011	Succeeded by Glenn Capacio
Preceded by Ariel Vanguardia	Phoenix Super LPG Fuel Masters head coach 2017–2019	Succeeded by Topex Robinson
Preceded by Tab Baldwin	Ateneo Blue Eagles head coach 2026–present	Succeeded by incumbent
