= 2007 Letran Knights basketball team =

2007 Letran Knights men's basketball

NCAA Season 83 runner-up

Record
- Elims rank: #2
- Final rank: #2
- 2007 record: 10–6 (9–3 elims)
- Head coach: Louie Alas (7th season)
- Assistant coaches: Justino Pinat; Carmelo Alas; Elmer Latonio
- Captain: Andro Quinday (5th season)

The 2007 Letran Knights men's basketball team represented Colegio de San Juan de Letran in the 83rd season of the National Collegiate Athletic Association in the Philippines. The men's basketball tournament for the school year 2007-08 began on June 23, 2007, and the host school for the season was Jose Rizal University.

The Knights finished the double round-robin eliminations at second place with 9 wins against 3 losses. After a 4–0 start, they were dealt with their first loss of the season against the hosts, JRU Heavy Bombers. Their win against San Beda in the first-round ensured a #1 finish for the Knights, but Mapúa denied them another 4–0 streak as MVP candidate Kelvin dela Peña lead the Cardinals with an almost triple-double performance. Letran faced San Beda again in the second-round, but the Red Lions avenged their first-round loss thanks to Borgie Hermida's late-game heroics. After the game, some coaching staffs and supporters from both teams engaged in a brawl.

Letran then eliminated JRU in the Final Four to face the defending champions San Beda Red Lions for the first time in the Finals after 57 years. The Knights, however, were swept by the Red Lions in two games. Bryan Faundo and Dino Daa were named members of the Mythical Five.

== Roster ==
Letran Knights roster
Players
Coaches

Pos.	No.	Nat.	Name	Height	Year	High School
F	4	(Philippines)	Reposar, Schubert Carlo	6'3" (1.91m)	2nd	–
C	5	(Philippines)	Faundo, Bryan	6'6" (1.98m)	4th	–
G	6	(Philippines)	Gutilban, Reymar	5'10" (1.78m)	2nd	Aquinas School
F	8	(United States)	Cabonce, Alvyn	6'4" (1.93m)	1st	Nile C. Kinnick High School
G	9	(Philippines)	Latonio, Anjoe Dace	–	1st	Colegio de San Juan de Letran
G	10	(Philippines)	Melegrito, John Carl	5'9" (1.75m)	3rd	Colegio de San Juan de Letran
G	11	(Philippines)	Del Rosario, Kirk	5'10" (1.78m)	2nd	Colegio de San Juan de Letran
G	12	(Philippines)	Dangcal, Reynaldo Jr.	5'9" (1.75m)	2nd	Colegio de San Juan de Letran
C	14	(Philippines)	Foronda, John Clarence	6'5" (1.96m)	1st	–
F	15	(Philippines)	Daa, Fiel Dino	6'2" (1.88m)	2nd	Marasbaras National HS
F	16	(Philippines)	Quinday, Andro Gil (C)	6'2" (1.88m)	5th	–
F	17	(Philippines)	Ranises, Regin	6'4" (1.93m)	2nd	Holy Child School of Davao
F	18	(Philippines)	Guevarra, Rey Francis	6'2" (1.88m)	2nd	Colegio de San Juan de Letran
C	19	(Philippines)	Foronda, John Julien	6'5" (1.96m)	2nd	Benedictine International School
G	20	(Philippines)	Jazul, Rafael Joey Jr.	5'11" (1.8m)	3rd	Colegio de San Juan de Letran

Head coach

- Francisco Luis Alas

Assistant coach(es)

- Carmelo Alas
- Elmer Latonio
- Justino Pinat

Team manager

- Ramon Oben

Legend

- (C) Team captain
- Injured

=== Depth chart ===
Pos.	Starting 5	Bench 1	Bench 2
C	arvin viñas	Reposar	Foronda, J
PF	Remo navarro	Cabonce	Foronda, C
SF	aljhon de leon	Quinday	Ranises
SG	sam condol	Gutilban	Dangcal
PG	Rickson Gabriel	Melegrito	Latonio

== NCAA Season 83 games results ==
Elimination games were played in a double round-robin format. All games were aired on Studio 23.

Date	Time	Opponent	Venue	Result	Record
First round of eliminations
Jun 23	4:00 p.m.	Mapúa Cardinals	Araneta Coliseum • Quezon City	W 84–80	1–0
Game Highs: Points: Jazul – 23; Rebounds: Daa – 7; Assists: Del Rosario – 5
Jun 29	4:00 p.m.	Benilde Blazers	The Arena • San Juan	W 92–81	2–0
Game Highs: Points: Faundo – 22; Rebounds: Faundo – 10; Assists: Jazul – 4
Jul 6	2:00 p.m.	San Sebastian Stags	The Arena • San Juan	W 71–61	3–0
Game Highs: Points: Jazul – 20; Rebounds: Daa – 8; Assists: Dangcal, Melegrito – 4
Jul 11	4:00 p.m.	Perpetual Altas	The Arena • San Juan	W 68–52	4–0
Game Highs: Points: Daa, Faundo – 15; Rebounds: Daa – 25; Assists: Jazul – 9
Jul 20	2:00 p.m.	JRU Heavy Bombers	The Arena • San Juan	L 75–79	4–1
Game Highs: Points: Jazul – 19; Rebounds: Del Rosario – 6; Assists: Faundo, Ranises – 3
Jul 25	4:00 p.m.	San Beda Red Lions	The Arena • San Juan	W 70–69	5–1
Game Highs: Points: Daa – 14; Rebounds: Quinday – 10; Assists: Jazul – 5
1st place after 1st round (5 wins–1 loss)
Second round of eliminations
Jul 27	2:00 p.m.	Benilde Blazers	The Arena • San Juan	W 51–49	6–1
Game Highs: Points: Guevarra – 14; Rebounds: Daa, Faundo – 12; Assists: Dangcal, Faundo – 3
Aug 1	4:00 p.m.	Perpetual Altas	The Arena • San Juan	W 63–56	7–1
Game Highs: Points: Reposar – 12; Rebounds: Daa – 9; Assists: Jazul – 5
Aug 8	2:00 p.m.	Mapúa Cardinals	The Arena • San Juan	L 82–89	7–2
Game Highs: Points: Daa – 19; Rebounds: Faundo – 11; Assists: Jazul – 5
Aug 24	4:00 p.m.	San Sebastian Stags	The Arena • San Juan	W 67–63	8–2
Game Highs: Points: Jazul – 23; Rebounds: Cabonce – 13; Assists: Jazul – 4
Aug 31	4:00 p.m.	San Beda Red Lions	Araneta Coliseum • Quezon City	L 84–87	8–3
Game Highs: Points: Jazul – 23; Rebounds: Daa – 10; Assists: Jazul – 8
Sep 3	4:00 p.m.	JRU Heavy Bombers	The Arena • San Juan	W 74–71	9–3
Game Highs: Points: Gutilban – 20; Rebounds: Faundo – 12; Assists: Jazul – 5
2nd place at 9 wins–3 losses (4 wins–2 losses in the 2nd round)
Final Four (Note: Letran held a twice-to-beat advantage over JRU)
Sep 12	2:00 p.m.	JRU Heavy Bombers	Araneta Coliseum • Quezon City	W 70–61	1–0 (10–4)
Game Highs: Points: Jazul – 17; Rebounds: Quinday – 9; Assists: Jazul – 3
Letran wins series in one game
Finals
Sep 19	4:00 p.m.	San Beda Red Lions	Araneta Coliseum • Quezon City	L 68–78	0–1 (10–5)
Game Highs: Points: Jazul – 17; Rebounds: Quinday – 8; Assists: Daa – 4
Sep 26	4:00 p.m.	San Beda Red Lions	Araneta Coliseum • Quezon City	L 64–76	0–2 (10–6)
Game Highs: Points: Faundo – 17; Rebounds: Faundo – 10; Assists: Jazul – 3
Lost series in two games

Times listed above are in UTC+08:00

Source: Ubelt.com

== Awards ==
Player	Award
Bryan Faundo	NCAA Mythical Five member
Dino Daa	NCAA Mythical Five member
