= 2012 Letran Knights basketball team =

2012 Letran Knights men's basketball

NCAA Season 88 runner-up

Record
- Elims rank: #3
- Final rank: #2
- 2012 record: 15–8 (12–6 elims)
- Head coach: Louie Alas (12th season)
- Assistant coaches: Justino Pinat; Kris Reyes; Ronjay Enrile; Eugene Tan; Monch Gavieres
- Captain: Kevin Alas (4th season)

The 2012 Letran Knights men's basketball team represented Colegio de San Juan de Letran in the 88th season of the National Collegiate Athletic Association in the Philippines. The men's basketball tournament for the school year 2012-13 began on June 23, 2012, and the host school for the season was also Letran.

The Knights finished the double round-robin eliminations at third place with 12 wins against 6 losses. In the opening night, Kevin Alas sets a career-high 31 points against the San Sebastian Stags. Alas broke his own record again in the Final Four, netting 43 points, against the Stags and forcing them in a do-or-die match. In the knockout game, the Knights dropped an upset axe against the second-seed Stags and finally barge into the Finals to set a best-of-three series against the defending champions San Beda Red Lions. However, the Knights lost to the Red Lions in three games. Kevin Alas was named member of the Mythical Five, while Raymond Almazan was awarded with the NCAA Defensive Player of the Year.

== Roster ==
Letran Knights roster
Players
Coaches

Pos.	No.	Nat.	Name	Height	Year	High School
C	5	(Philippines)	Cortes, Jamieson II	6'4" (1.93m)	5th	–
G	6	(Philippines)	Alas, Kevin Louie P. (C)	6'0" (1.83m)	4th	Colegio de San Juan de Letran
F	7	(Philippines)	Alas, Kristoffer Louie P.	6'3" (1.91m)	4th	Colegio de San Juan de Letran
F	8	(Philippines)	Almario, Alvin Japeth	–	1st	Far Eastern University - FERN College
F	12	(Philippines)	Belorio, Jonathan	6'3" (1.91m)	4th	Don Pablo Lorenzo Memorial High School
G	13	(Philippines)	Cruz, Mark L.	5'6" (1.68m)	2nd	Colegio de San Juan de Letran
G	14	(Philippines)	Lituania, Dan Carlo	5'10" (1.78m)	3rd	Jose Rizal University
F	16	(Philippines)	Racal, Kevin Kent	6'3" (1.91m)	2nd	Muntinlupa National HS
C	17	(Philippines)	Almazan, Raymond	6'8" (2.03m)	3rd	Orion National HS
F	18	(Philippines)	Cudal, Steven Zyron	6'3" (1.91m)	2nd	Colegio de San Juan de Letran
F	19	(Philippines)	Gabriel, Joel	6'3" (1.91m)	3rd	–
—	20	(Philippines)	Pantin, Ramon Andrei	6'0" (1.83m)	4th	St. Joseph School
F	21	(Philippines)	Gabawan, Jamil Joseph	6'3" (1.91m)	2nd	Balanga National HS
F	23	(Nigeria)	Olotu, Ayodele Edward B.	6'2" (1.88m)	1st	Lipa Grace Academy
G	29	(Philippines)	Luib, McJour	5'11" (1.8m)	1st	Colegio de San Juan de Letran

Head coach

- Francisco Luis Alas

Assistant coach(es)

- Justino Pinat
- Kris Reyes
- Ronjay Enrile
- Eugene Tan
- Monch Gavieres

Legend

- (C) Team captain
- Injured

=== Depth chart ===
Pos.	Starting 5	Bench 1	Bench 2
C	Almazan	Alas, J	Cudal
PF	Cortes	Gabawan	Gabriel
SF	Belorio	Racal	Almario
SG	Alas, K	Pantin	Olotu
PG	Lituania	Cruz	Luib

== Suspensions ==
- The NCAA Management Committee slapped Letran center Jam Cortes with a one-game suspension for a disqualifying foul he committed during the first-round encounter against the Arellano Chiefs. Meanwhile, Jonathan Belorio was given only a stern warning.
- Letran big man Kristoffer Alas was given a one-game suspension for a disqualifying foul he committed during the Final Four game against the San Sebastian Stags. He sat out in the winner-take-all match.
- Letran head coach Louie Alas avoided suspension by issuing an apology for his "throat-slitting" motion during Game 1 of the NCAA Finals.

== NCAA Season 88 games results ==
Elimination games were played in a double round-robin format. All games were aired on AKTV.

Date	Time	Opponent	Venue	Result	Record
First round of eliminations
Jun 23	5:00 p.m.	San Sebastian Stags	Smart Araneta Coliseum • Quezon City	W 80–74	1–0
Game Highs: Points: Ke. Alas – 31; Rebounds: Cortes – 17
Jun 30	6:00 p.m.	Perpetual Altas	Filoil Flying V Arena • San Juan	L 66–69	1–1
Jul 7	4:00 p.m.	Arellano Chiefs	Filoil Flying V Arena • San Juan	L 67–77	1–2
Jul 9	4:00 p.m.	Benilde Blazers	Filoil Flying V Arena • San Juan	L 60–77	1–3
Jul 16	6:00 p.m.	Mapúa Cardinals	Filoil Flying V Arena • San Juan	W 66–60	2–3
Jul 25	1:00 p.m.	EAC Generals	San Luis Sports Complex • Santa Cruz, Laguna	W 65–62	3–3
Aug 2	4:00 p.m.	Lyceum Pirates	Filoil Flying V Arena • San Juan	W 70–60	4–3
Aug 13	4:00 p.m.	JRU Heavy Bombers	Filoil Flying V Arena • San Juan	L 83–101	4–4
Aug 16	6:00 p.m.	San Beda Red Lions	Filoil Flying V Arena • San Juan	L 43–65	4–5
6th place after the 1st round (4 wins–5 losses)
Second round of eliminations
Aug 23	4:00 p.m.	Mapúa Cardinals	Filoil Flying V Arena • San Juan	W 72–60	5–5
Aug 27	6:00 p.m.	Perpetual Altas	Filoil Flying V Arena • San Juan	W 62–57	6–5
Sep 1	6:00 p.m.	San Beda Red Lions	Filoil Flying V Arena • San Juan	L 62–68	6–6
Sep 6	4:00 p.m.	Lyceum Pirates	Filoil Flying V Arena • San Juan	W 76–60	7–6
Sep 10	6:00 p.m.	Benilde Blazers	Filoil Flying V Arena • San Juan	W 97–83	8–6
Sep 15	6:00 p.m.	San Sebastian Stags	Filoil Flying V Arena • San Juan	W 82–67	9–6
Sep 22	6:00 p.m.	JRU Heavy Bombers	Filoil Flying V Arena • San Juan	W 70–59	10–6
Sep 29	4:00 p.m.	EAC Generals	Filoil Flying V Arena • San Juan	W 86–80	11–6
Oct 6	4:00 p.m.	Arellano Chiefs	Filoil Flying V Arena • San Juan	W 76–58	12–6
3rd place at 12 wins–6 losses (8 wins–1 loss in the 2nd round)
Final Four (Note: San Sebastian held a twice-to-beat advantage over Letran)
Oct 13	6:00 p.m.	San Sebastian Stags	Smart Araneta Coliseum • Quezon City	W 92–74	1–0 (13–6)
Game Highs: Points: Ke. Alas – 43; Rebounds: Racal – 14
Oct 15	5:00 p.m.	San Sebastian Stags	Filoil Flying V Arena • San Juan	W 73–70	2–0 (14–6)
Game Highs: Points: Cruz – 20
Letran wins series in two games
Finals
Oct 18	6:00 p.m.	San Beda Red Lions	Mall of Asia Arena • Pasay	L 60–62	0–1 (14–7)
Game Highs: Points: Ke. Alas – 18
Oct 20	6:00 p.m.	San Beda Red Lions	Smart Araneta Coliseum • Quezon City	W 64–55	1–1 (15–7)
Game Highs: Points: Belorio – 15; Rebounds: Cortes – 11
Oct 26	1:00 p.m.	San Beda Red Lions	Smart Araneta Coliseum • Quezon City	L 39–67	1–2 (15–8)
Game Highs: Points: Cruz – 12
Lost series in three games

Times listed above are in UTC+08:00

Source: PBA-Online

== Awards ==
Player	Award
Kevin Alas	NCAA Mythical Five member
Raymond Almazan	NCAA Defensive Player of the Year
