= 2010 Letran Knights basketball team =

2010 Letran Knights men's basketball

Record
- Elims rank: #5
- Final rank: #5
- 2010 record: 7–9
- Head coach: Louie Alas (10th season)
- Assistant coaches: Justino Pinat; Carmelo Alas; Kristoffer Reyes
- Captain: Jam Cortes (3rd season)

The 2010 Letran Knights men's basketball team represented Colegio de San Juan de Letran in the 86th season of the National Collegiate Athletic Association in the Philippines. The men's basketball tournament for the school year 2010-11 began on June 26, 2010, and the host school for the season was San Sebastian College–Recoletos.

The Knights finished the double round-robin eliminations at fifth place with 7 wins against 9 losses. This is the first time the Knights missed the Final Four playoffs since 2002.

== Roster ==
Letran Knights roster
Players
Coaches

Pos.	No.	Nat.	Name	Height	Year	High School
G	4	(Philippines)	Dysam, Franz Dionne	5'8" (1.73m)	3rd	University of Southern Philippines
C	5	(Philippines)	Cortes, Jamieson II (C)	6'4" (1.93m)	3rd	–
G	6	(Philippines)	Alas, Kevin Louie	6'0" (1.83m)	2nd	Colegio de San Juan de Letran
F	7	(Philippines)	Alas, Kristoffer Louie	6'3" (1.91m)	2nd	Colegio de San Juan de Letran
G	8	(Liberia)	Taplah, Aloysius Trueh	5'9" (1.75m)	2nd	Christian School International
G	9	(Philippines)	Pantin, Ramon Andrei	6'0" (1.83m)	2nd	St. Joseph School
F	10	(United States)	Espiritu, Victor Jay	6'3" (1.91m)	1st	Carson High School
F	11	(Philippines)	Roxas, Jeremy	6'3" (1.91m)	1st	Colegio de San Juan de Letran
F	12	(Philippines)	Belorio, Jonathan	6'3" (1.91m)	2nd	Don Pablo Lorenzo Memorial High School
G	14	(Philippines)	Ang, Patrick Nelzen	6'0" (1.83m)	2nd	–
F	15	(Philippines)	Publico, Reynaldo Jr.	6'2" (1.88m)	2nd	–
F	16	(Philippines)	Belencion, Jaypee	6'3" (1.91m)	3rd	Hua Siong College of Iloilo
C	17	(Philippines)	Almazan, Raymond	6'7" (2.01m)	1st	Orion National HS
G	18	(Philippines)	Alejandro, Lean	5'11" (1.8m)	1st	–
G	19	(United States)	Rodil, Alberto Rodolfo	6'0" (1.83m)	1st	Meade Senior HS

Head coach

- Francisco Luis Alas

Assistant coach(es)

- Carmelo Alas
- Kristoffer Reyes
- Justino Pinat

Team manager

- Ramon Oben

Legend

- (C) Team captain
- Injured

=== Depth chart ===
Pos.	Starting 5	Bench 1	Bench 2
C	Cortes	Alas, J	Almazan
PF	Belorio	Publico	Roxas
SF	Belencion	Espiritu	Rodil
SG	Alas, K	Pantin	Taplah
PG	Dysam	Ang	Alejandro

== NCAA Season 86 games results ==
Elimination games were played in a double round-robin format. All games were aired on Studio 23.

Date	Time	Opponent	Venue	Result	Record
First round of eliminations
Jun 26	2:00 p.m.	San Sebastian Stags	Araneta Coliseum • Quezon City	L 53–59	0–1
Game Highs: Points: Belencion, Taplah – 11; Rebounds: Cortes – 8; Assists: Taplah – 3
Jul 5	4:00 p.m.	JRU Heavy Bombers	Filoil Flying V Arena • San Juan	L 62–67^{OT}	0–2
Game Highs: Points: Ke. Alas – 18; Rebounds: Cortes – 10; Assists: Dysam – 4
Jul 9	2:00 p.m.	Perpetual Altas	Filoil Flying V Arena • San Juan	W 87–69	1–2
Game Highs: Points: Dysam – 21; Rebounds: Belorio – 11; Assists: Dysam, Ke. Alas – 3
Jul 21	4:00 p.m.	San Beda Red Lions	Filoil Flying V Arena • San Juan	L 60–77	1–3
Jul 30	2:00 p.m.	Mapúa Cardinals	Filoil Flying V Arena • San Juan	L 51–66	1–4
Aug 4	2:00 p.m.	Benilde Blazers	Filoil Flying V Arena • San Juan	W 51–66	2–4
Aug 13	2:00 p.m.	Arellano Chiefs	Filoil Flying V Arena • San Juan	L 76–78	2–5
Aug 16	2:00 p.m.	EAC Generals	Filoil Flying V Arena • San Juan	W 88–65	3–5
6th place after the 1st round (3 wins–5 losses)
Second round of eliminations
Aug 20	4:00 p.m.	JRU Heavy Bombers	Filoil Flying V Arena • San Juan	L 60–76	3–6
Game Highs: Points: Belencion – 14; Rebounds: Cortes – 9; Assists: Dysam – 3
Aug 25	4:00 p.m.	Mapúa Cardinals	Filoil Flying V Arena • San Juan	L 60–63	3–7
Aug 30	4:00 p.m.	Arellano Chiefs	Filoil Flying V Arena • San Juan	W 72–58	4–7
Game Highs: Points: Dysam – 17; Rebounds: Cortes – 21; Assists: Dysam – 4
Sep 8	2:00 p.m.	Perpetual Altas	Filoil Flying V Arena • San Juan	W 90–61	5–7
Game Highs: Points: Ke. Alas – 16; Rebounds: Cortes – 13; Assists: Taplah – 5
Sep 13	4:00 p.m.	San Sebastian Stags	Filoil Flying V Arena • San Juan	L 58–59	5–8
Game Highs: Points: Ke. Alas – 14; Rebounds: Cortes – 12; Assists: Belencion – 3
Sep 15	2:00 p.m.	Benilde Blazers	Filoil Flying V Arena • San Juan	W 72–69	6–8
Game Highs: Points: Ke. Alas – 19; Rebounds: Cortes – 15; Assists: Ke. Alas – 7
Sep 24	4:00 p.m.	San Beda Red Lions	Filoil Flying V Arena • San Juan	L 80–60	6–9
Game Highs: Points: Ke. Alas – 18; Rebounds: Cortes, Kr. Alas – 6; Assists: Ke. Alas – 7
Sep 27	2:00 p.m.	EAC Generals	Filoil Flying V Arena • San Juan	W 68–47	7–9
Game Highs: Points: Belencion, Cortes – 15; Rebounds: Cortes – 15; Assists: Belencion, Taplah – 4
5th place at 7 wins–9 losses (4 wins–4 losses in the 2nd round)

Times listed above are in UTC+08:00

Source: inboundPASS
