= 2011 Letran Knights basketball team =

2011 Letran Knights men's basketball

NCAA Season 87 semifinalist

Record
- Elims rank: #3
- Final rank: #3
- 2011 record: 15–5 (14–4 elims)
- Head coach: Louie Alas (11th season)
- Assistant coaches: Justino Pinat; Allen Ricardo; Kris Reyes
- Captain: Jam Cortes (4th season)

The 2011 Letran Knights men's basketball team represented Colegio de San Juan de Letran in the 87th season of the National Collegiate Athletic Association in the Philippines. The men's basketball tournament for the school year 2011-12 began on July 2, 2011, and the host school for the season was University of Perpetual Help System DALTA.

The Knights finished the double round-robin eliminations at third place with 14 wins against 4 losses, securing a Final Four spot again after a disappointing fifth-place finish last season. In the second-round of eliminations, the Knights pulled off an upset in overtime as they halted the San Sebastian Stags' 15-game winning run. In the Final Four, the Knights pulled off another upset again as they forced the Stags in a knockout match, but they faltered in the next game. Kevin Alas and Raymond Almazan were named members of the Mythical Five, and Almazan also bagged the NCAA Most Improved Player honors.

== Roster ==
Letran Knights roster
Players
Coaches

Pos.	No.	Nat.	Name	Height	Year	High School
G	4	(Philippines)	Dysam, Franz Dionne	5'9" (1.75m)	4th	University of Southern Philippines
C	5	(Philippines)	Cortes, Jamieson II (C)	6'4" (1.93m)	4th	–
G	6	(Philippines)	Alas, Kevin Louie P.	6'0" (1.83m)	3rd	Colegio de San Juan de Letran
F	7	(Philippines)	Alas, Kristoffer Louie P.	6'3" (1.91m)	3rd	Colegio de San Juan de Letran
F	10	(United States)	Espiritu, Victor Jay	6'3" (1.91m)	2nd	Carson High School
F	12	(Philippines)	Belorio, Jonathan	6'3" (1.91m)	3rd	Don Pablo Lorenzo Memorial High School
G	13	(Philippines)	Cruz, Mark L.	5'6" (1.68m)	1st	Colegio de San Juan de Letran
G	14	(Philippines)	Lituania, Dan Carlo	5'10" (1.78m)	2nd	Jose Rizal University
F	16	(Philippines)	Racal, Kevin Kent R.	6'3" (1.91m)	1st	Muntinlupa National HS
C	17	(Philippines)	Almazan, Raymond C.	6'7" (2.01m)	2nd	Orion National HS
F	18	(Philippines)	Cudal, Steven Zyron	6'3" (1.91m)	1st	Colegio de San Juan de Letran
F	19	(Philippines)	Gabriel, Joel	6'3" (1.91m)	2nd	–
G	20	(Philippines)	Pantin, Ramon Andrei	6'0" (1.83m)	3rd	St. Joseph School
F	21	(Philippines)	Gabawan, Jamil Joseph	6'3" (1.91m)	1st	Balanga National HS
F	19	(Philippines)	Mendoza, Andrei	6'4" (1.93m)	1st	–

Head coach

- Francisco Luis Alas

Assistant coach(es)

- Justino Pinat
- Allen Ricardo
- Kris Reyes

Legend

- (C) Team captain
- Injured

=== Depth chart ===
Pos.	Starting 5	Bench 1	Bench 2
C	Almazan	Alas, J	Mendoza
PF	Cortes	Espiritu	Cudal
SF	Belorio	Racal	Gabriel
SG	Alas, K	Pantin	Gabawan
PG	Dysam	Lituania	Cruz

== NCAA Season 87 games results ==
Elimination games were played in a double round-robin format. All games were aired on Studio 23.

Date	Time	Opponent	Venue	Result	Record
First round of eliminations
Jul 2	6:00 p.m.	Mapúa Cardinals	Smart Araneta Coliseum • Quezon City	W 76–65	1–0
Game Highs: Points: Ke. Alas – 22; Rebounds: Cortes – 11; Assists: Ke. Alas – 6
Jul 8	4:00 p.m.	Perpetual Altas	Filoil Flying V Arena • San Juan	W 74–43	2–0
Game Highs: Points: Espiritu – 18; Rebounds: Cortes – 10; Assists: Ke. Alas – 5
Jul 15	2:00 p.m.	Arellano Chiefs	Filoil Flying V Arena • San Juan	W 88–70	3–0
Game Highs: Points: Cortes – 16; Rebounds: Cortes, Ke. Alas – 9; Assists: Ke. Alas – 6
Jul 20	4:00 p.m.	San Sebastian Stags	Filoil Flying V Arena • San Juan	L 62–71	3–1
Game Highs: Points: Ke. Alas – 14; Rebounds: Cortes – 17; Assists: Ke. Alas – 4
Jul 27	2:00 p.m.	Benilde Blazers	Filoil Flying V Arena • San Juan	W 112–91	4–1
Game Highs: Points: Cortes, Ke. Alas – 19; Rebounds: Cortes – 12; Assists: Ke. Alas – 6
Aug 1	4:00 p.m.	San Beda Red Lions	Filoil Flying V Arena • San Juan	L 62–77	4–2
Game Highs: Points: Ke. Alas – 24; Rebounds: Cortes – 11; Assists: Dysam – 4
Aug 5	2:00 p.m.	Lyceum Pirates	Filoil Flying V Arena • San Juan	W 92–89^{OT}	5–2
Game Highs: Points: Ke. Alas – 24; Rebounds: Cortes – 11; Assists: Ke. Alas – 12
Aug 12	2:00 p.m.	EAC Generals	Filoil Flying V Arena • San Juan	W 76–67	6–2
Game Highs: Points: Cortes – 18; Rebounds: Cortes – 20; Assists: Ke. Alas – 5
Aug 19	2:00 p.m.	JRU Heavy Bombers	Filoil Flying V Arena • San Juan	W 70–59	7–2
Game Highs: Points: Ke. Alas – 18; Rebounds: Almazan – 17; Assists: Almazan – 3
3rd place after the 1st round (7 wins–2 losses)
Second round of eliminations
Aug 24	2:00 p.m.	Arellano Chiefs	Filoil Flying V Arena • San Juan	W 73–59	8–2
Game Highs: Points: Ke. Alas – 17; Rebounds: Cortes – 9; Assists: Cruz – 5
Aug 31	4:00 p.m.	JRU Heavy Bombers	Filoil Flying V Arena • San Juan	W 75–56	9–2
Game Highs: Points: Ke. Alas – 17; Rebounds: Cortes, Racal – 7; Assists: Ke. Alas – 5
Sep 7	2:00 p.m.	Mapúa Cardinals	Filoil Flying V Arena • San Juan	W 69–67^{OT}	10–2
Game Highs: Points: Ke. Alas – 20; Rebounds: Almazan, Espiritu – 8; Assists: Ke. Alas – 5
Sep 9	2:00 p.m.	Lyceum Pirates	Filoil Flying V Arena • San Juan	W 88–74	11–2
Game Highs: Points: Ke. Alas – 29; Rebounds: Almazan – 14; Assists: Ke. Alas – 11
Sep 21	4:00 p.m.	EAC Generals	Filoil Flying V Arena • San Juan	W 80–58	12–2
Game Highs: Points: Ke. Alas – 20; Rebounds: Almazan, Ke. Alas – 11; Assists: Ke. Alas – 6
Sep 26	11:45 a.m.	Perpetual Altas	Filoil Flying V Arena • San Juan	L 53–68	12–3
Game Highs: Points: Espiritu – 14; Rebounds: Almazan, Cortes – 11; Assists: Almazan – 3
Sep 30	4:00 p.m.	San Sebastian Stags	Filoil Flying V Arena • San Juan	W 82–81^{OT}	13–3
Game Highs: Points: Ke. Alas – 22; Rebounds: Cortes – 7; Assists: Ke. Alas – 9
Oct 3	11:45 a.m.	Benilde Blazers	Filoil Flying V Arena • San Juan	W 72–60	14–3
Game Highs: Points: Ke. Alas – 16; Rebounds: Ke. Alas, Cortes – 9; Assists: Ke. Alas – 6
Oct 7	4:00 p.m.	San Beda Red Lions	Filoil Flying V Arena • San Juan	L 68–84	14–4
Game Highs: Points: Ke. Alas – 14; Rebounds: Almazan – 9; Assists: Ke. Alas – 5
3rd place at 14 wins–4 losses (7 wins–2 losses in the 2nd round)
Final Four (Note: SSC held a twice-to-beat advantage over Letran)
Oct 17	2:00 p.m.	San Sebastian Stags	Filoil Flying V Arena • San Juan	W 70–62	1–0 (15–4)
Game Highs: Points: Cortes – 16
Oct 19	4:00 p.m.	San Sebastian Stags	Filoil Flying V Arena • San Juan	L 56–63	1–1 (15–5)
Game Highs: Points: Ke. Alas – 26
Lost series in two games

Times listed above are in UTC+08:00

Source: PBA-Online

== Awards ==
Player	Award
Kevin Alas	NCAA Mythical Five member
Raymond Almazan	NCAA Mythical Five member
Raymond Almazan	NCAA Most Improved Player
