= NCAA Season 79 basketball tournaments =

NCAA Season 79
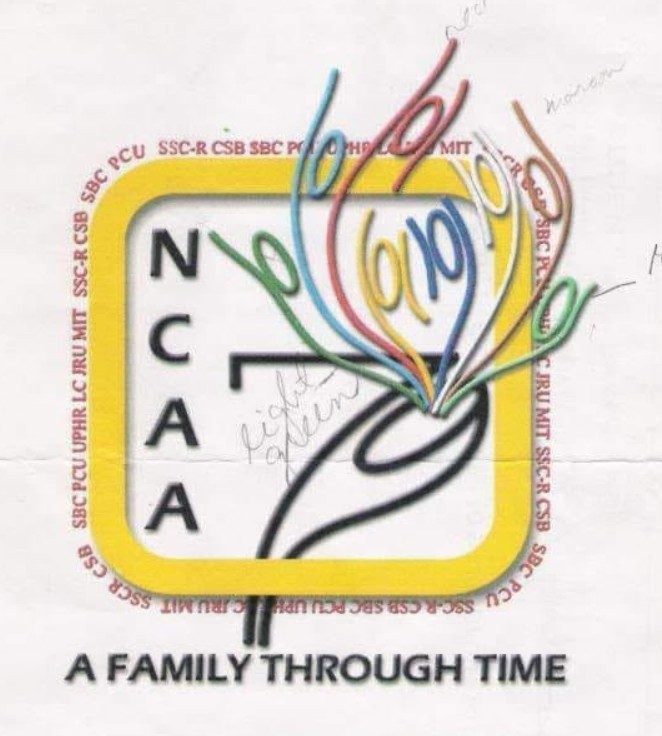
- Host school: San Sebastian College – Recoletos
Men's Finals	G1	G2	G3	Wins
Letran Knights	89	77	64	2
San Sebastian Stags	73	85	59	1
- Duration: September 17–24, 2003
- Arena(s): Rizal Memorial Coliseum; Cuneta Astrodome
- Finals MVP: Ronjay Enrile
- Winning coach: Louie Alas (2nd title)
- Semifinalists: JRU Heavy Bombers; Mapúa Cardinals
- TV network(s): ABS-CBN Sports; Studio 23
Juniors' Finals	G1	Wins
San Beda Red Cubs	74	1+1
Mapúa Red Robins	70	0
- Duration: September 20, 2003
- Arena(s): Rizal Memorial Coliseum
- Finals MVP: Rogemar Menor
- Winning coach: Ato Badolato (14th title)
- Semifinalists: Letran Squires; La Salle Green Hills Greenies
- TV network(s): ABS-CBN Sports; Studio 23

The basketball tournaments of NCAA Season 79 are the Philippines' National Collegiate Athletic Association tournaments for basketball in its 2003–2004 season. San Sebastian College – Recoletos hosted the season, starting with an opening ceremony held at the Araneta Coliseum on June 28, 2003, followed by four games. Former Philippine Basketball Association chairman, Shell executive, and San Sebastian alumnus Rey Gamboa graced as the guest of honor. Basketball Association of the Philippines secretary-general Graham Lim served as the season's commissioner. The theme of the season is "NCAA at 79: A Family Through Time." Games then are subsequently held at Rizal Memorial Coliseum and covered by ABS-CBN Sports via Studio 23.

== Men's tournament ==
=== Teams ===
Team	College	Coach
Letran Knights	Colegio de San Juan de Letran (CSJL)	(Philippines) Louie Alas
Benilde Blazers	De La Salle–College of Saint Benilde (CSB)	(Philippines) Dong Vergeire
JRU Heavy Bombers	José Rizal University (JRU)	(Philippines) Boy de Vera
Mapúa Cardinals	Mapúa Institute of Technology (MIT)	(Philippines) Horacio Lim
PCU Dolphins	Philippine Christian University (PCU)	(Philippines) Jimmy Mariano
San Beda Red Lions	San Beda College (SBC)	(Philippines) Jonathan Reyes
San Sebastian Stags	San Sebastian College – Recoletos (SSC-R)	(Philippines) Turo Valenzona
Perpetual Altas	University of Perpetual Help Rizal (UPHR)	(Philippines) Bai Cristobal

=== Elimination round ===
==== Team standing ====
Pos	Team	W	L	PCT	GB	Qualification
1	Letran Knights	9	5	.643 (Note: Head-to-head record: Letran 1–1 San Sebastian (Letran +7))	—	Twice-to-beat in the semifinals
2	San Sebastian Stags (H)	9	5	.643	—	Twice-to-beat in the semifinals
3	JRU Heavy Bombers	8	6	.571	1	Twice-to-win in the semifinals
4	Mapúa Cardinals	7	7	.500	2	Twice-to-win in the semifinals
5	San Beda Red Lions	6	8	.429 (Note: Head-to-head records: San Beda 2–2 (+11), Benilde 2–2 (+2), Perpetual 2–2 (−13))	3	
6	Benilde Blazers	6	8	.429	3	
7	Perpetual Altas	6	8	.429	3	
8	PCU Dolphins	5	9	.357	4	

Source: The Manila Times
Rules for classification: 1) winning percentage; 2) if tied for #2 and #4, one-game playoff; 3) head-to-head record; 4) head-to-head point differential; 5) overall point differential
(H) Hosts

==== Match-up results ====
	Round 1							Round 2						
Team ╲ Game	1	2	3	4	5	6	7	8	9	10	11	12	13	14
Letran	Mapua school colors	San Beda school colors	CSB school colors	SSC-R school colors	JRU school colors	UPHD school colors	PCU school colors	UPHD school colors	Mapua school colors	San Beda school colors	CSB school colors	PCU school colors	SSC-R school colors	JRU school colors
Benilde	UPHD school colors	PCU school colors	Letran school colors	JRU school colors	San Beda school colors	Mapua school colors	SSC-R school colors	JRU school colors	PCU school colors	UPHD school colors	SSC-R school colors	Letran school colors	Mapua school colors	San Beda school colors
JRU	SSC-R school colors	Mapua school colors	San Beda school colors	CSB school colors	Letran school colors	PCU school colors	UPHD school colors	CSB school colors	UPHD school colors	PCU school colors	Mapua school colors	SSC-R school colors	San Beda school colors	Letran school colors
Mapúa	Letran school colors	JRU school colors	UPHD school colors	PCU school colors	SSC-R school colors	CSB school colors	San Beda school colors	SSC-R school colors	Letran school colors	JRU school colors	UPHD school colors	San Beda school colors	CSB school colors	PCU school colors
PCU	San Beda school colors	CSB school colors	SSC-R school colors	Mapua school colors	UPHD school colors	JRU school colors	Letran school colors	San Beda school colors	CSB school colors	JRU school colors	SSC-R school colors	Letran school colors	UPHD school colors	Mapua school colors
San Beda	PCU school colors	Letran school colors	JRU school colors	UPHD school colors	CSB school colors	SSC-R school colors	Mapua school colors	PCU school colors	SSC-R school colors	Letran school colors	UPHD school colors	Mapua school colors	JRU school colors	CSB school colors
San Sebastian	JRU school colors	UPHD school colors	PCU school colors	Letran school colors	Mapua school colors	San Beda school colors	CSB school colors	Mapua school colors	San Beda school colors	CSB school colors	PCU school colors	JRU school colors	Letran school colors	UPHD school colors
Perpetual	CSB school colors	SSC-R school colors	Mapua school colors	San Beda school colors	PCU school colors	Letran school colors	JRU school colors	Letran school colors	JRU school colors	CSB school colors	San Beda school colors	Mapua school colors	PCU school colors	SSC-R school colors

Source: NCAA Philippines
= Win; = OT win; = Loss; = OT loss

==== Scores ====
Results on top and to the right of the dashes are for first-round games; those to the bottom and to the left of it are second-round games.

Teams	CSJL	CSB	JRU	MIT	PCU	SBC	SSC-R	UPHR
Letran Knights	—	77–75	67–78	58–66	84–72	69–63	73–64	68–66
Benilde Blazers	90–72	—	76–68	63–83	68–69	81–91	73–84	69–76
JRU Heavy Bombers	78–80	69–90	—	91–77	63–69	104–75	77–81	78–73
Mapúa Cardinals	77–67	72–78	77–82	—	61–50	82–85	61–63	61–59*
PCU Dolphins	90–94*	62–80	79–88	74–65	—	68–75	72–75	79–58
San Beda Red Lions	65–76	69–79	82–87	63–64	94–79	—	80–69	92–76
San Sebastian Stags	63–61	73–70	83–76	75–68	82–75	83–75	—	65–72
Perpetual Altas	56–60	60–69	78–70	67–52	61–62	68–63	76–66	—

Source: The Manila Times
Legend: Blue = left column team win; Red = top row team win.
Matches with lighter background shading were decided after overtime.

=== Bracket ===
Semifinals (Top 2 twice-to-beat)
1	Letran	72
4	Mapúa	66
2	San Sebastian	81
3	JRU	73

Finals (Best-of-three playoff)
1	Letran	89	77	64
2	San Sebastian	73	85	59

=== Semifinals ===
Letran and San Sebastian have the twice-to-beat advantage. They only have to win once, while their opponents, twice, to progress.

==== (1) Letran vs. (4) Mapua ====
Studio 23

September 10
2:00 p.m.

Letran Knights	72–66	Mapúa Cardinals
Scoring by half: 35-40
Letran wins series in one game

Rizal Memorial Coliseum, Manila

Trailing by five points at the half, the Knights took a 7-0 run led by Ronjay Enrile at the start of third quarter. Boyet Bautista then drew a series of fouls and made four straight points from the charity stripe to give the Knights their biggest lead, 56-50. The Cardinals, thanks to Christian Guevarra's three-point play, tried to tie the game at 60-all with four minutes remaining in the game. But the Knights turn to Jonathan Aldave, who scored 10 of his 13 points in the final canto, sealing the win.

==== (2) San Sebastian vs. (3) JRU ====
Studio 23

September 10
4:00 p.m.

San Sebastian Stags	81–73	JRU Heavy Bombers
San Sebastian wins series in one game

Rizal Memorial Coliseum, Manila

The Stags used an explosive run in the third quarter to put the Heavy Bombers for good. San Sebastian's Redentor Vicente led the Stags with 19 points, including eight straight in a 10-0 run in the third quarter and gave San Sebastian its biggest lead, 62-53.

=== Finals ===
This is the continuation of the San Sebastian–Letran rivalry. The last time they met in the Finals was in 1998, where Letran swept San Sebastian, 2-0, en route to the championship. The two-time defending champions Stags are in their fourth-consecutive Finals appearance since 2000. The Stags are mentored by Arturo Valenzona, who authored the Stags' first four of the five straight championships in 1993 to 1997 and added two more from 2001 to 2002. The Knights, on the other hand, won its last championship in 1999 under Binky Favis, are again led by Louie Alas, who gave Letran its 13th title in 1998.

Studio 23

September 17
4:00 p.m.

Letran Knights	89–73	San Sebastian Stags
Scoring by quarter: 21-21, 30-9, 20-24, 18-19
Pts: Ronjay Enrile 24		Pts: Baluyot, Najorda 14 each
Letran leads series, 1–0

Rizal Memorial Coliseum, Manila

Studio 23

September 19
4:00 p.m.

Letran Knights	77–85	San Sebastian Stags
Scoring by quarter: 13-21, 25-17, 23-21, 16-26
Pts: Ronjay Enrile 22		Pts: Leomar Najorda 20
Series tied, 1–1

Rizal Memorial Coliseum, Manila

Studio 23

September 24
3:00 p.m.

Letran Knights	64–59	San Sebastian Stags
Scoring by quarter: 21-22, 23-18, 12 -10, 8-9
Pts: Bautista, Enrile 19 each		Pts: Nicole Uy 18
Letran wins series, 2–1

Cuneta Astrodome, Pasay

- Finals Most Valuable Player: Ronjay Enrile (Letran Knights)

Letran came out in the first game with a barrage from the start of Game 1, even posting a 22-point outing in the third quarter, 59-37. Ronjay Enrile finished with 21 points, helping Letran to lead the series 1-0.

Tied at 71-all in the last three minutes of Game 2, the Stags gunned the Knights down with a 11-2 decisive run, thanks to Christian Baluyot's bail out three-pointer. Redentor Vicente and season MVP Leo Najorda put up the finishing touches to gave San Sebastian the win and extended the series.

Letran led San Sebastian by 11 points, 38-27, before halftime of Game 3, thanks to Aaron Aban's scoring during a 17-3 run. After Boyet Bautista tied the game, 58-all, in the last two minutes of the game, Jonathan Pinera and Aaron Aban made back-to-back clutch hits, as the Stags bungled all their chances to even the game and gave the Knights its 14th championship. Ronjay Enrile scored 19 points and was named Finals MVP.

=== Awards ===
NCAA Season 79 men's basketball champions
Letran Knights
15th title

- Most Valuable Player: Leomar Najorda (San Sebastian Stags)
- Rookie of the Year: Ronnie Bughao (San Beda Red Lions)
- Mythical Five:
  - Leomar Najorda (San Sebastian Stags)
  - Ronjay Enrile (Letran Knights)
  - Arjun Cordero (San Beda Red Lions)
  - Mcdonald Santos (JRU Heavy Bombers)
  - Alejandro Magpayo (Benilde Blazers)
- Most Improved Player: Jerome Paterno (San Beda Red Lions)
- Coach of the Year: Louie Alas (Letran Knights)

== Juniors' tournament ==
=== Elimination round ===
==== Team standing ====
Pos	Team	W	L	PCT	GB	Qualification
1	San Beda Red Cubs	14	0	1.000	—	Twice-to-beat in the Finals (Note: As San Beda won all of their elimination round games, the stepladder format will be used instead of the regular Final Four format.)
2	Letran Squires	11	3	.786	3	Proceed to stepladder round 2
3	Mapúa Red Robins	9	5	.643	5	Proceed to stepladder round 1
4	La Salle Green Hills Greenies	8	6	.571 (Note: Head-to-head record: LSGH 1-1 San Sebastian; LSGH +4)	6	Proceed to stepladder round 1
5	San Sebastian Staglets (H)	8	6	.571	6	
6	PCU Baby Dolphins	4	10	.286	10	
7	JRU Light Bombers	1	13	.071	13	
8	Perpetual Altalettes	1	13	.071	13	

Source: The Manila Times
Rules for classification: 1) winning percentage; 2) head-to-head record; 3) head-to-head point differential; 4) overall point differential
(H) Hosts

=== Bracket ===
Stepladder round 1 (Single-elimination)
3	Mapúa	82
4	LSGH	77

Stepladder round 2 (Single-elimination)
2	Letran	60
3	Mapúa	76

Finals (No. 1 twice-to-beat)
1	San Beda	74
3	Mapúa	70

=== Stepladder semifinals ===
All games were single-elimination.

==== (3) Mapúa vs. (4) LSGH ====
September 10
11:30 a.m.

Mapúa Red Robins	82–77	La Salle Green Hills Greenies

Rizal Memorial Coliseum, Manila

==== (2) Letran vs. (3) Mapúa ====
September 17
11:30 a.m.

Letran Squires	60–76	Mapúa Red Robins

Rizal Memorial Coliseum, Manila

=== Finals ===
Since San Beda swept the elimination round, they have a twice-to-beat advantage over Mapúa. This is a de facto best of three series with San Beda automatically leading 1-0. Therefore, San Beda has to win once, while Mapúa needed twice, to win the championship.

Studio 23

September 19
2:00pm

San Beda Red Cubs	74–70	Mapúa Red Robins
Scoring by quarter: 11-17, 24-12, 21-21, 18-20
Pts: Rogemar Menor 23		Pts: Michael Galinato 18
San Beda wins series in one game

Rizal Memorial Coliseum, Manila

- Finals Most Valuable Player: Rogemar Menor (San Beda Red Cubs)

Red Cubs team captain Ogie Menor, who finished with a double-double, went scoreless in the final period. But teammate James Martinez erupted for a 3-of-5 treys in the fourth quarter, and hit a 14-footer to break a 70-all deadlock with 12 seconds left in the game. Jay-R Taganas got fouled by Juan Tabaquero, then nailed two charities to seal the championship.

=== Awards ===
NCAA Season 79 juniors' basketball champions
San Beda Red Cubs
14th title, second consecutive title

- Most Valuable Player: Jay-R Taganas (San Beda Red Cubs)
- Rookie of the Year: Jay-R Taganas (San Beda Red Cubs)
- Mythical Five:
  - Jay-R Taganas (San Beda Red Cubs)
  - Rogemar Menor (San Beda Red Cubs)
  - Diogenes Villame (La Salle Green Hills Greenies)
  - Marlon Bituin (Letran Squires)
  - Jeff Morial (Letran Squires)
- Most Improved Player: Rogemar Menor (San Beda Red Cubs)
- Coach of the Year: Ato Badolato (San Beda Red Cubs)

== Broadcast notes ==
=== NCAA Final Four ===
September 10, 2003

Game	Play-by-play	Analyst	Courtside reporters	Team
Game 1	Anthony Suntay	Butch Maniego	JP Soriano (Letran) and Niña Sison (Mapúa)	Letran vs. Mapúa
Game 1	Bill Velasco	Allan Gregorio	Cesca Litton (SSC-R) and Peaches Aberin (JRU)	SSC-R vs. JRU

=== NCAA Finals ===
Game	Play-by-play	Analyst	Courtside reporters
Game 1	Anthony Suntay	Allan Gregorio	JP Soriano (Letran) and Cesca Litton (SSC-R)
Game 2	Bill Velasco	Butch Maniego	JP Soriano (Letran) and Cesca Litton (SSC-R)
Game 3	Bill Velasco	Butch Maniego	JP Soriano (Letran) and Cesca Litton (SSC-R)

== See also ==
- UAAP Season 66 men's basketball tournament

Preceded by Season 78 (2002)	NCAA basketball seasons Season 79 (2003)	Succeeded by Season 80 (2004)
