= Aquinas School =

Roman Catholic school in Metro Manila, Philippines

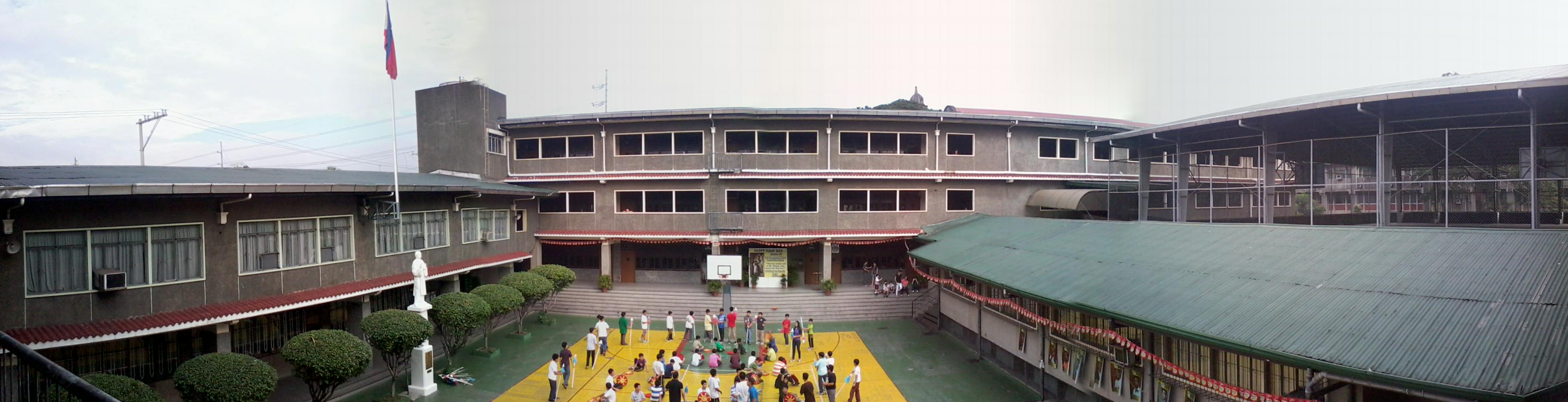

Location
- San Juan, Metro Manila, Philippines
- Coordinates: 14°35′52″N 121°1′50″E

Information
- Type: Private, Catholic, All-boys basic education institution
- Motto: A man of truth, justice, joy and compassion
- Religious affiliation: Roman Catholic (Dominican)
- Established: 1965; 61 years ago
- Principal: Sr. Rosalinda F. Calong, O.P.
- Campus: 183 F. Blumentritt Street, San Juan, Philippines (main campus)
- Color: Yellow - white - black
- Mascot: Ox
- Hymn: Aquinas Hymn
- Website: www.aquinas.edu.ph

Aquinas School is a private Catholic all-boys basic education institution run by the Dominican Province of our Lady of the Rosary Order of Preachers in San Juan, Metro Manila, Philippines. It was founded in 1965 and named after Thomas Aquinas, the patron saint of all Catholic schools and universities.

== Notable alumni ==
Rudy Fernandez	1969	Actor
Ariel "Aga" Muhlach	1985	Actor
Keempee de Leon	----	Actor / Comedian
