= Ronjay Enrile =

Filipino basketball player

Cebu Greats
- Title: Assistant coach
- League: MPBL

Personal information
- Born: August 20, 1982 (age 44) Quezon City, Philippines
- Listed height: 5 ft 11 in (1.80 m)
- Listed weight: 168 lb (76 kg)

Career information
- High school: Letran (Manila)
- College: Letran
- PBA draft: 2006: 2nd round, 17th overall pick
- Drafted by: Coca-Cola Tigers
- Playing career: 2006–2011, 2018–2019
- Position: Point guard
- Coaching career: 2012–present

Career history

Playing
- 2006–2011: Coca-Cola Tigers / Powerade Tigers
- 2018–2019: Pasig Pirates

Coaching
- 2012–2015: Letran (assistant)
- 2019: Pasig Pirates
- 2019–2021: Valenzuela Classic / SPV TOP Marketplace / Val City Carga Backload Solution / MJAS Zenith
- 2024: Zamboanga Master Sardines (assistant)
- 2025–present: Cebu Classic / Greats (assistant)

Ronjay Reyes Enrile (born August 20, 1982) is a Filipino former professional basketball player and coach who currently serves as an assistant coach for the Cebu Greats of the Maharlika Pilipinas Basketball League (MPBL). Enrile has played professionally in the Philippine Basketball Association (PBA) and the MPBL.

== PBA career statistics ==
Legend
GP	Games played	MPG	Minutes per game
FG%	Field-goal percentage	3P%	3-point field-goal percentage	FT%	Free-throw percentage
RPG	Rebounds per game	APG	Assists per game	SPG	Steals per game
BPG	Blocks per game	PPG	Points per game	**Bold**	Career high

=== Season-by-season averages ===
Year	Team	GP	MPG	FG%	3P%	FT%	RPG	APG	SPG	BPG	PPG
2006–07	Coca-Cola	5	10.2	.312	**.333**	.571	.8	**1.2**	.2	.0	3.0
2007–08	Coca-Cola	**24**	**14.5**	**.372**	.255	.636	**1.0**	1.1	**.3**	.0	**4.6**
2008–09	Coca-Cola	9	9.1	.300	.250	—	.9	1.1	.0	.0	2.3
2009–10	Coca-Cola	3	4.3	.250	.000	**.750**	.7	.0	**.3**	.0	1.7
2010–11	Powerade	8	7.9	.312	**.333**	.000	**1.0**	.4	**.3**	.0	1.4
Career		49	11.4	.346	.254	.600	.9	.9	.2	.0	3.3

Preceded by Arjun Cordero	NCAA Juniors' Basketball Most Valuable Player; 2000	Succeeded by Jay-R Reyes
Preceded by Leo Najorda	NCAA Seniors' Basketball Finals Most Valuable Player; 2003	Succeeded by Robert Sanz
