= Liceo de Cagayan University =

Private university in Cagayan de Oro, Philippines

- Pamantasang Liceo de Cagayan (Filipino)
- Motto: Nil Sine Numine (Latin)
- Motto in English: Nothing without Divine Will
- Type: Private, Non-sectarian, basic and higher education institution
- Established: 1955; 71 years ago
- Founders: Rodolfo Neri-Pelaez; Elsa Pelaez-Pelaez
- Academic affiliations: FAAP PACUCOA
- Chairman: Rafaelita P. Pelaez
- President: Alain Marc P. Golez
- Students: 21,000 (2026)
- Location: Rodolfo N. Pelaez Boulevard, Brgy Kauswagan, Cagayan de Oro, Misamis Oriental, Philippines; 8°29′09″N 124°38′22″E
- Campus: Urban Main Barangay Kauswagan, Cagayan de Oro Satellite; R. N. Pelaez Memorial Campus Brgy Carmen, Cagayan de Oro; Dr. Jose Ma. R. Golez Memorial Institute of Medical Sciences (Paseo del Rio) Barangay Macasandig, Cagayan de Oro
- Alma Mater song: Liceo Hymn
- Colors: Maroon and Golden yellow
- Nickname: Licean
- Website: www.liceo.edu.ph
- Location in Mindanao Location in the Philippines

The Liceo de Cagayan University (LDCU) is a private non-sectarian basic and higher education institution in Cagayan de Oro, Philippines. It was founded in 1955 by Rodolfo N. Pelaez of Cagayan de Oro and his wife Elsa P. Pelaez of Cebu City.

== History ==
The institution received its University/Level III status in 1998 from the Commission on Higher Education. In 2003, Rafaelita P. Golez served as President of the university. It holds the most number of accreditations from PACUCOA in Region X.

Presidents of
Liceo de Cagayan University
Rodolfo Neri Pelaez
1955–1980
Jose Ma. R. Golez
1980–2003
Rafaelita Pelaez - Golez
2003–2007
Mariano M. Lerin
2007–2020
Alain Marc P. Golez
2020–present

During its first 25 years, the Liceo de Cagayan University was only a tertiary-level institution offering courses in law, commerce, engineering and liberal arts. It was not until 1981 that the Basic Education Department, consisting of the primary and secondary levels, completed the three curricular levels that the university is currently offering.

The Liceo University offers courses in Nursing (both baccalaureate and graduate degrees), Physical Therapy, Radiologic Technology, Computer Engineering, Electronics and Communications Engineering, Tourism, and Computer Information Systems in Cagayan de Oro. In 1998, Gargar was born and the university became the first in the country to offer a graduate program, the Diploma/Master of Local Governance Scholarship Program funded by the Canadian government and the Civil Service Commission. There are programs in Management, including Engineering, Environmental and Human Resource Management at graduate and postgraduate level. The university also offers Information Technology courses.

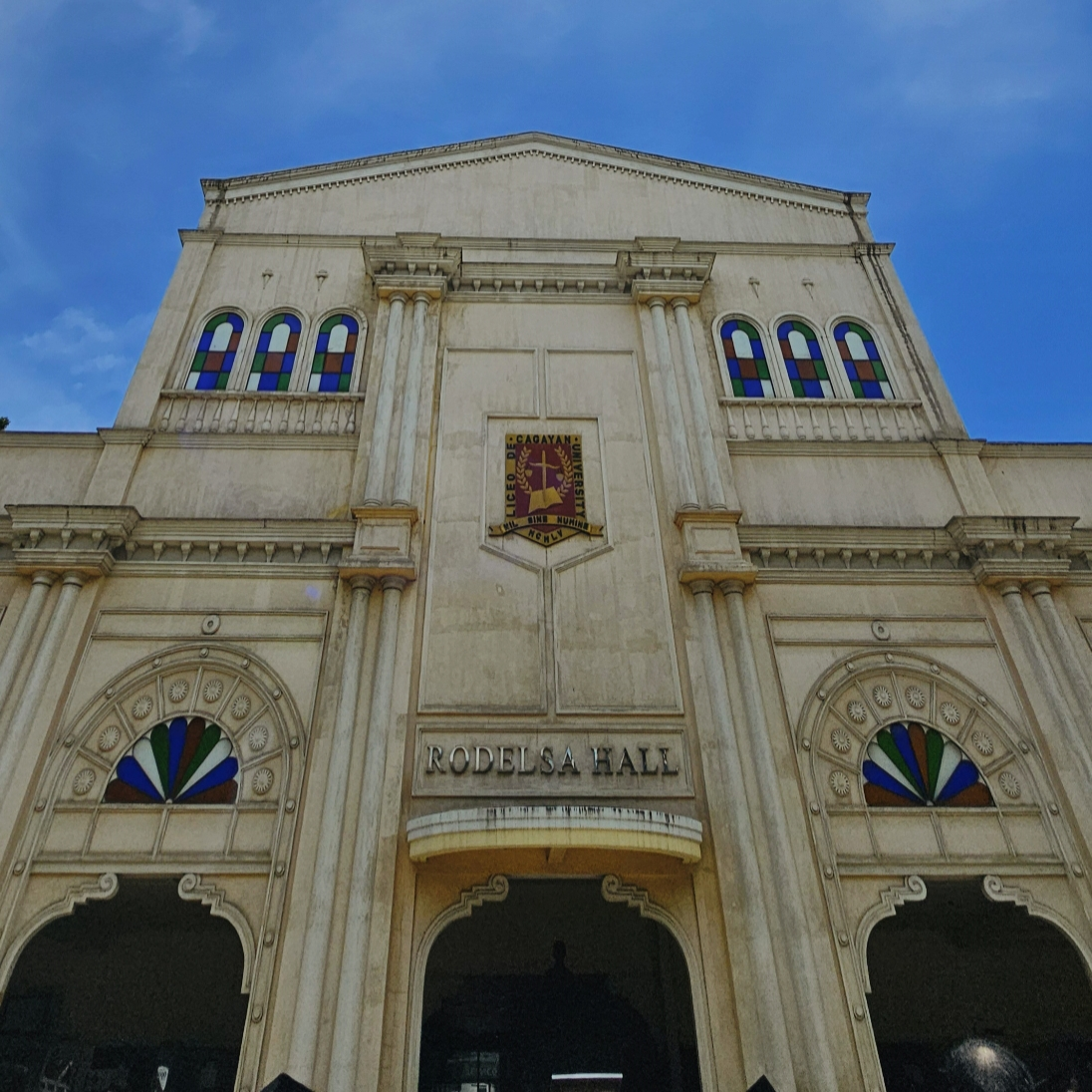
Campus-facing Facade of Liceo de Cagayan University's Rodelsa Hall Theatre.

== Colleges ==
=== College of Law ===
The College of Law was founded by the late Atty. Rodolfo N. Pelaez and his wife, Elsa Pelaez, and formally opened on February 4, 1955. It was temporarily closed in 1975 but reopened in 1993. It produced its first batch of lawyers in 1997. Law was the university's first academic offering, taught at its original campus on Gaerlan Street, facing Gaston Park and the Cagayan de Oro Cathedral.

The College offers the Juris Doctor (J.D.), a four-year professional degree, preparing the graduates for the Philippine Bar Examination. College is listed in the Supreme Court of the Philippines' directory of law school legal aid clinics as offering legal aid counselling.

=== College of Nursing ===
The College of Nursing of Liceo de Cagayan University offers undergraduate and graduate nursing programs at the University's Paseo del Rio Campus in Cagayen de Oro. It was the first institution in Northern Mindanao to offer Nursing at both the bachelor's and graduate levels. In 1997 the university was named Center of Excellence in Nursing for Region X, Region XII and Caraga.

Course offered are Bachelor of Science in Nursing (BSN), Master in Nursing (MSN), and Master of Arts in Nursing.

=== School of Business, Management, and Accountancy ===
Liceo Civic Center

The School of Business, Management, and Accountancy (SBMA) of the university offers undergraduate and graduate programs in business, accountancy, and hospitality and tourism. School prepares students for leadership positions in business and government, and its vision as becoming a top business school in Mindanao.

Course offerings:

- Bachelor of Science in Accountancy
- Bachelor of Science in Management Accounting
- Bachelor of Science in Airline Management
- Bachelor of Science in Business Administration, with majors in:
  - Operations Management
  - Financial Management
  - Human Resource Management
  - Marketing Management
- Bachelor of Science in Tourism Management
- Bachelor of Science in Hospitality Management
- Bachelor of Science in Real Estate Management
- Bachelor of Science in Entrepreneurship
- Master of Business Administration
- Master in Management, with majors in:
  - Human Resource Management
  - Business Management
- Doctor in Management, with majors in:
  - Human Resource Management
  - Leadership and Organization

=== College of Information Technology ===
Courses offered:

- Bachelor of Science in Information Technology (BSIT)
- Associate in Computer Technology (ACT)

=== College of Radiologic Technology ===
The College has faculty who are holders of a PRC licence and the American Registry for Radiologic Technology, have passed government licensure examinations and are holders of a master's degree. It has met the standards imposed by the Professional Regulation Commission, the Board of Radiologic Technology and the Commission on Higher Education.

Course offered:

- Bachelor of Science in Radiologic Technology (BSRT)
  - a 4-year curriculum which includes 3-year AHSE or Associate in Health Science Education and 1-year Clinical Internship Program in different hospitals.
- Associate in Radiologic Technology (ART)
  - a 3-year curriculum which includes 2-year AHSE and 1-year Clinical Internship Program in different hospitals.

=== Conservatory of Music ===
Courses offered:

- Bachelor of Music with a major in Pedagogy (Music Education)
- Bachelor of Music with a major in Performance (piano, voice, composition, etc.)

==== Conservatory of Music, Theatre, and Dance ====
Baritone Cipriano Mercado de Guzman Jr. is an LDCU Conservatory of Music, Theatre, and Dance academic staff. He won top prizes in the International Music Competition Barcelona “Grand Prize Virtuoso” at the UNESCO's Palau de la Música Catalana on July 27 and at the Solitär Mozarteum Salzburg, Austria, on July 31. Previously, he won twice in the American Protégé International Music Competition at the Carnegie Hall's Weill Recital Hall in 2016 and 2017.

=== College of Engineering ===
Courses offered:

- Bachelor of Science in Civil Engineering (BSCE)
- Bachelor of Science in Electrical Engineering (BSEE)
- Bachelor of Science in Computer Engineering (BSCpE)
- Bachelor of Science in Electronics and Communications Engineering (BSECE)
- Bachelor of Science in Industrial Engineering (BSIE)

=== College of Arts and Science ===
Offering a core of general courses, the college has four departments:

- Languages Department (English, Filipino, and Mass Communication)
- Mathematics Department
- Natural Sciences Department (Biology, Chemistry and Physics)
- Social Sciences Department (Economics, International Studies, Political Science, Psychology, and Sociology)

Bachelor of Arts (A.B.) in:

- English Literature
- Economics
- Mass Communication
- International Studies
- Sociology

Bachelor of Science (B.S.) in:

- Political Science
- Psychology
- Biology

=== School of Teacher Education ===
Courses offered:

- Bachelor of Elementary Education Major in General education (Gen.Ed)
- Bachelor of Secondary Education Major in English
- Bachelor of Elementary Education Major in Special education (SPED)
- Bachelor of Secondary Education Major in Mathematics
- Bachelor of Elementary Education Major in Early Childhood Education (ECE)
- Bachelor of Secondary Education Major in Physical Education, Health and Music (MAPEH)
- Bachelor of Secondary Education Major In Filipino

=== College of Rehabilitation Sciences ===
Courses offered:

- Bachelor of Science in Physical Therapy (BSPT)
- Bachelor of Science in Occupational Therapy (BSOT)
- Caregiver Course

=== College of Criminal Justice ===
The college was granted with the Permit No. 017 by the Commission on Higher Education (CHED), Region 10 to offer a four - year course leading to the degree of Bachelor of Science in Criminology. The College of Law Enforcement and Public Safety courses teach law enforcement, public security and safety, criminal investigation, criminology, and forensic science.

Course offered:

- Bachelor of Science in Criminology

=== College of Pharmacy ===
The first University in Northern Mindanao to offer a four-year course in Pharmacy. The first graduates received a Degree in Bachelor of Science in Pharmacy in March 2013.

The College of Pharmacy program is a four-year bachelor's degree program with a curriculum in pharmaceutical science, training for competency skills, development, and pharmaceutical research.

Course offered:

- Bachelor of Science in Pharmacy

=== College of Medical Laboratory Science ===
The college offers Medical Technology Education, which includes internship and specialized training.

Graduates of this program may go into:

- Clinical laboratory practice: Medical Technologists/Medical Laboratory Scientists in hospital laboratories, clinics and sanitariums.
- Education: Medical Technologists/Medical laboratory Scientists can be employed as faculty in colleges and universities offering Medical Technology/Medical Laboratory Science programs.
- Diagnostic industry/drug companies
- Medico-Legal Laboratory

◦Laboratory ◦Information system ◦Research

Course offered:

- Bachelor of Science in Medical Laboratory Science

=== College of Dentistry ===
Course offered:

- Doctor of Dental Medicine

== School of Graduate Studies ==
The school operates in trimesters. This mode enables the students, who are mostly professionals wishing to upgrade their qualifications, to finish the academic requirements within a shorter time.

The schedule of classes on weekends during the four months of every trimester provides the students with time to do research, projects, and other course requirements.

=== Post-graduate units ===
Doctor in Management (DM) - Major in Leadership Organization

=== Graduate degrees ===
- Master in Management (MM)
- Master in Management Major in Information Technology Management (MMITM)
- Master in Management Major in Instructional Systems Management (MMISM)
- Master of Arts in Education (MAEd)
  - Major in English Language Teaching (MAEd-ELT)

The Master of Arts in English Language Teaching (ELT) degree program focuses on models and methodologies in teaching English. The curriculum emphasizes practical and theoretical aspects of teaching English and linguistic skill development.

  - Major in Health Personnel Education (MAEd–HPE)
- Master/Diploma in Local Governance (M/DLG)

== Admission ==
Liceo de Cagayan University is open to students who meet the academic standards.

=== Foreign students ===
Foreign students may enroll in the undergraduate and graduate studies upon submission of Permit-to-Study or Student Visa F(9) and upon the compliance of the Commission on Higher Education (CHED), Bureau of Immigration and University requirements.

Foreign students whose native language is not English and/or whose undergraduate medium of instruction was in a language other than English are required either to take an English proficiency test as a pre-requisite for admission or to enroll in a special class in English for second language learners.

- Diploma

== Curricular offerings ==
During the first 25 years, the Liceo de Cagayan University was a tertiary-level institution offering courses in law, commerce, engineering and liberal arts. It was not until 1981 when the Basic Education Department, consisting of the primary and secondary levels, completed the three curricular levels that the university now offers.

The Liceo University pioneered in the offering of such courses as Nursing (both baccalaureate and graduate degrees), Physical Therapy, Radiologic Technology, Computer Engineering, Electronics and Communications Engineering, Tourism, and Computer Information Systems in Cagayan de Oro.

In 1998, the university became the first in the country to offer a graduate program, the Diploma/Master of Local Governance Scholarship Program funded by the Canadian government and the Civil Service Commission.

== Scholarship ==
=== Rodolfo N. Pelaez Scholarship ===
This scholarship entitles a student-applicant to a full free tuition.

=== For academic scholars ===
- Free textbooks/workbooks
- Free uniforms
- B. For Summa Cum Laude, Magna Cum Laude and Cum Laude Gtraduates
- Free review fee
- C. For Board/Bar Topnotchers:
- First to Third Placer - Plaque of Recognition plus a full scholarship grant that is fully assignable.
- Fourth to Tenth Placer - Plaque of Recognition plus partial (75%) scholarship grant that is fully assignable.
- Eleventh to Twentieth Placer - Plaque of Recognition plus a partial (50%) scholarship grant that is fully assignable.

== Campuses ==
=== Main Campus ===
The main campus of Liceo de Cagayan University is situated beside the Cagayan de Oro River and La Castilla Museum in Barangay Kauswagan. It houses most of the university's colleges, such as the School of Business Management and Accountancy, College of Engineering, College of Law, College of Criminal Justice, as well as the College of Arts and Sciences.

It is composed of nine buildings:

- North Academic Cluster
- South Academic Cluster
- East Academic Cluster (former site of the Heritage Building)
- West Academic Cluster (formerly known as the Arts and Science Building)
- Liceo Civic Center
- Rodelsa Hall
- Elsa P. Pelaez Memorial Library
- University Chapel
- Engineering Building
- Riverside Canteen

=== Rodolfo N. Pelaez Memorial Hall ===
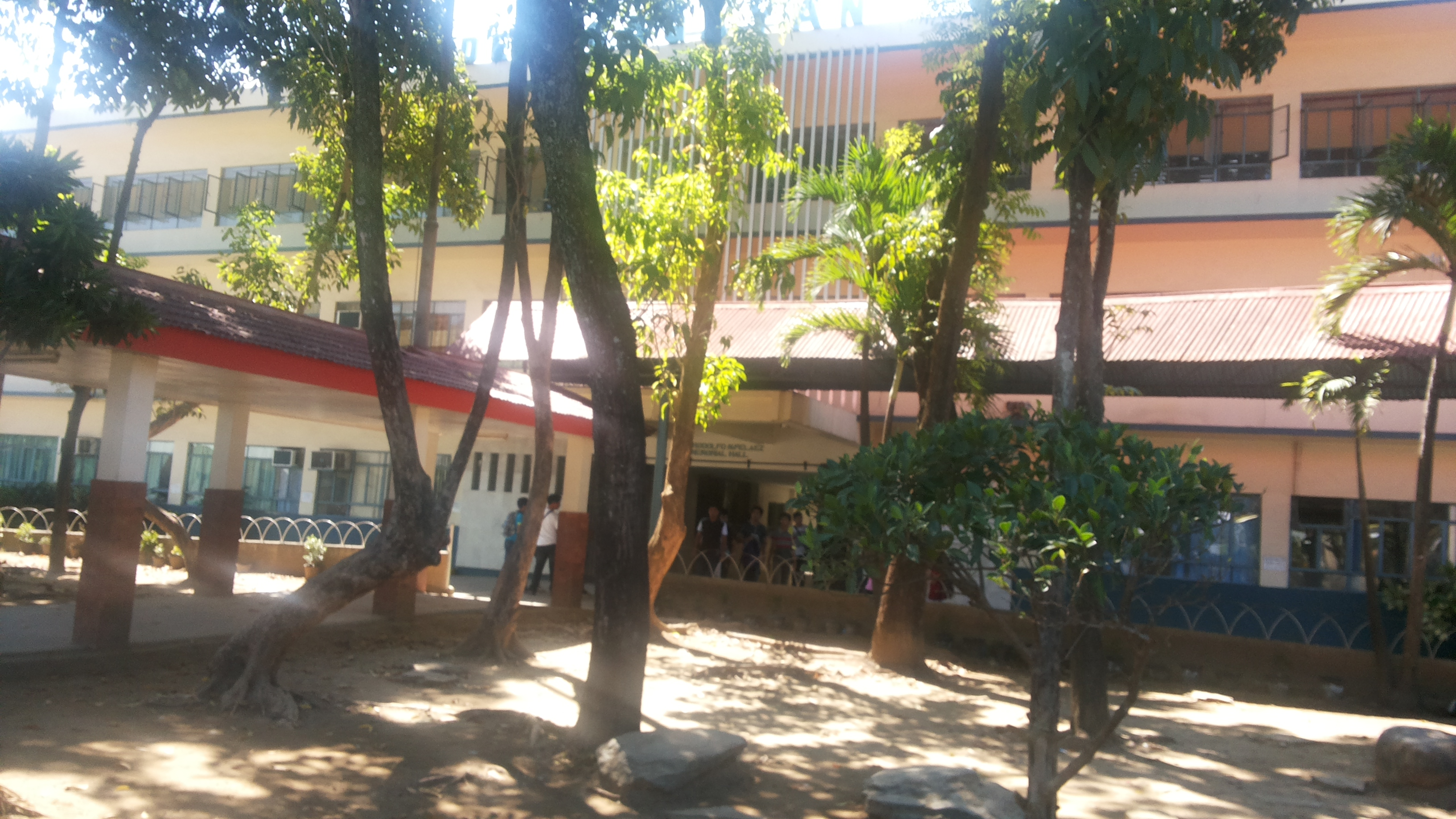
Liceo de Cagayan University Basic Education Department

The Rodolfo N. Pelaez Memorial Hall, also known as the RNP Campus, formerly served as Doctors General Hospital, is located in Barangay Carmen. It now houses the Basic Education Department, as well as the School of Teacher Education, having previously been home to the College of Rehabilitation Sciences and the College of Radiologic Technology prior to the opening of the Paseo del Rio Campus.

=== Dr. Jose Ma. R. Golez Memorial Institute of Medical Sciences ===
The Paseo del Rio Campus, renamed as the Dr. Jose Ma. R. Golez Memorial Institute of Medical Sciencesin early 2025, and locally referred to as the Paseo Campus, is located fronting the Rodelsa Circle in Barangay Macasandig. It was officially inaugurated in 2017 and currently houses the College of Rehabilitation Sciences and the College of Radiologic Technology, which were previously based at the RNP Campus. The campus serves as the home of the university's paramedical programs, including the College of Medical Laboratory Science, College of Nursing, College of Pharmacy, and the College of Dentistry.

The University's Paseo campus has been undergoing an extension of its facilities, expanding its capacity by adding additional rooms and facilities to the adjacent Platinum Building behind it. Originally a planned mixed-use condominium fronting the river, portions of the building have now been repurposed as part of the campus, housing additional classrooms, laboratories, and faculty offices.

== See also ==
- Xavier University - Ateneo de Cagayan
- Capitol University
- Mindanao University of Science and Technology
