= PCU Dolphins =

College basketball team

- School: Philippine Christian University
- League: NCAA South: 1999–present NCAA: 1996–2007; 2008-09; NAASCU: 2014–present UCAL: 2018–present
- Joined: 1996
- Location: Taft Avenue
- Team colors: Blue and silver
- Women's team: Lady Dolphins
- Juniors' team: Baby Dolphins

Seniors' general championships
- NCAA: 2 (2004-05, 2006-07)

Juniors' general championships
- NCAA: none

The PCU Dolphins are the senior athletic teams that represent Philippine Christian University. They are currently playing at the National Athletic Association of Schools, Colleges and Universities (NAASCU), after spending a leave of absence from the National Collegiate Athletic Association (Philippines) basketball.

Their 2004 title was their only NCAA basketball title. The juniors team are the Baby Dolphins while the women's team are the Lady Dolphins.

After the revelation in early 2007 that several of PCU's junior basketball players entered the university using fraudulent papers, the league suspended the school for the 2007-08. With the agreement that their seniors team can play on the 2008-09 season, the school took a voluntary leave of absence from the league starting at the 2009-10 season, in which they should re-apply their membership if ever they intend to return.

== Name ==
Originally, the PCU administration chose a killer whale, but they instead chose a mammal close to their heart, the dolphin. The Juniors (high school) team are the Baby Dolphins.

== Basketball ==
=== History ===
The PCU Dolphins entered the NCAA in 1996 headed by Orly Torrente (Seniors) and Karl de Guia (Juniors). Then known as the PCU Saints then went to the latter known, PCU Dolphins. They were known for their exemplary defense and hunger for the ball, leading to their only NCAA championship in 2004. The Dolphins' only problem is that they cannot seem to keep a head coach.

Players from the Baby Dolphins have left to join other college teams. These have included Ronjay Buenafe (EAC Generals), Rabeh Al-Hussaini (Ateneo Blue Eagles), James Mangahas (De La Salle Green Archers), Allan Mangahas (Mapua Cardinals), Jake Pascual (San Beda Red Lions) and Gabby Martinez.

=== PCU eligibility scandal ===
After allegations of identity switching circulated via text messaging, Philippine Christian University (PCU) was investigated by the Management Committee (MANCOM) for alleged eligibility infractions on several of its varsity teams. The MANCOM has completed its own investigation and are waiting for PCU's internal investigation and has hinted of suspending the Dolphins for Season 83 after PCU's representatives did not show up in the MANCOM meeting.

After the deliberation by the MANCOM, the NCAA, via a statement issued by NCAA and José Rizal University (JRU) President Vicente Fabella, suspended the Dolphins from all events after four players of the Baby Dolphins basketball team were found to have used falsified documents. The Baby Dolphins were ordered to return their second-place trophy from last season's tournament and all individual awards. The senior Dolphins' 2005-06 general championship trophy was retained, however.

=== Rivalries ===
- Letran Knights - Met twice in the Final 4 (PCU won both), once in the Finals (Letran won)
- San Beda Red Lions - Met once in the Finals (San Beda won and ended 28 years of Championship drought)

=== Juniors ===
- Allan Mangahas - Mapua Cardinals, 2005 NCAA Juniors MVP
- Ronjay Buenafe -EAC Generals, Meralco Bolts
- Rabeh Al-Hussaini - Ateneo Blue Eagles, Meralco Bolts, 2009 UAAP MVP, 2010 UAAP Finals MVP
- Niño Dayao- PCU Dolphins assistant coach, 2008
- Jake Pascual - San Beda Red Lions, Star Hotshots, 2006 NCAA Juniors MVP, Sinag Pilipinas (2011 SEA Games team)
- Wilson San Diego
- Mario Ronaldo Quijado
- Rafael Paul Doma
- CJ Isidoro
- Jose Castro Jr - PCU Baby Dolphins 2003 Rookie MVP
- Eugene Pohol
- Peter Buenafe
- Paul Buenafe
- Manuel Jimenez
- Nico Bagawisan
- Lloyd Burgos
- Gabriel Martinez
- Jett Vidal - Perpetual Altas
- Jeffrey Rosales
- John Paul Peter Palma
- Vonn Ryan Ramiro - 2 Sports Discipline Basketball and Track and Field - Gold Medalist Discus Throw Juniors 1999, 2000 and 2001 Bronze Medal 2000 Shot Put Juniors
- Antonio Mendenilla - Juniors Track and Field MVP 2003

=== Withdrawal from the NCAA ===
Rumors have leaked that PCU will not be with the NCAA at the start of the 85th season. Reasons for this are as follows: (note: the ff. reasons are still rumors)

- PCU plans to go to the UAAP
- PCU plans to go to other leagues such as NCRAA, CUSA, etc.
- PCU wants to rebuild and come back with a stronger lineup at the start of the 86th season, a season in which it will host.

There were talks of a possible PCU Dolphins comeback just before the 87th season started. The basketball team was rumored to be spearheaded by coach Ato Tolentino, who led the Dolphins to their first and only basketball championship back in 2004. The talks died because of financial issues within the PCU organization.

=== Season-by-season record ===
| Season | League | Elimination round | | | | | | Playoffs | | | |
| Season | League | Pos | GP | W | L | PCT | GB | GP | W | L | Result |
|---|---|---|---|---|---|---|---|---|---|---|---|
| 1996 | NCAA | 7th/7 | 12 | 0 | 12 | .000 | 10 | Did not qualify | | | |
| 1997 | NCAA | 7th/7 | 12 | 0 | 12 | .000 | 12 | Did not qualify | | | |
| 1998 | NCAA | 8th/8 | 14 | 0 | 14 | .000 | | Did not qualify | | | |
| 1999 | NCAA | 7th/8 | 14 | 5 | 9 | .357 | 4 | Did not qualify | | | |
| 2000 | NCAA | 7th/8 | 14 | 4 | 10 | .286 | 7 | Did not qualify | | | |
| 2001 | NCAA | 5th/8 | 14 | 7 | 7 | .500 | 4 | Did not qualify | | | |
| 2002 | NCAA | 3rd/8 | 14 | 9 | 5 | .643 | 2 | 2 | 1 | 1 | Lost semifinals vs Benilde |
| 2003 | NCAA | 8th/8 | 14 | 5 | 9 | .357 | 4 | Did not qualify | | | |
| 2004 | NCAA | 2nd/8 | 14 | 10 | 4 | .714 | — | 4 | 3 | 1 | Won Finals vs Perpetual |
| 2005 | NCAA | 2nd/8 | 14 | 10 | 4 | .714 | 3 | 4 | 2 | 2 | Lost Finals vs Letran |
| 2006 | NCAA | 2nd/8 | 14 | 10 | 4 | .714 | 3 | 5 | 3 | 2 | Lost Finals vs San Beda |
| 2007 | NCAA | Suspended | | | | | | | | | |
| 2008 | NCAA | 7th/8 | 14 | 3 | 11 | .214 | 8 | Did not qualify | | | |
| NCAA totals | | | 164 | 63 | 101 | .384 | | 15 | 9 | 6 | 1 championship |

== Other sports ==
- Roel Licayan (3-time gold medalist NCAA Lawn Tennis-Juniors Division)

== Championships won ==
=== Seniors ===
- Basketball - 1 (2004–2005), (3 straight Finals appearance in '04, '05, '06)
- Football - 3 (1998–1999, 1999–2000, 2000–2001)
- Track and Field - 1 (2005–2006)
- Swimming - 3 (1999–2000, 2000–2001, 2001–2002)
- Volleyball
  - (M) - 1 (2005, 2006)
  - (W) - 2 (2003–2004, 2004–2005)
- Table Tennis (W) - 1 (2004–2005)
- Beach Volleyball (W) - 1 (2004–2005)
- Total = 13 championships

=== Juniors ===
- Track and Field - 2 (2002–2003, 2004–2005)
- Table Tennis - 1 (2004–2005)
- Chess - 3 (2005–2006)
- Total = 6
