= 2018 Collegiate Basketball Awards =

- Date: June 21, 2018
- Location: The Bayleaf Hotel, Intramuros, Manila
- Country: Philippines

The 2018 Collegiate Basketball Awards was an awarding ceremony recognizing the champion teams, players and coaches from the University Athletic Association of the Philippines Season 80 and the National Collegiate Athletic Association Season 93 men's basketball tournaments and UAAP women's basketball tournaments. The CBA is organized by the UAAP Press Corps and the NCAA Press Corps, a group of sportswriters and reporters from print and online media who are covering the two top-tier collegiate leagues in the Philippines. UAAP Press Corps is headed by Reuben Terrado of Spin.ph and NCAA Press Corps is headed by Cedelf P. Tupas of Philippine Daily Inquirer.

The awarding ceremony was held at The Bayleaf Hotel, Intramuros, Manila on June 21, 2018.

Robert Bolick from the San Beda Red Lions was crowned as the Collegiate Player of the Year. Tab Baldwin and Boyet Fernandez, for their part received the Coaches of the Year honors. For the first time in the history of CBA, Afril Bernardino from the NU Lady Bulldogs was recognized as the first female awardee as she scored the Pivotal Player of the Year award.

== Awardees ==
Award	Recipient	Reference
Coach of the Year	Tab Baldwin (Ateneo Blue Eagles, UAAP Season 80)	
Coach of the Year	Boyet Fernandez (San Beda Red Lions, NCAA Season 93)	
Collegiate Player of the Year	Robert Bolick (San Beda Red Lions)	
Mythical Five	Robert Bolick (San Beda Red Lions)	
Mythical Five	Matt Nieto (Ateneo Blue Eagles)	
Mythical Five	Thirdy Ravena (Ateneo Blue Eagles)	
Mythical Five	CJ Perez (Lyceum Pirates)	
Mythical Five	Ben Mbala (DLSU Green Archers)	
Pivotal Player of the Year	Isaac Go (Ateneo Blue Eagles)	
Pivotal Player of the Year	Donald Tankoua (San Beda Red Lions)	
Breakout Player of the Year	Alvin Pasaol (UE Red Warriors)	
Special Citation	Lyceum Pirates (For scoring an 18−0 elimination round sweep in the NCAA Season 93)	
Award of Excellence	Afril Bernardino (NU Lady Bulldogs)	

== See also ==
- 2017 in Philippine sports
