= NCAA Season 93 basketball tournaments =

Basketball season

NCAA Season 93
- Host school: San Sebastian College – Recoletos
Men's Finals	G1	G2	Wins
Lyceum Pirates	87	82	0
San Beda Red Lions	94	92	2
- Duration: November 10–16
- Arena(s): Smart Araneta Coliseum
- Finals MVP: Donald Tankoua
- Winning coach: Boyet Fernandez (3rd title)
- Semifinalists: San Sebastian Stags; JRU Heavy Bombers
- TV network(s): ABS-CBN Sports and Action ABS-CBN Sports and Action HD
Juniors' Finals	G1	G2	G3	Wins
Mapúa Red Robins	68	91	74	1
La Salle Green Hills Greenies	74	81	75	2
- Duration: November 10–24
- Arena(s): Smart Araneta Coliseum; Filoil Flying V Center
- Finals MVP: JD Cagulangan
- Winning coach: Marvin Bienvenida (1st title)
- Semifinalists: Letran Squires; San Beda Red Cubs

The NCAA Season 93 basketball tournaments started on July 8, 2017, at Mall of Asia Arena, Pasay. This was the 93rd season of basketball for the National Collegiate Athletic Association (Philippines) (NCAA). Same as the last year's opener, the defending champions San Beda Red Lions will open their title defense bid as they will battle the season's hosts San Sebastian Stags at the first game, and at the second game the Arellano Chiefs will open their first season without Jio Jalalon as they take on the Mapúa Cardinals.

ABS-CBN Sports and Action will be covering the games for the third consecutive year.

== Format ==
- In the seniors and juniors' tournament, ten (10) teams will play in a double round-robin classification.
- Once teams are tied, tie-breaker games shall be held for either the first, second or the fourth seed if necessary.
- The scenarios after the elimination round ends are the following below:
  1. If no team sweeps the elimination round, the regular play-offs (Final Four) shall be used.
  2. If a team successfully sweep the elimination round, that team will gain an automatic bye to the finals and the stepladder play-offs shall be used.
- In the semifinals, the first and second seed shall earn a twice-to-beat bonus against their respective opponents. These teams shall only need to win once to advance to the finals; while the third and fourth seed teams will need to win twice to advance to the finals.
- The finals is a best-of-three championship series.

Tie-breaker classification rules
1. Head-to-head matchup in the two (2) rounds
2. Goal average between the tied teams
3. Overall goal average

Bai Cristobal was named basketball commissioner for this season.

== Teams ==
Men's teams
Team	College	Coach
Arellano Chiefs	Arellano University (AU)	(Philippines) Jerry Codiñera
Letran Knights	Colegio de San Juan de Letran (CSJL)	(Philippines) Jeff Napa
Benilde Blazers	De La Salle–College of Saint Benilde (CSB)	(Philippines) Ty Tang
EAC Generals	Emilio Aguinaldo College (EAC)	(Philippines) Ariel Sison
JRU Heavy Bombers	José Rizal University (JRU)	(Philippines) Vergel Meneses
Lyceum Pirates	Lyceum of the Philippines University (LPU)	(Philippines) Topex Robinson
Mapúa Cardinals	Mapúa University (MU)	(Philippines) Atoy Co
San Beda Red Lions	San Beda College (SBC)	(Philippines) Boyet Fernandez
San Sebastian Stags	San Sebastian College – Recoletos (SSC-R)	(Philippines) Edgar Macaraya
Perpetual Altas	University of Perpetual Help System DALTA (UPHSD)	(Nigeria) Nick Omorogbe

Juniors' teams
Team	High school	Coach
Arellano Braves	Arellano University (AU)	(Philippines) Tylon Darjuan
Letran Squires	Colegio de San Juan de Letran (CSJL)	(Philippines) Raymund Valenzona
EAC-IAC Brigadiers	Immaculate Concepcion Academy (IAC)	(Philippines) Marvin Bienvenida
JRU Light Bombers	José Rizal University (JRU)	(Philippines) Azlie Guro
La Salle Green Hills Greenies	La Salle Green Hills (LSGH)	(Philippines) Vic Lazaro
Lyceum Junior Pirates	Lyceum of the Philippines University – Cavite (LPU-C)	(Philippines) LA Mumar
Mapúa Red Robins	Malayan High School of Science (MHSS)	(Philippines) Randy Alcantara
San Beda Red Cubs	San Beda College Rizal (SBCR)	(Philippines) JB Sison
San Sebastian Staglets	San Sebastian College – Recoletos (SSC-R)	(Philippines) Mel Banua
Perpetual Junior Altas	University of Perpetual Help System DALTA (UPHSD)	(Philippines) Myk Saguiguit

=== Name changes ===
- The Commission on Higher Education granted university status to Mapúa Institute of Technology on May 18, 2017, renaming itself as "Mapúa University."

== Venues ==
Like most Metro Manila-centric leagues, most games are held in arenas rented by the league, with games serving as neutral venues. In an innovation dubbed as "NCAA on Tour", starting in the previous season, the NCAA will continue holding Thursday games hosted at the campus of one of the teams that are playing on that day.

=== Main venues ===
Arena	City
Araneta Coliseum	Quezon City
Filoil Flying V Centre	San Juan
Mall of Asia Arena	Pasay

=== NCAA on Tour venues ===
Arena	Host team	City
Arellano University Gym	Arellano Chiefs	Mandaluyong
Colegio de San Juan de Letran Gym	Letran Knights	Manila
Emilio Aguinaldo College Gym	EAC Generals	Manila
Mapua University Gym	Mapua Cardinals	Manila
San Sebastian College – Recoletos Gym	San Sebastian Stags	Cavite City
University of Perpetual Help System DALTA Gym	Perpetual Altas	Las Piñas

== Men's tournament ==
=== Elimination round ===
==== Team standings ====
Pos	Team	W	L	PCT	GB	Qualification
1	Lyceum Pirates	18	0	1.000	—	Advance to the Finals (Note: As Lyceum won all of their elimination round games, the stepladder format will be used instead of the regular Final Four format.)
2	San Beda Red Lions	16	2	.889	2	Proceed to stepladder round 2
3	JRU Heavy Bombers	11	7	.611	7	Proceed to stepladder round 1
4	San Sebastian Stags (H)	9	9	.500 (Note: Head-to-head point differential: San Sebastian +30, Letran –9, Arellano –21; fourth-seed playoffs: Letran 70–68 Arellano, San Sebastian 74–69 Letran)	9	Proceed to stepladder round 1
5	Letran Knights	9	9	.500	9	
6	Arellano Chiefs	9	9	.500	9	
7	EAC Generals	7	11	.389	11	
8	Benilde Blazers	4	14	.222 (Note: Head-to-head record: Benilde 2–0 Perpetual)	14	
9	Perpetual Altas (Note: Perpetual's first round win over Benilde was forfeited after its entire team wore the dark-colored uniforms over the light-colored ones that were assigned to them for this game.)	4	14	.222	14	
10	Mapúa Cardinals	3	15	.167	15	

Source: ABS-CBN Sports
Rules for classification: 1) winning percentage; 2) if tied for #2 or #4, one-game playoff; 3) head-to-head point differential; 4) overall point differential
(H) Hosts

==== Match-up results ====
	Round 1									Round 2								
Team ╲ Game	1	2	3	4	5	6	7	8	9	10	11	12	13	14	15	16	17	18
Arellano	Mapua school colors	SSC-R school colors	JRU school colors	Lyceum school colors	Letran school colors	EAC school colors	UPHD school colors	San Beda school colors	CSB school colors	JRU school colors	UPHD school colors	Lyceum school colors	Letran school colors	EAC school colors	San Beda school colors	CSB school colors	SSC-R school colors	Mapua school colors
Letran	Mapua school colors	EAC school colors	JRU school colors	San Beda school colors	Arellano school colors	CSB school colors	UPHD school colors	SSC-R school colors	Lyceum school colors	UPHD school colors	JRU school colors	Arellano school colors	Mapua school colors	SSC-R school colors	EAC school colors	Lyceum school colors	San Beda school colors	CSB school colors
Benilde	UPHD school colors	EAC school colors	San Beda school colors	Lyceum school colors	Letran school colors	Mapua school colors	SSC-R school colors	JRU school colors	Arellano school colors	San Beda school colors	Lyceum school colors	UPHD school colors	SSC-R school colors	Mapua school colors	JRU school colors	Arellano school colors	EAC school colors	Letran school colors
EAC	CSB school colors	Letran school colors	San Beda school colors	Mapua school colors	Arellano school colors	Lyceum school colors	JRU school colors	SSC-R school colors	UPHD school colors	SSC-R school colors	Mapua school colors	JRU school colors	Arellano school colors	Lyceum school colors	Letran school colors	San Beda school colors	CSB school colors	UPHD school colors
JRU	Lyceum school colors	UPHD school colors	Arellano school colors	Letran school colors	San Beda school colors	EAC school colors	CSB school colors	SSC-R school colors	Mapua school colors	Arellano school colors	Letran school colors	EAC school colors	San Beda school colors	UPHD school colors	CSB school colors	SSC-R school colors	Mapua school colors	Lyceum school colors
Lyceum	JRU school colors	San Beda school colors	SSC-R school colors	Arellano school colors	CSB school colors	UPHD school colors	EAC school colors	Letran school colors	Mapua school colors	Mapua school colors	CSB school colors	Arellano school colors	UPHD school colors	EAC school colors	SSC-R school colors	Letran school colors	JRU school colors	San Beda school colors
Mapúa	Arellano school colors	Letran school colors	UPHD school colors	EAC school colors	SSC-R school colors	CSB school colors	San Beda school colors	JRU school colors	Lyceum school colors	Lyceum school colors	San Beda school colors	EAC school colors	Letran school colors	CSB school colors	UPHD school colors	JRU school colors	SSC-R school colors	Arellano school colors
San Beda	SSC-R school colors	Lyceum school colors	CSB school colors	EAC school colors	Letran school colors	JRU school colors	Mapua school colors	UPHD school colors	Arellano school colors	CSB school colors	Mapua school colors	SSC-R school colors	JRU school colors	Arellano school colors	UPHD school colors	EAC school colors	Letran school colors	Lyceum school colors
San Sebastian	San Beda school colors	Arellano school colors	Lyceum school colors	UPHD school colors	Mapua school colors	CSB school colors	Letran school colors	EAC school colors	JRU school colors	EAC school colors	San Beda school colors	CSB school colors	Letran school colors	Lyceum school colors	JRU school colors	Arellano school colors	Mapua school colors	UPHD school colors
Perpetual	CSB school colors	JRU school colors	Mapua school colors	SSC-R school colors	Lyceum school colors	Letran school colors	Arellano school colors	San Beda school colors	EAC school colors	Letran school colors	CSB school colors	Lyceum school colors	JRU school colors	San Beda school colors	Mapua school colors	Arellano school colors	EAC school colors	SSC-R school colors

= Win; = OT win; = Win by forfeit; = Loss; = OT loss; = Loss by forfeit

==== Scores ====
Team	AU	CSJL	CSB	EAC	JRU	LPU	MU	SBC	SSC-R	UPHSD
Arellano Chiefs		75–82	87–81	79–85	73–72*	65–99	91–82	80–95	56–65	59–68
Letran Knights	84–73		92–76	83–80	62–65	68–75	75–78	74–81	79–75*	63–61
Benilde Blazers	65–95	86–89		64–74	53–81	55–98	74–69	52–76	71–101	20–0 (Note: Perpetual originally won this game 69–65. However, the league awarded Benilde a forfeit win (defined as a 20–0 win) as Perpetual wore the dark-colored uniforms instead of the light-colored ones that were assigned to them for this game.)
EAC Generals	79–84	78–84	84–94*		48–77	93–97	77–72	69–81	73–75	61–58
JRU Heavy Bombers	109–115**	77–68	90–77	84–88		75–96	68–59	48–54	73–62	68–54
Lyceum Pirates	94–92	81–69	83–69	86–74	100–63		97–74	96–91	78–73	76–58
Mapúa Cardinals	64–81	79–88	79–69	72–85	58–62	90–96		55–66	66–75	60–63
San Beda Red Lions	83–72	73–68	72–58	88–51	65–60	105–107**	88–70		76–67	57–53
San Sebastian Stags	79–85	95–64	73–61	81–69	58–60	73–78	97–70	65–76		65–68
Perpetual Altas	52–62	88–82*	55–83	81–83	52–85	83–94	71–76	50–55	60–80	

Legend: Blue = left column team win; Red = top row team win.
Matches with lighter background shading were decided after overtime.

=== Fourth seed playoffs ===
- As three teams were tied for #4, the two teams with the lowest head-to-head goal averages (Arellano and Letran) played in the first round of the fourth-seed playoff. The winner met San Sebastian for the right to enter the playoffs proper.

First round (Single-elimination)
Arellano	68
Letran	70

Second round (Single-elimination)
San Sebastian	74
Letran	69

==== Arellano vs. Letran ====
S+A

October 20
3:30 PM

Arellano Chiefs	68–70	Letran Knights
Scoring by quarter: 16–24, 20–14, 13–16, 19–16
Pts: Levi Dela Cruz 18; Rebs: Lervin Flores 11; Asts: Dela Cruz, Taywan, 3 each		Pts: Rey Nambatac 25; Rebs: Rey Nambatac 9 Asts: Bong Quinto 4

Filoil Flying V Center, San Juan

==== San Sebastian vs. Letran ====
S+A

October 24
3:30 PM

San Sebastian Stags	74–69	Letran Knights
Scoring by quarter: 18–16, 14–14, 21–24, 21-15
Pts: Michael Calisaan 36; Rebs: JM Calma 11; Asts: David, Ilagan 3 Each		Pts: Jeremiah Taladua 16; Rebs: Jeo Ambohot 12; Asts: Bong Quinto 7
San Sebastian advances to the Final Four

Mall of Asia Arena, Pasay

=== Bracket ===
Stepladder round 1 (Single-elimination)
3	JRU	73
4	San Sebastian	85

Stepladder round 2 (Single-elimination)
2	San Beda	76
4	San Sebastian	71

Finals (Best-of-three playoff)
1	Lyceum	87	82
2	San Beda	94	92

=== Stepladder semifinals ===
This stage is a single-elimination tournament.

==== (3) JRU vs. (4) San Sebastian ====
This is the first playoff appearance for JRU since 2015, and the first for San Sebastian since 2013.

S+A

October 27
3:30 PM

JRU Heavy Bombers	73–85	San Sebastian Stags
Scoring by quarter: 15–12, 19–29, 11–30, 28–14
Pts: Jed Mendoza 20; Rebs: Abdul Wahab Abdul Razak 9 Asts: Mendoza, Teodoro, 5 each		Pts: RK Ilagan 21; Rebs: Michael Calisaan 8 Asts: RK Ilagan 5
San Sebastian advances to the stepladder semifinals round 2

Mall of Asia Arena, Pasay

==== (2) San Beda vs. (4) San Sebastian ====
This is the 12th consecutive playoff appearance of defending champions San Beda.

S+A

November 7
3:30 PM

San Beda Red Lions	76–71	San Sebastian Stags
Scoring by quarter: 26–11, 18–20, 13–20, 19–20
Pts: Javee Mocon 23; Rebs: Javee Mocon 22; Asts: Jomari Presbitero 5		Pts: Jayson David 16; Rebs: Michael Calisaan 9 Asts: Gayosa, Costelo, 3 each
San Beda advances to the Finals

Mall of Asia Arena, Pasay

=== Finals ===
This is a best-of-three playoff. This is the first Finals appearance for Lyceum, and the 12th consecutive Finals appearance for San Beda. Lyceum's sweep of the elimination round broke San Beda's 11-year streak of being the #1 seed, and is the first sweep since San Beda did it in 2010.

S+A

November 10
3:30 PM

Lyceum Pirates	87–94	San Beda Red Lions
Scoring by quarter: 21–22, 29–23, 14–19, 23–30
Pts: CJ Perez 25; Rebs: Perez, Nzeusseu, 8 each Asts: JV Marcelino 4		Pts: Donald Tankoua 27; Rebs: Donald Tankoua 20; Asts: Franz Abuda 3

Smart Araneta Coliseum, Quezon City
Attendance: 10,469

S+A

November 16
3:30 PM

Lyceum Pirates	82–92	San Beda Red Lions
Scoring by quarter: 22–17, 25–24, 19–24, 16–27
Pts: CJ Perez 22; Rebs: Mike Nzeusseu 15; Asts: CJ Perez 5		Pts: Robert Bolick 18; Rebs: Donald Tankoua 17; Asts: Robert Bolick 6
San Beda wins series 2–0

Smart Araneta Coliseum, Quezon City
Attendance: 14,693

- Finals Most Valuable Player: Donald Tankoua (San Beda Red Lions)

=== All-Star Game ===
The Games of the NCAA All-Star were held last September 1 at the Filoil Flying V Center in San Juan. The event served as a transition event from the first round going into the second round. The Team Saints, composed of stars from Perpetual Help, San Beda, Letran, Benilde, and the season hosts, San Sebastian, defeated The Team Heroes, consisting of Arellano, Lyceum, Jose Rizal University, Emilio Aguinaldo College, and Mapua; 84–80. Prince Eze was named as the All-Star MVP who went double-double with 17 points, 14 rebounds, and 3 blocks.

S+A

September 1
04:00

Boxscore

Team Saints	84–80	Team Heroes
Scoring by quarter: 23–18, 22–23, 21–23, 18–16
Pts: Eze 17; Rebs: Eze 14; Asts: Nambatac 3		Pts: Perez 15

Filoil Flying V Center, San Juan

- All-Star Game MVP: Prince Eze (Team Saints)

=== Controversies ===
==== Wrong uniform ====
On July 11, 2017, The Altas were clad in maroon when they were scheduled to be donning their light uniforms. Hence, the league ruled that the University of Perpetual Help was ineligible to play in its matchup against the Blazers earlier in the day. Citing the rule which states, “any athlete whose playing uniform does not conform with the rules will be ineligible to participate in a given game/match”, the management committee overturned UPHSD's 69–65 win in favor of the Blazers.

=== Awards ===
NCAA Season 93 men's basketball champions
San Beda Red Lions
21st title, second consecutive title

- Most Valuable Player: CJ Perez (Lyceum Pirates)
- Rookie of the Year: Jaycee Marcelino (Lyceum Pirates)
- Mythical Five:
  - CJ Perez (Lyceum Pirates)
  - Sidney Onwubere (EAC Generals)
  - Javee Mocon (San Beda Red Lions)
  - Prince Eze (Perpetual Altas)
  - Mike Harry Nzeusseu (Lyceum Pirates)
- Defensive Player of the Year: Prince Eze (Perpetual Altas)
- All-Defensive Team:
  - Prince Eze (Perpetual Altas)
  - Sidney Onwubere (EAC Generals)
  - Mike Harry Nzeusseu (Lyceum Pirates)
  - Abdul Wahab Abdul Razak (JRU Heavy Bombers)
  - Christian Bunag (Mapúa Cardinals)
- Most Improved Player: Jed Mendoza (JRU Heavy Bombers)

=== Statistics ===
==== Season average leaders ====
Statistic	Name	Team	Average
Points	(Philippines) CJ Perez	Lyceum Pirates	19.3
Rebounds	(Nigeria) Prince Eze	Perpetual Altas	16.4
Assists	(Philippines) Robert Bolick	San Beda Red Lions	5.3
Steals	(Philippines) CJ Perez	Lyceum Pirates	1.9
Blocks	(Nigeria) Prince Eze	Perpetual Altas	2.6

== Juniors' tournament ==
=== Elimination round ===
==== Team standings ====
Pos	Team	W	L	PCT	GB	Qualification
1	San Beda Red Cubs	13	5	.722 (Note: Head-to-head point differential: San Beda +4, Mapúa –4)	—	Twice-to-beat in the semifinals
2	Mapúa Red Robins	13	5	.722	—	Twice-to-beat in the semifinals
3	Letran Squires	11	7	.611 (Note: Head-to-head point differential: Letran +16, San Sebastian –5, LSGH –11; fourth-seed playoff: LSGH 108–82 San Sebastian)	2	Twice-to-win in the semifinals
4	La Salle Green Hills Greenies	11	7	.611	2	Twice-to-win in the semifinals
5	San Sebastian Staglets (H)	11	7	.611	2	
6	Perpetual Junior Altas	8	10	.444 (Note: Head-to-head point differential: UPHSD +15, Arellano –15)	5	
7	Arellano Braves	8	10	.444	5	
8	Lyceum Junior Pirates	7	11	.389	6	
9	JRU Light Bombers	6	12	.333	7	
10	EAC–ICA Brigadiers	2	16	.111	11	

Source: ABS-CBN Sports
Rules for classification: 1) winning percentage; 2) if tied for #2 or #4, one-game playoff; 3) head-to-head point differential; 4) overall point differential
(H) Hosts

==== Match-up results ====
	Round 1									Round 2								
Team ╲ Game	1	2	3	4	5	6	7	8	9	10	11	12	13	14	15	16	17	18
AU	Mapua school colors	SSC-R school colors	JRU school colors	Lyceum school colors	Letran school colors	EAC school colors	UPHD school colors	San Beda school colors	CSB school colors	JRU school colors	Mapua school colors	Lyceum school colors	Letran school colors	EAC school colors	San Beda school colors	CSB school colors	SSC-R school colors	UPHD school colors
CSJL	Mapua school colors	EAC school colors	JRU school colors	San Beda school colors	Arellano school colors	CSB school colors	UPHD school colors	SSC-R school colors	Lyceum school colors	UPHD school colors	JRU school colors	Arellano school colors	Mapua school colors	SSC-R school colors	EAC school colors	Lyceum school colors	San Beda school colors	CSB school colors
EAC–ICA	CSB school colors	Letran school colors	San Beda school colors	Mapua school colors	Arellano school colors	Lyceum school colors	JRU school colors	SSC-R school colors	UPHD school colors	SSC-R school colors	Mapua school colors	JRU school colors	Arellano school colors	Lyceum school colors	Letran school colors	San Beda school colors	CSB school colors	UPHD school colors
JRU	Lyceum school colors	UPHD school colors	Arellano school colors	Letran school colors	San Beda school colors	EAC school colors	CSB school colors	SSC-R school colors	Mapua school colors	Arellano school colors	Letran school colors	EAC school colors	San Beda school colors	UPHD school colors	CSB school colors	SSC-R school colors	Mapua school colors	Lyceum school colors
LSGH	UPHD school colors	EAC school colors	San Beda school colors	Lyceum school colors	Letran school colors	Mapua school colors	SSC-R school colors	JRU school colors	Arellano school colors	San Beda school colors	Lyceum school colors	UPHD school colors	SSC-R school colors	Mapua school colors	JRU school colors	Arellano school colors	EAC school colors	Letran school colors
LPU–C	JRU school colors	San Beda school colors	SSC-R school colors	Arellano school colors	CSB school colors	UPHD school colors	EAC school colors	Letran school colors	Mapua school colors	Mapua school colors	CSB school colors	Arellano school colors	UPHD school colors	EAC school colors	SSC-R school colors	Letran school colors	JRU school colors	San Beda school colors
MHSS	Arellano school colors	Letran school colors	UPHD school colors	EAC school colors	SSC-R school colors	CSB school colors	San Beda school colors	JRU school colors	Lyceum school colors	Lyceum school colors	San Beda school colors	Arellano school colors	EAC school colors	Letran school colors	CSB school colors	UPHD school colors	JRU school colors	SSC-R school colors
SBC–R	SSC-R school colors	Lyceum school colors	CSB school colors	EAC school colors	Letran school colors	JRU school colors	Mapua school colors	UPHD school colors	Arellano school colors	CSB school colors	Mapua school colors	SSC-R school colors	JRU school colors	Arellano school colors	UPHD school colors	EAC school colors	Letran school colors	Lyceum school colors
SSC–R	San Beda school colors	Arellano school colors	Lyceum school colors	UPHD school colors	Mapua school colors	CSB school colors	Letran school colors	EAC school colors	JRU school colors	EAC school colors	San Beda school colors	CSB school colors	Letran school colors	Lyceum school colors	JRU school colors	Arellano school colors	Mapua school colors	UPHD school colors
UPHSD	CSB school colors	JRU school colors	Mapua school colors	SSC-R school colors	Lyceum school colors	Letran school colors	Arellano school colors	San Beda school colors	EAC school colors	Letran school colors	CSB school colors	Lyceum school colors	JRU school colors	San Beda school colors	Mapua school colors	Arellano school colors	EAC school colors	SSC-R school colors

= Win; = OT win; = Win by forfeit; = Loss; = OT loss; = Loss by forfeit

==== Scores ====
Results on top and to the right of the dashes are for first-round games; those to the bottom and to the left of it are second-round games.

Teams	AU	CSJL	EAC-ICA	JRU	LSGH	LPU-C	MHSS	SBC-R	SSC-R	UPHSD
Arellano Braves	—	86–79	83–65	80–79	77–79	85–95	75–78	67–60	86–80	67–75
Letran Squires	65–57	—	85–81	92–79	63–64	93–87	75–91	45–91	85–74*	78–68
EAC-ICA Brigadiers	70–81	85–86	—	75–84	59–82	77–111	60–99	69–105	77–97	65–72
JRU Light Bombers	86–84	87–91	92–85	—	55–76	87–94	94–82	77–70	60–71	78–79
La Salle Green Hills Greenies	63–71	83–89	77–81	80–73	—	88–87	71–78	82–78	71–73	20–0 (Note: LSGH originally won this game 64–60. However, the league awarded LSGH a forfeit win (defined as a 20–0 win) as Perpetual wore the dark-colored uniforms instead of the light-colored ones that were assigned to them for this game. As LSGH originally won the game, no material changes in the team standings were made.)
LPU Cavite Junior Pirates	89–82	64–76	92–58	94–88	83–90	—	98–102*	73–78	81–88	89–86
Malayan Red Robins	84–88	81–76*	82–68	92–88	71–62	81–77	—	81–87	70–63	94–74
San Beda Red Cubs	94–65	63–60	91–56	70–69	72–76	83–80	71–73	—	86–75	90–79
San Sebastian Staglets	88–81	67–66	80–62	76–84	71–67	101–91	81–80	78–85	—	59–70
Perpetual Altas	88–81	70–83	92–71	51–86	69–82	72–74	69–64	66–87	81–92	—

Legend: Blue = left column team win; Red = top row team win.

=== Fourth seed playoff ===
October 24
1:00 PM

San Sebastian Staglets	82–108	La Salle Green Hills Greenies
Scoring by quarter: 25–21, 24–24, 16–34, 17–29
Pts: Romel Calahat 15		Pts: JD Cagulangan 27
LSGH advances to the Final Four

Mall of Asia Arena, Pasay

=== Bracket ===
Semifinals (Top 2 twice-to-beat)
1	San Beda–Rizal	72	108
4	LSGH	83	110***
2	Malayan	82
3	Letran	80

Finals (Best-of-three playoff)
4	LSGH	74	81	75
2	Malayan	68	91	74

*Triple overtime

=== Semifinals ===
San Beda and Malayan have the twice-to-beat advantage; they only need to win once, while their opponents twice, to advance to the finals.

==== (1) San Beda vs. (4) LSGH ====
October 27
11:00 AM

San Beda Red Cubs	72–83	La Salle Green Hills Greenies
Scoring by quarter: 27–28, 17–20, 11–19, 17–16
Pts: Germy Mahinay 13; Rebs: 3 players, 5 each Asts: Evan Nelle 10		Pts: JD Cagulangan 27; Rebs: Joshua David 12; Asts: Joshua David 8

Mall of Asia Arena, Pasay

November 7
1:00 PM

San Beda Red Cubs	108–110 (3OT)	La Salle Green Hills Greenies
Scoring by quarter: 20–19, 12–17, 23–20, 23–22, Overtime: 30–32
Pts: Evan Nelle 26; Rebs: Germy Mahinay 17; Asts: Evan Nelle 8		Pts: JD Cagulangan 29; Rebs: Inand Fornillos 18; Asts: JD Cagulangan 9
LSGH series in two games

Mall of Asia Arena, Pasay

==== (2) Malayan vs. (3) Letran ====
October 27
1:00 PM

Mapúa Red Robins	82–80	Letran Squires
Scoring by quarter: 24–20, 20–19, 13–19, 25–22
Pts: Will Gozum 24; Rebs: Warren Bonifacio 16; Asts: Clint Escamis 7		Pts: Keifer Cordero 16; Rebs: Keifer Cordero 8 Asts: Keith Peralta 6
Malayan wins series in one game

Mall of Asia Arena, Pasay

=== Finals ===
November 10
1:00 PM

Mapúa Red Robins	68–74	La Salle Green Hills Greenies
Scoring by quarter: 20–19, 17–14, 15–26, 16–15
Pts: Will Gozum 16; Rebs: Will Gozum 19; Asts: Clint Escamis 5		Pts: Cagulangan, David, 17 each Rebs: Joshua David 14; Asts: Cagulangan, David, 5 each

Smart Araneta Coliseum, Quezon City

November 16
1:00 PM

Mapúa Red Robins	91–81	La Salle Green Hills Greenies
Scoring by quarter: 25–19, 30–27, 12–21, 24–14
Pts: Clint Escamis 25; Rebs: Warren Bonifacio 14; Asts: Escamis, Jabel, 4 each		Pts: JD Cagulangan 16; Rebs: Mark Sangco 8 Asts: JD Cagulangan 9

Smart Araneta Coliseum, Quezon City

November 24
3:00 PM

Mapúa Red Robins	74–75	La Salle Green Hills Greenies
Scoring by quarter: 19–15, 25–17, 12–21, 18–22
Pts: Clint Escamis 21; Rebs: Warren Bonifacio 20; Asts: Clint Escamis 4		Pts: Joshua David 27; Rebs: Cagulangan, Fornillos, 9 each Asts: JD Cagulangan 7
LSGH wins series 2–1

Filoil Flying V Center, San Juan

- Finals Most Valuable Player: JD Cagulangan (La Salle Green Hills Greenies)

=== Awards ===
NCAA Season 93 juniors' basketball champions
La Salle Green Hills Greenies
First title

- Most Valuable Player: Will Gozum (Mapúa Red Robins)
- Rookie of the Year: Inand Fornilos (La Salle Green Hills Greenies)
- Mythical Five:
  - Warren Bonifacio (Mapúa Red Robins)
  - Will Gozum (Mapúa Red Robins)
  - JD Cagulangan (La Salle Green Hills Greenies)
  - Inand Fornilos (La Salle Green Hills Greenies)
  - Aaron Fermin (Arellano Braves)
- Defensive Player of the Year: Aaron Fermin (Arellano Braves)
- All-Defensive Team:
  - Warren Bonifacio (Mapúa Red Robins)
  - Will Gozum (Mapúa Red Robins)
  - Inand Fornilos (La Salle Green Hills Greenies)
  - Aaron Fermin (Arellano Braves)
  - Romel Calahat (San Sebastian Staglets)
- Most Improved Player: co-winners, Clint Escamis and Neil Villapando (Mapúa Red Robins)

=== Controversies ===
==== Wrong uniform ====
On July 11, 2017, The Junior Altas wore their dark uniforms instead of light. The Juniors' standings did not change, however, as CSB-LSGH triumphed in that matchup.

== See also ==
- UAAP Season 80 basketball tournaments

Preceded by Season 92 (2016)	NCAA basketball seasons Season 93 (2017)	Succeeded by Season 94 (2018)
