= 2017 in Philippine sports =

The following is a list of notable events and developments that are related to Philippine sports in 2017.

== Events ==
=== Athletics ===
- December 3 — The national finals of the 41st National Milo Marathon to be held in Cebu City.

=== Basketball ===
==== Amateur ====
- January 17 – 2017 PBA D-League Aspirant's Cup opens at the Ynares Sports Arena, Pasig. UAAP Season 78 Finals MVP Jeron Teng, who scores 42 points, led AMA Online Education Titans in their victory over Team Batangas, 101–95.

==== Professional ====
- March 5 — The San Miguel Beermen defeat the Barangay Ginebra San Miguel in Game 5 of the PBA Philippine Cup Finals to win the series 4–1 and win their 24th PBA championship. Beermen Guard Chris Ross won the PBA Finals MVP award.
- April 26–30 – The annual 2017 PBA All-Star Week was held at the Xavier University Gymnasium in Cagayan de Oro (Mindanao), Quezon Convention Center in Lucena (Luzon), and in Hoops Dome in Lapu-Lapu City (Visayas)
- October 27 – Barangay Ginebra San Miguel wins the 2017 PBA Governors' Cup title, beating the Meralco Bolts. This is the second winning title of the said team.
- October 29 — Christian Standhardinger, was picked as the first overall selection for the San Miguel Beermen in the 2017 PBA Rookie Draft was held at the Robinsons Place Manila.

==== Collegiate ====
- November 16 – The San Beda Red Lions defeat the Lyceum Pirates, 92–82, and become the NCAA Season 93 men's basketball championship San Beda claimed their 21st Championship title
- December 3, Basketball – The Ateneo Blue Eagles were crowned the UAAP Season 80 men's basketball champions after clinching an 88–86 victory over the De La Salle University Green Archers at the Smart Araneta Coliseum.

==== National team ====
- January 22 – The Gilas Pilipinas management names 24 players (12 from each PBA teams, and another 12 were from Gilas Cadets) into the Philippines men's national basketball team pool for the 2017 SEABA Championship and the 2017 Southeast Asian Games.
- May 12–18 – The Philippines hosted the 2017 SEABA Championship.
- May 14–18 – The Philippines hosted the 2017 SEABA Under-16 Championship.
- October 12, Basketball – The Philippines dropped three rungs down to No. 30 but kept its solid position among the top tiers in the Asia/Oceania region in the latest world ranking released by the international basketball federation after the four continental cups.
- December 9, Basketball – The Philippines, together with Japan and Indonesia, won the hosting rights for the 2023 FIBA World Cup.

=== Boxing ===
- April 29 – Donnie Nietes becomes the new IBF world flyweight championship, defeating Thailand's Komgrich Nantapech via unanimous decision at the Pinoy Pride 40: Domination, at the Waterfront Hotel and Casino, Cebu City.
- July 2 – Dubbed as the "Battle of Brisbane", Jeff Horn kept his undefeated fight record after he had defeated Manny Pacquiao via a unanimous decision in a match held at the Suncorp Stadium, Brisbane, Queensland, Australia.
- August 1–8 – The Philippines hosted the Asian Junior Boxing Championship, with Puerto Princesa, Palawan was named as host city.
- September 16 – Milan Melindo defeats Hekkie Budler to retain his International Boxing Federation (IBF) light-flyweight title via a split decision at the Waterfront Casino and Hotel in Cebu City.
- September 24 – Nonito Donaire won the WBC silver featherweight title by gutting out a hard-fought decision against Ruben Garcia Hernandez. of Mexico at the main event at the Alamodome, San Antonio, Texas.

==== Collegiate sports ====
- January 10 – Bright Akhuetie, a former Perpetual Help Altas player transfers to the UP Fighting Maroons men's basketball team in the UAAP.
- March 7 – The NCAA Season 92 cheerleading competition and closing ceremonies held at the Mall of Asia Arena, Pasay.
- July 8 – The NCAA Season 93 was opened. The San Sebastian College-Recoletos become the Season Host.
- September 9 – The Far Eastern University become the Season Host of the UAAP Season 80
- December 2 – Adamson Pep Squad won the first UAAP Cheerdance Competition held in the SM Mall of Asia Arena.

=== Football ===
- May 6 – The first match of the inaugural season of the Philippines Football League, the country's first nationwide professional football league was played.

=== Esports ===
- May 25–28 The Philippines hosted the 2017 Manila Masters held at the Mall of Asia Arena.

=== Mixed martial arts ===
- January 9 – Chris Hofmann defends his Universal Reality Combat Championship (URCC) middleweight title after he beats David Douglas via first round TKO in URCC 29: Conquest in San Francisco, California.
- April 21 – Eduard Folayang retains his ONE lightweight championship in a unanimous decision over Ev Ting at ONE: KINGS OF DESTINY fight held at the Mall of Asia Arena in Manila.

=== Multi-sporting events ===
- February 19–26 – The Philippines competed in the 2017 Asian Winter Games in Sapporo and Obihiro, Japan. The team consisted of 29 athletes in three sports (four disciplines) and nine officials, which represented the largest Filipino delegation at the Asian Winter Games compared to the delegations sent in previous editions the Philippines participated in.
- April 23–29 – The Antique province hosted the 2017 Palarong Pambansa.
- August 19–30 – The Philippines competed at the 29th Southeast Asian Games held in Kuala Lumpur, Malaysia. The Philippines finished the 29th SEA Games in 6th place with a medal haul of 24 Golds, 33 Silvers and 64 Bronze which is the country's worst finish in 18 years. The next edition of the Southeast Asian Games will be hosted by the Philippines in 2019.

=== Poc and psc ===
- January 16 – The Philippine Sports Commission relaunches the Philippine Sports Institute in a formal ceremony held in the Philsports Arena.

=== Rugby union ===
- March 4 – The Philippines men's national rugby sevens team defeats Thailand 41–7 to win the Asia Rugby Sevens Trophy in Doha, Qatar.

=== Volleyball ===
- January 11 – Michele Gumabao announces that she will part ways with the Pocari Sweat Lady Warriors, currently playing in the Philippine V-League.
- January 12 − Larong Volleyball sa Pilipinas appoints Francis Vicente and Sammy Acaylar as coaches of the men's and women's volleyball team in the 2017 Southeast Asian Games.
- February 4 – The UAAP Season 79 volleyball tournaments officially opens at the Smart Araneta Coliseum.
- May 6 – The DLSU Lady Spikers climbed out of a 2–1 deficit to defend their UAAP Women's Volleyball title, 19–25 25–14 18–25 25–18 15–10, against Ateneo Lady Eagles in Smart Araneta Coliseum.
- June 15 – The Pocari Sweat Lady Warriors defeat the BaliPure Purest Water Defenders, in Game 3 of the first inaugural champions of Premier Volleyball League 1st Season Reinforced Open Conference, also win the series, 2–1, and Myla Pablo named as PVL Finals MVP.
- July 6 – Executive Secretary Salvador Medialdea issues Memorandum Circular No. 20, directing all government agencies and instrumentalities, including government-owned or controlled corporations, and encouraging local government units, to extend support to the 2017 Asian Women's Volleyball Championship.
- July 13 – The Petron Blaze Spikers won their 3rd straight championship title to defend their 2017 PSL All-Filipino Conference title, against F2 Logistics Cargo Movers at the Filoil Flying V Arena.
- August 9–17 – Metro Manila hosted the 2017 Asian Women's Volleyball Championship.
- December 16 − The F2 Logistics Cargo Movers won their second championship title in the 2018 PSL Grand Prix Conference against Petron Blaze Spikers in 4 games. Maria Jose Perez acclaimed the Finals MVP title.

=== Other events ===
- October 13 – TV5 Network Inc. rebrands its sporting division to ESPN 5 as part of a partnership with The Walt Disney Company and Hearst Corporation, the co-owners of ESPN Inc.; the rebranding was held to coinciding with the start of the 2017 PBA Governors' Cup Finals. Prior to the TV5-ESPN partnership, the ESPN branding was formerly used by Fox Networks Group Asia before rebranded to Fox Sports Asia in 2014.

== Awards ==
- January 26 – 2017 Collegiate Basketball Awards
- February 13 – 2017 PSA Annual Awards

== Deaths ==
January

- January 1 – Mel Lopez, Philippine Sports Commission (PSC) chairman (1993–96) and former Amateur Boxing Association of the Philippines (ABAP) president (b. 1935)

May

- May 31 – Ramon Campos Jr., Olympic basketball player (b. 1925)

June

- June 3 – Carlos "Bobong" Velez, head of Vintage Enterprises (b. 1945)

July

- July 9 – Reynan Capoy, 2006 CESAFI Jrs. MVP. (b. 1989)
- July 23 – Rocky Batolbatol, mixed martial artist. (b. 1984)

August

- August 6 – Eric Nadal Mediavillo, triathlete (b. 1971)

September

- September 17 – Cris Bolado, former PBA Player. (b. 1969)
- September 23 – Loreto Carbonell, Former Basketball player. (b. 1933)

October

- October 22 — Jeffrey Claro, super-flyweight boxer. (b. 1997)

November

- November 4 — Kid Santos, former FEU coach. (b. 1950.)
- November 19 — Elias Tolentino, basketball player. (b. 1942)

December

- December 21 – Mona Sulaiman, olympic sprinter (b. 1942)

== See also ==
- 2017 in the Philippines
- 2017 in sports
