= 2018 PSA Annual Awards =

- Date: February 27, 2018
- Location: Maynila Hall, Manila Hotel, Manila
- Country: Philippines
- Hosted by: Carlo Pamintuan; Rizza Diaz; Apple David

Television/radio coverage
- Network: Hyper
- Runtime: 2 hours

The 2018 SMC-PSA Annual Awards was an annual ceremony recognizing the athletes, teams, executives and personalities in the past year 2017. The awards is organized by the Philippine Sportswriters Association, a Philippine-based media organization composed of sports writers and reporters, section editors and columnists from print (broadsheet and tabloids) and online media. PSA is headed by Eduardo "Dodo" Catacutan of Sports Interactive Network Philippines.

The awards night, with the theme "A Night of Greatness", was held on February 27, 2018 at the Maynila Hall of the Manila Hotel in Ermita, Manila. The awards night was mainly sponsored by San Miguel Corporation, Milo, Philippine Sports Commission, Cignal and Tapa King.

Cue artist Carlo Biado, bowler Krizziah Lyn Tabora and boxer Jerwin Ancajas were awarded as the co-Athletes of the Year. PSC Chairman Butch Ramirez and Philippine Olympic Committee (POC) President Ricky Vargas attended the occasion.

Secretary of Agriculture and former sports columnist Manny Piñol was served as the guest speaker representing Philippine President Rodrigo Duterte.

== Honor roll ==
=== Main awards ===
The following are the list of main awards of the event.

Award	Winner	Sport/Team/Recognition	References
PSA-Tapa King Athlete of the Year	Carlo Biado	Billiards (World 9-Ball Championship champion and World Games gold medalist)	
PSA-Tapa King Athlete of the Year	Krizziah Lyn Tabora	Bowling (Bowling World Cup champion)	
PSA-Tapa King Athlete of the Year	Jerwin Ancajas	Boxing (IBF Junior Bantamweight champion)	
President's Award	Manuel V. Pangilinan (2023 FIBA World Cup Bid Team)	Basketball (Chairman Emeritus, Samahang Basketball ng Pilipinas)	
Lifetime Achievement Award	Augusto "Gus" Villanueva	Sportswriting (Editor in Chief, Journal Group of Publications and Former President, Philippine Sportswriters Association)	
Chooks-to-Go Mr. Fan Favorite (Manok ng Bayan)	Terrence Romeo	Basketball (Gilas Pilipinas and GlobalPort Batang Pier)	
Executive of the Year	Ramon S. Ang; Ernesto Echauz	Basketball/Volleyball (President and CEO, San Miguel Corporation); Sailing (Chairman and CEO, Standard Insurance / President, Philippine Sailing Association)	
National Sports Association (NSA) of the Year	Triathlon Association of the Philippines	Triathlon (Won two gold medals in Men's and Women's Triathlon events in the 2017 Southeast Asian Games)	
Mighty Sports Mr. Basketball	June Mar Fajardo	Basketball (Gilas Pilipinas and San Miguel Beermen, 4-time Philippine Basketball Association (PBA) Most Valuable Player)	
Ms. Volleyball	Dawn Macandili	Volleyball (DLSU Lady Spikers, F2 Logistics Cargo Movers and Philippines women's national volleyball team / Second Best Libero, 2017 Asian Women's Volleyball Championship)	
Mr. Volleyball	Marck Espejo	Volleyball (Ateneo Blue Eagles, 4-time UAAP Men's Volleyball Most Valuable Player)	
Mr. Golf	Clyde Mondilla	Golf (2017 Philippine Golf Tour Order of Merit Champion)	

=== Major awardees ===
These are the major awardees of the event. Sorted in alphabetical order.

Winner	Sport/Team/Recognition	References
Eric Cray	Athletics (2017 Southeast Asian Games gold medalist for Men's 400m Hurdles)	
Leo Austria	Professional Basketball (San Miguel Beermen head coach) (Coach of the Year in the PBA Leo Awards for three consecutive years)	
John Alvin Guce	Horse racing (Jockey of the Year)	
Mary Joy Tabal	Marathon (2017 Southeast Asian Games gold medalist for Women's Marathon)	
Masato Fernando	Motorcycle racing	
Milan Melindo	Boxing (Former IBF light-flyweight champion)	
"Sepfourteen"	Horse racing (Horse of the Year)	
Team Manila Softball	Softball (Pony International 18-U Girls Softball World Series champion)	
Thirdy Ravena	Collegiate Basketball (Ateneo Blue Eagles) (UAAP Season 80 Men's Basketball Champion)	
Trenten Beram	Athletics (2017 Southeast Asian Games gold medalist for Men's 200m and 400m)	

=== Special citations ===
The citations were given to the gold medalists of the Southeast Asian Games and the ASEAN Para Games both held in Kuala Lumpur, Malaysia in the period of August 19 to 30 and September 17 to 23, 2017.

2017 Southeast Asian Games gold medalists

Winner	Sport/Team/Recognition	References
Agatha Chrystenzen Wong	Wushu (Women’s Compulsory 3rd Taijiquan)	
Aries Toledo	Athletics (Men's Decathlon)	
Brennan Wayne Louie	Fencing (Men's Foil)	
Carlo Biado	Billiards and snooker (Men's 9-Ball Singles)	
Chezka Centeno	Billiards and snooker (Women's 9-Ball)	
Dines Dumaan	Pencak Silat (Men's Tanding (Match) Class A)	
Eric Shauwn Cray	Athletics (Men's 400m Hurdle)	
Eumir Felix Marcial	Boxing (Men's Middleweight)	
Gilas Pilipinas Cadets (Mike Tolomia, Troy Rosario, Bobby Ray Parks, Jr., Von Pessumal, Almond Vosotros, Kiefer Ravena, Kevin Ferrer, Raymar Jose, Kobe Paras, Carl Bryan Cruz, Baser Amer, Christian Standhardinger)	Basketball (Men's)	
John Marvin	Boxing (Men's Light heavyweight)	
Kaitlin De Guzman	Gymnastics (Women’s Artistic Uneven Bar)	
Kiyomi Watanabe	Judo (Women's -63kg)	
Marion Kim Mangrobang	Athletics (Women's Triathlon)	
Mariya Takahashi	Judo (Women's -73 kg)	
Mary Joy Tabal	Athletics (Women's Marathon)	
Nikko Bryan Huelgas	Athletics (Men's Triathlon)	
Philippines ice hockey team (Benjamin Imperial, Carlo Tenedero, Jan Regencia, Paul Sanchez, Gianpietro Issepi, Jorell Crisostomo, Jose Cadiz, Daniel Pastrana, Lenard Lancero II, Javier Cadiz, Paolo Spafford, Georgino Orda, Francois Gautier, Patrick Syquiatco, Hector Navasero, Steven Füglister, Julius Santiago, Miguel Serrano, Carl Montano and Joshua Carino)	Ice Hockey (Men's)	
Philippines lawn bowls team (Curte Guarin, Leoncio Carreon Jr., Ronald Lising and Emmanuel Portacio)	Lawn Bowls (Men's Fours)	
Philippines men's poomsae team (Dustin Jacob Mella, Raphael Enrico Mella, Rodolfo Reyes Jr)	Taekwondo (Men's Poomsae Team)	
Reyland Capellan	Gymnastics (Men’s Artistic Floor Exercise)	
Samuel Morrison	Taekwondo (Men's -74kg)	
Trenten Anthony Beram	Athletics (Men's 200m and 400m)	

2017 ASEAN Para Games gold medalists

Winner	Sport/Team/Recognition	References
Adeline Ancheta	Powerlifting	
Arthus Bucay	Cycling	
Cendy Asusano	Athletics (Women's Javelin Throw, Discus Throw, Shot put F54)	
Christopher Yue	Tenpin Bowling	
Cielo Honasan	Athletics (Women's Century Dash, 200m, 400m T44/46)	
Ernie Gawilan	Swimming	
Gary Beijino	Swimming	
Josephine Medina	Table Tennis	
Philippine men's chess team standard/rapid P1 (Sander Severino, Henry Roger Lopez, Felix Aguilera)	Chess	
Philippine men's chess team standard B2/B3 (Menandro Redor, Arman Subastre, Israel Peligro )	Chess	
Prudencia Panaligan	Athletics	
Rosalie Torrefiel	Athletics	
Sander Severino	Chess	

=== Minor citations ===
Winner	Sport/Team/Recognition	References
Donnie Nietes	Boxing (IBF World Flyweight Champion)	
Joey Antonio	Chess	
Margaret Ochoa	Jiu jitsu (2017 Asian Indoor and Martial Arts Games gold medalist)	
Annie Ramirez	Jiu jitsu (2017 Asian Indoor and Martial Arts Games gold medalist)	
Eduard Folayang	Mixed Martial Arts (former ONE Championship lightweight world champion)	
Ernest John Obiena	Athletics (Pole Vault)	
Carlos Yulo	Gymnastics	
Toni Leviste	Equestrian	
Kareel Meer Caniezo Hongitan	Archery	
Jan Paul Morales	Cycling	
Ivan Malig	Bowling	
Arnel Mandal	Wushu	
Divine Wally	Wushu	
Jomar Balangui	Wushu	
Pauline del Rosario	Golf	
Bianca Pagdanganan	Golf	
Elien Rose Perez	Weightlifting	
Veronica Ompod	Powerlifting	
Jacob Ang	Motosports (Karting)	
Milo Rivera	Motosports (Gymkana)	
Jovelyn Gonzaga	Volleyball (Cignal HD Spikers)	
Centennial III Sailing Team	Sailing	
Cignal	Basketball (PBA D-League) / Volleyball (PSL) / Sports broadcasting	
Ceres Negros F.C.	Football (2017 PFL season champions)	
Philippines national softball team	Softball	
Philippine Malditas women's football team	Football	
Shell National Youth Active Chess Championship	Chess	

=== Milo Junior Athletes of the Year ===
Award	Winner	Sport/Team/Recognition	References
Milo Male Junior Athlete of the Year	Maurice Sacho Ilustre	Swimming	
Milo Female Junior Athletes of the Year	Allaney Jia Doroy; Kyla Soguilon	Chess; Swimming	

=== Tony Siddayao Awards for Under-17 Athletes ===
Winner	Sport/Team/Recognition	References
Micaela Jasmine Moldeh	Swimming	
Marc Bryan Dula	Swimming	
Jerald Jacinto	Swimming	
Francis Obiena	Athletics (Pole Vault)	
Veruel Verdadero	Athletics (100m Dash)	
Jose Jerry Belibestre	Athletics (Long Jump)	
Kenneth Dela Pena	Amateur Boxing	
John Vincent Pangga	Amateur Boxing	
Bryan Otico	Tennis	
Alexandra Eala	Tennis	
Juan Francisco Baniqued	Triathlon	
Karen Manayon	Triathlon	
Al-Basher Buto	Chess	
Jerlyn Mae San Diego	Chess	
Mary Angeline Alcantara	Taekwondo	
Johnzenth Gajo	Wushu	
Mark Lester Ragay	Wushu	

== See also ==
- 2017 in Philippine sports
