= 1990 PBA draft =

Player selection in Philippine basketball

General information
- Date: January 10, 1990
- Location: The ULTRA, Pasig
- Network: Vintage Sports on PTV

Overview
- League: Philippine Basketball Association
- First selection: Peter Jao (Presto Tivolis)

The 1990 Philippine Basketball Association (PBA) rookie draft was an event at which teams drafted players from the amateur ranks. The annual rookie draft was held on January 10, 1990, at the ULTRA.

== Round 1 ==
Pick	Player	Country of origin*	PBA team	College
1	Peter Jao	Philippines	Presto Tivoli	San Jose
2	Alejandro de Guzman	Philippines	Pop Cola Sizzlers	Far Eastern
3	Gilbert Reyes, Jr.	Philippines	Pepsi Cola	Ateneo de Manila
4	Vegildo Babilonia	Philippines	Purefoods Hotdogs	Santo Tomas
5	Richard Bognot	Philippines	Formula Shell	
6	Hilario Villanil	Philippines	Añejo Rum 65ers	Visayas
7	Vernie Villarias	Philippines	Purefoods Hotdogs	East
8	Edgardo Postanes	Philippines	San Miguel Beermen	Far Eastern

== Round 2 ==
Pick	Player	Country of origin*	PBA team	College
9	Gerald Esplana	Philippines	Presto Tivoli	Far Eastern
10	Napoleon Hatton	Philippines	Pop Cola Sizzlers	San Sebastian
11	Jose Cadel Mosqueda	Philippines	Pepsi Cola	Arellano
12	Macario Torres	Philippines	Alaska Air Force	Far Eastern
13	Aristotle Franco	Philippines	Formula Shell	Lyceum
14	Fernando Libed	Philippines	Añejo Rum 65ers	Letran
15	Carlito Mejos	Philippines	Purefoods Hotdogs	Visayas
16	Romeo Lopez	Philippines	San Miguel Beermen	Arellano

== Round 3 ==
Pick	Player	Country of origin*	PBA team	College
17	Joey Mendoza	Philippines	Presto Tivoli	UP Diliman
18	Edgar Macaraya	Philippines	Pop Cola Sizzlers	San Sebastian
19	Loreto Manaog	Philippines	Alaska Air Force	
20	Aurelio Gamit	Philippines	Formula Shell	
21	Louie Alas	Philippines	Purefoods Hotdogs	Adamson
22	Josel Angeles	Philippines	San Miguel Beermen	Lyceum

== Round 4 ==
Pick	Player	Country of origin*	PBA team	College
23	Ruel Papa	Philippines	Presto Tivoli	Manila
24	Ferdinand Santos	Philippines	Pop Cola Sizzlers	FEATI
25	David Zamar	Philippines	Alaska Air Force	East

== Notes ==
- Purefoods acquired Alaska's first round pick in a trade involving Abet Guidaben.
- Purefoods traded rookie picks Villarias and Mejos to Pepsi for first and second picks in the 1991 draft.
- Purefoods' other pick, Louie Alas, never played in the PBA due to a career-ending ACL injury. However, he became an assistant coach of Purefoods in 1997.
