= Robert Bolick =

Filipino basketball player (born 1995)

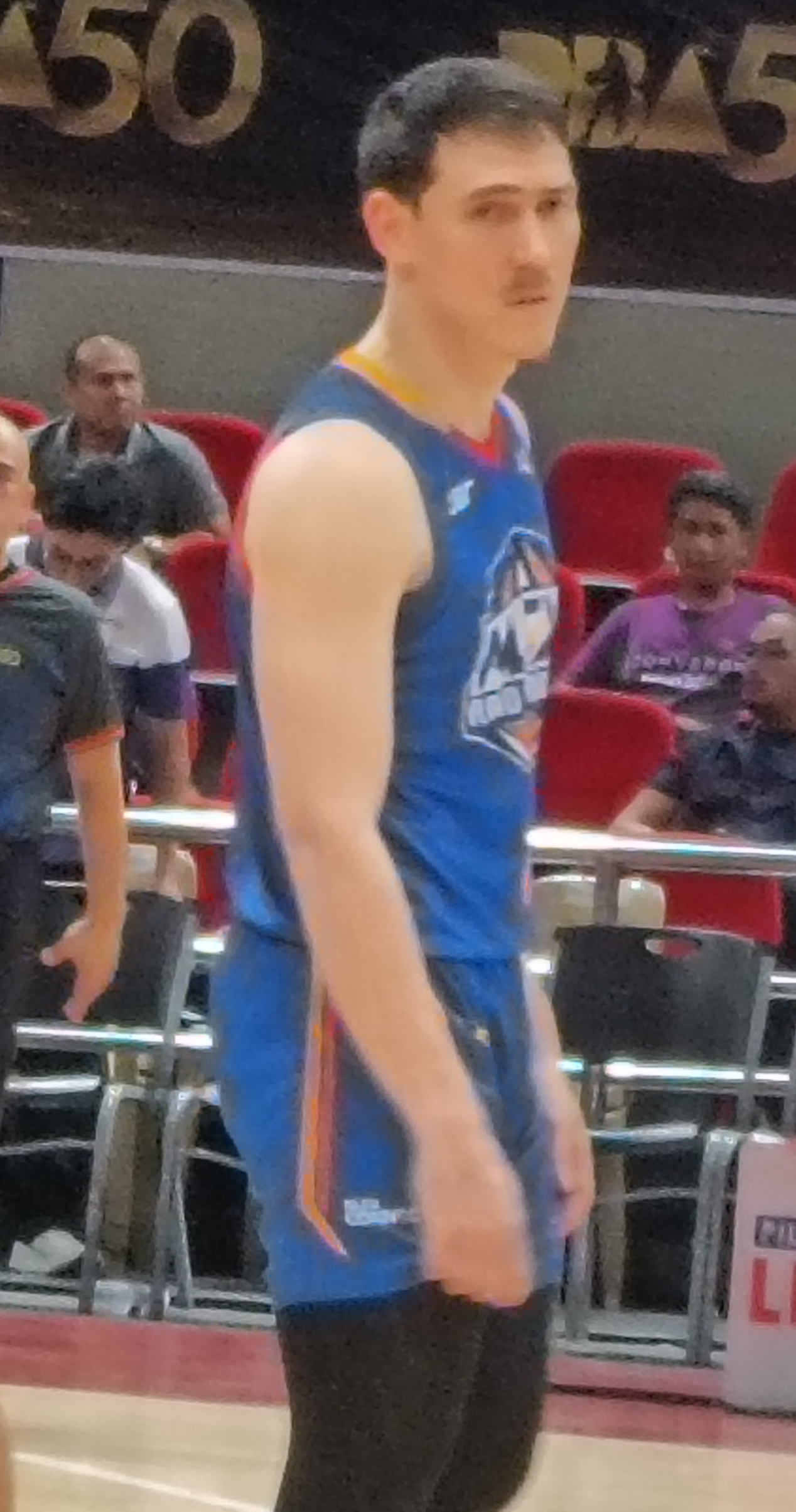
- Bolick in 2025

No. 8 – NLEX Road Warriors
- Position: Point guard / shooting guard
- League: PBA

Personal information
- Born: September 13, 1995 (age 31) Leyte, Philippines
- Listed height: 6 ft 1 in (1.85 m)
- Listed weight: 178 lb (81 kg)

Career information
- High school: La Salle Green Hills (Mandaluyong)
- College: De La Salle (2013–2014); San Beda (2015–2018)
- PBA draft: 2018: 1st round, 3rd overall pick
- Drafted by: NorthPort Batang Pier
- Playing career: 2019–present

Career history
- 2019–2023: NorthPort Batang Pier
- 2023: Fukushima Firebonds
- 2023–present: NLEX Road Warriors

Career highlights
- 3× PBA All-Star (2023, 2024, 2026); PBA All-Star Game Co-MVP (2024); PBA First Mythical Team (2025); 2× PBA Second Mythical Team (2021, 2023); PBA All-Rookie Team (2019); PBA Co-Order of Merit (2021); PBA scoring champion (2024); 3× NCAA Philippines champion (2016–2018); 2× NCAA Philippines All-Star (2017, 2018); NCAA Philippines Mythical Team (2018); NCAA Philippines scoring champion (2018); NCAA Philippines assists leader (2017); UAAP champion (2013); PBA D-League Aspirant's Cup champion (2017); PBA D-League Aspirant's Cup MVP (2017); Filoil Flying V Preseason Cup champion (2017); Filoil Flying V Preseason Cup Mythical 5 (2017); Fr. Martin Cup Division 2 champion (2016); CBA Collegiate Player of the Year (2018); CBA Mythical Five (2018); CBA Impact Player of the Year (2017)

Robert Lee Espina Bolick Jr. (born September 13, 1995) is a Filipino professional basketball player for the NLEX Road Warriors of the Philippine Basketball Association (PBA). He played college basketball for the San Beda Red Lions of the National Collegiate Athletic Association of the Philippines. He plays both point guard and shooting guard positions.

== High school career ==
Bolick played for the La Salle Green Hills Greenies from 2011 to 2012. Bolick averaged a team-high 20.3 points for the Greenies, including a season-best 41 points against Perpetual Help in his last season. He also posted marks of 5.2 rebounds, 4.2 assists, 2.6 steals, and 1.2 blocks per outing during his last season for the Greenies.

== College career ==
=== De La Salle Green Archers ===
Bolick started his collegiate career in the UAAP playing for the De La Salle Green Archers in 2013. During the off-season prior, the Green Archers continued its recruiting binge for the next UAAP season by obtaining the commitment of another blue-chip high school prospect in the likeness of Robert Bolick. Head coach Gee Abanilla confirmed he had already expressed his intention to suit up for the Green Archers, following in the footsteps of Bacolod sensation Kib Montalbo.

==== Transfer from La Salle to San Beda ====
Prior to leaving the Green Archers in 2015, Bolick was a part of the La Salle squad that won the Season 76 UAAP championship, but his playing time dropped in Season 77, as he averaged 9.1 minutes per game, averaging 1.8 points per contest. He had several options after deciding to leave the Green Archers but eventually opted to move to the reigning NCAA champions San Beda Red Lions. Bolick practiced with University of the Philippines and Ateneo de Manila University, and said he felt welcomed in both squads. But in the end, he chose San Beda University (then San Beda College) because he could not pass up the opportunity to play for head coach Jamike Jarin. Bolick underwent a one-year residency period and was eligible to play for San Beda in 2016, the year after former star point guard Baser Amer graduated.

=== San Beda Red Lions ===
Bolick finally joined the Red Lions' lineup in 2016. He emerged as the unlikely face of the multi-titled San Beda team, beginning in the playoffs last season when he took over in the semifinals against University of Perpetual Help, before standing toe to toe with the prolific Jiovani Jalalon and Arellano in the finals. He helped the Red Lions gain their first title since 2014, and their sixth championship in seven years, earning himself the nickname "Beastmode Bolick". He was named the collegiate Impact Player of the Year at the 2017 Collegiate Basketball Awards.

He started out his second season in San Beda averaging 13.7 points per outing before their game against the College of St. Benilde Blazers in which he, along with two other players were disqualified after a scuffle. The disqualification was especially costly for Bolick, who was in the running for MVP and Mythical Team honors. As per NCAA rules, a player who is ejected from a game is automatically disqualified from individual awards. All three players were also automatically suspended for their next games. In an interview with ABS-CBN, head coach Boyet Fernandez stated, "Bakit naman ito-throw out mo 'yung tao? Diyos ko naman. The guy was running for MVP. He destroyed the future of that guy." He exited the game with 14 points, 11 assists, and seven rebounds.

Having both their two losses in the elimination round coming from the Lyceum Pirates, who just came off their historic 18-0 elimination sweep, the odds were against them in the finals. However, Bolick was the difference maker for San Beda by heavily contributing to their finals sweep. In their first game, he finished with 18 points, 7 in the fourth-quarter fightback where his passing also keyed two critical baskets that led to the Red Lions' hot finish. After drilling the 3-pointer that gave San Beda an 89–82 lead with 50 seconds remaining, adrenaline took over Bolick, who celebrated the shot with the so-called "reverse raise-the-roof" gesture popularized by LeBron James. He was similarly stoked late in Game 1, when he kept making plays and no defender was able to contain him. In game 2, he had 24 points, 11 of which came in the fourth quarter. He finished the job started by Donald Tankoua, who kept San Beda in the game for the first three periods and had 27 points and 20 boards, bagging the Red Lions their 21st title and their 3rd back-to-back championship in 12 years.

=== College statistics ===
†	Denotes seasons in which Bolick won a championship
	Led the league

Year	Team	GP	MPG	FG%	3P%	FT%	RPG	APG	SPG	BPG	PPG
2013 †	La Salle	8	2.9	0	0	0	0.5	0.4	0.1	0	0
2014	La Salle	13	9.1	.214	.133	1.00	0.7	0.6	0.2	0.1	1.8
2016 †	San Beda	TBC	TBC	TBC	TBC	TBC	TBC	TBC	TBC	TBC	TBC
2017 †	San Beda	17	29.15	.412	.333	.717	6.38	5.3	.46	.08	12.54
2018 †	San Beda	18	TBC	TBC	TBC	TBC	TBC	TBC	TBC	TBC	18.7

==== Playoffs ====
Year	Team	GP	MPG	FG%	3P%	FT%	RPG	APG	SPG	BPG	PPG
2016 †	San Beda	5	27.93	.628	.5	.95	6.4	3	.4	.2	17.2
2017 †	San Beda	3	34.44	.473	.67	.793	4.33	4	1	.33	21
2018 †	San Beda	3	37.22	.28	.293	.75	3	9	.66	.33	13

== Amateur career ==
Bolick continued his rise by winning the PBA D-League Aspirant's Cup MVP award with the Cignal HD-San Beda Hawkeyes, defeating Racal Ceramica in three games winning the 2017 PBA D-League Aspirant's Cup Championship.

== Professional career ==
=== NorthPort Batang Pier (2019–2023) ===
Bolick was picked third overall by the NorthPort Batang Pier of the Philippine Basketball Association in the 2018 PBA draft. Bolick signed a two-year max contract with NorthPort just a couple of days after being selected as the third overall pick by the Batang Pier in the 2018 PBA Rookie Draft.

In his first game, he scored 10 points in his first six minutes in the PBA, had nine in the third quarter before adding the finishing touches in the final frame including a tough step back jumper from the deep right corner in front of his team's bench. He debuted with a game-high 26 points on 10-of-12 shooting from the field on top of three rebounds and three assists in close to 36 minutes of play, setting a franchise record for most points scored by a rookie in a debut.

With teammates Stanley Pringle and Sean Anthony out due to injuries, he became the Batang Pier's first option and was named as the Player of the Week and the unanimous Rookie of the Month for June 2019.

On February 1, 2022, Bolick became a restricted free agent after his contract expired and he did not sign an extension with NorthPort. He eventually signed a new one-year maximum contract with NorthPort on February 11. On February 1, 2023, Bolick once again became a restricted free agent after his previous contract expired, but he signed a new one-conference contract with NorthPort on February 8.

=== Fukushima Firebonds (2023) ===
On May 15, 2023, Bolick moved overseas for the first time as he signed with Fukushima Firebonds of the B2 League. His contract is for two years with the second year being a player option.

On October 19, 2023, he was released by the team as per his request. He rescinded his ties with the Firebonds to tend to his pregnant wife. He only played one game for the team before being released.

=== NLEX Road Warriors (2023–present) ===
On December 11, 2023, Bolick's PBA playing rights was traded to the NLEX Road Warriors in a three-team trade involving NLEX, NorthPort, and San Miguel Beermen. On December 17, he officially signed a three-year contract with the team.

== PBA career statistics ==
Legend
GP	Games played	MPG	Minutes per game	FG%	Field-goal percentage
3FG%	3-point field-goal percentage	4P%	4-point field-goal percentage	FT%	Free-throw percentage
RPG	Rebounds per game	APG	Assists per game	SPG	Steals per game
BPG	Blocks per game	PPG	Points per game	127	Career high

As of the end of 2024–25 season

Led the league

=== Season-by-season averages ===
Year	Team	GP	MPG	FG%	3P%	4P%	FT%	RPG	APG	SPG	BPG	PPG
2019	NorthPort	32	34.2	.385	.274	—	.792	5.1	4.9	.9	.3	13.5
2021	NorthPort	22	41.2	.402	.261	—	.750	6.9	8.2	1.4	.2	19.1
2022–23	NorthPort	29	38.3	.435	.305	—	.828	5.0	6.1	.7	.1	20.4
2023–24	NLEX	16	38.7	.444	.296	—	.875	5.3	7.5	.9	.1	25.3
2024–25	NLEX	40	38.3	.441	.305	.222	.858	5.4	7.6	1.0	.2	20.6
Career		139	37.9	.423	.287	.222	.830	5.5	6.7	.9	.2	19.2

== Personal life ==
Bolick is married to Cassandra Yu, a social media influencer and flight attendant, since May 2022. He was previously in a relationship with volleyball player Aby Maraño from 2013 to 2021.
