= Will Gozum =

Filipino basketball player (born 1999)

No. 0 – Phoenix Super LPG Fuel Masters
- Position: Power forward
- League: PBA

Personal information
- Born: April 8, 1999 (age 27) Concepcion, Tarlac, Philippines
- Listed height: 6 ft 6 in (1.98 m)
- Listed weight: 205 lb (93 kg)

Career information
- High school: UPIS (Quezon City); Malayan (Manila)
- College: UP (2018–2020); Benilde (2020–2023)
- PBA draft: 2025: 1st round, 8th overall pick
- Drafted by: Phoenix Fuel Masters

Career history
- 2021: Nueva Ecija Rice Vanguards
- 2023: Pampanga Royce
- 2023–2025: Quezon Huskers/Titans
- 2026–present: Phoenix Super LPG Fuel Masters

Career highlights
- PSL champion (2024); AsiaBasket First Team (2023 Las Piñas); NCAA Philippines Most Valuable Player (2022)

Will Allen Gozum (born April 8, 1999) is a Filipino professional basketball player for the Phoenix Super LPG Fuel Masters of the Philippine Basketball Association (PBA).

After earning MVP honors for the Malayan Red Robins in the juniors tournament of NCAA Season 93 in 2017, Gozum committed to the play for the UP Fighting Maroons in 2018. In 2020, he left UP and joined the Benilde Blazers, where he would win MVP honors in NCAA Season 98 after leading Benilde to the finals.

Gozum had his first professional stint in 2021 with the Nueva Ecija Rice Vanguards of the Maharlika Pilipinas Basketball League (MPBL) during the 2021 MPBL Invitational. In 2023, he joined the expansion Quezon Huskers.

== High school and college career ==
Gozum first played his high school career with the UPIS Junior Fighting Maroons before moving to the Malayan Red Robins in 2016, where he won a championship with the team in NCAA Season 92. In the following Season 93 in 2017, he won the Most Valuable Player award after leading his team to the finals, where they lost to the La Salle Green Hills Greenies.

On February 2, 2018, Gozum announced his commitment to the UP Fighting Maroons beginning with UAAP Season 81, but did not get much playing time in his return to UP. On January 12, 2020, Gozum left UP. Later that month on January 23, 2020, he returned to the NCAA, this time with the Benilde Blazers, and would be eligible beginning NCAA Season 97. In Season 98, he would lead Benilde to their first finals appearance since Season 78 in 2002 on his way to earning the Most Valuable Player award. In 2023, Gozum would play his final season with Benilde in NCAA Season 99, although he was left undecided prior to it after sustaining an injury during practice.

== Professional career ==
=== Nueva Ecija Rice Vanguards (2021) ===
Before his debut with the Benilde Blazers, Gozum was part of the Nueva Ecija Rice Vanguards of the Maharlika Pilipinas Basketball League for the 2021 MPBL Invitational. He averaged 8.6 points and 4.9 rebounds for the eventual runners-up.

=== Pampanga Royce (2023) ===
Gozum had a short stint with the Pampanga Royce of the Pilipinas Super League, averaging 7.3 points in nine games throughout the season.

=== Quezon Huskers (2023–2025) ===
In 2023, Gozum returned to the MPBL, this time with the expansion Quezon Huskers. In four games during the 2023 season, Gozum averaged 10 points and 7.5 rebounds. After the end of his college career, Gozum returned to the Quezon franchise as a full-time player as they entered the President's Cup of the Pilipinas Super League (PSL). He would go on to win his first professional championship following Quezon's triumph over his former team, Nueva Ecija, in the finals.

On May 25, 2024, during a game against the Batangas City Tanduay Rum Masters, Will suffered a major left knee injury after a steal during the fourth quarter of the game. Four days later on May 29, Quezon announced that he would miss the rest of the 2024 MPBL season.

=== Phoenix Super LPG Fuel Masters (2026–present) ===
On August 22, 2025, Gozum declared for the PBA season 50 draft, where he was selected eighth overall by the Phoenix Fuel Masters.

On February 7, 2026, Gozum signed a rookie contract with Phoenix.

== Career statistics ==
Legend
GP	Games played	MPG	Minutes per game	FG%	Field-goal percentage
3FG%	3-point field-goal percentage	4P%	4-point field-goal percentage	FT%	Free-throw percentage
RPG	Rebounds per game	APG	Assists per game	SPG	Steals per game
BPG	Blocks per game	PPG	Points per game	127	Career high

As of the end of 2025–26 season

=== PBA ===
Year	Team	GP	MPG	FG%	3P%	4P%	FT%	RPG	APG	SPG	BPG	PPG
2025–26	Phoenix Super LPG	9	10.5	.424	.333	—	.667	1.8	.7	—	.2	3.8

=== MPBL ===
Year	Team	GP	GS	MPG	FG%	3P%	FT%	RPG	APG	SPG	BPG	PPG
2023	Quezon	4	1	20.5	.464	.333	.800	7.5	1.3	0.5	0.5	10.0
2024	Quezon	8	3	16.9	.473	.200	.706	4.6	1.5	0.3	1.0	8.3

== National team career ==
Gozum was part of the Philippines men's national under-17 basketball team that competed in the 2015 FIBA Asia Under-16 Championship.
