= NCAA Season 94 basketball tournaments =

Basketball season

NCAA Season 94
- Host school: University of Perpetual Help System DALTA
Men's Finals	G1	G2	Wins
San Beda Red Lions	73	71	2
Lyceum Pirates	60	56	0
- Duration: November 6–12, 2018
- Arena(s): Mall of Asia Arena
- Finals MVP: Javee Mocon
- Winning coach: Boyet Fernandez (4th title)
- Semifinalists: Letran Knights; Perpetual Altas
- TV network(s): ABS-CBN Sports and Action (Channel 23 & ABS-CBN S+A HD Channel 166); Liga (Channel 86 & Liga HD Channel 186)
Juniors' Finals	G1	G2	G3	Wins
La Salle Green Hills Greenies	74	76	74	1
Mapúa Red Robins	69	85	77	2
- Duration: November 6–15, 2018
- Arena(s): Mall of Asia Arena
- Finals MVP: Paolo Hernandez
- Winning coach: Randy Alcantara (2nd title)
- Semifinalists: San Beda Red Cubs; JRU Light Bombers

The NCAA Season 94 basketball tournaments are the 94th basketball season of the National Collegiate Athletic Association (Philippines) (NCAA). The University of Perpetual Help System DALTA are the season hosts. Separate men's and juniors' tournaments are held for male college and high school students, respectively.

== Format ==
- In the seniors and juniors' tournament, ten (10) teams will play in a double round-robin classification.
- Once teams are tied, tie-breaker games shall be held for the top four seeds, if necessary.
- The scenarios after the elimination round ends are the following below:
  1. If no team sweeps the elimination round, the regular playoffs (Final Four) shall be used.
  2. If a team successfully sweep the elimination round, that team will gain an automatic bye to the finals and the stepladder playoffs shall be used.
- In the semifinals, the first and second seed shall earn a twice-to-beat bonus against their respective opponents. These teams shall only need to win once to advance to the finals; while the third and fourth seed teams will need to win twice to advance to the finals.
  - In the stepladder semifinals, the third and fourth seed will play to determine which among them will face the second seed, The winner of the game against the second seed will meet the first seed in the finals.
- The finals is a best-of-three championship series.

Tie-breaker classification rules
1. Head-to-head matchup in the two (2) rounds
2. Goal average between the tied teams
3. Overall goal average

Bai Cristobal was reappointed basketball commissioner for the second consecutive season.

== Teams ==
Men's teams
Team	College	Coach
Arellano Chiefs	Arellano University (AU)	(Philippines) Junjie Ablan
Letran Knights	Colegio de San Juan de Letran (CSJL)	(Philippines) Jeff Napa
Benilde Blazers	De La Salle–College of Saint Benilde (CSB)	(Philippines) Ty Tang
EAC Generals	Emilio Aguinaldo College (EAC)	(Philippines) Ariel Sison
JRU Heavy Bombers	José Rizal University (JRU)	(Philippines) Vergel Meneses
Lyceum Pirates	Lyceum of the Philippines University (LPU)	(Philippines) Topex Robinson
Mapúa Cardinals	Mapúa University (MU)	(Philippines) Atoy Co
San Beda Red Lions	San Beda University (SBU)	(Philippines) Boyet Fernandez
San Sebastian Stags	San Sebastian College – Recoletos (SSC-R)	(Philippines) Edgar Macaraya
Perpetual Altas	University of Perpetual Help System DALTA (UPHSD)	(Philippines) Frankie Lim

Juniors' teams
Team	High school	Coach
Arellano Braves	Arellano University (AU)	(Philippines) Tylon Darjuan
Letran Squires	Colegio de San Juan de Letran (CSJL)	(Philippines) Raymund Valenzona
EAC-IAC Brigadiers	Immaculate Concepcion Academy (IAC)	(Philippines) Marvin Bienvenida
JRU Light Bombers	José Rizal University (JRU)	(Philippines) Azlie Guro
La Salle Green Hills Greenies	La Salle Green Hills (LSGH)	(Philippines) Vic Lazaro
Lyceum Junior Pirates	Lyceum of the Philippines University – Cavite (LPU-C)	(Philippines) LA Mumar
Mapúa Red Robins	Malayan High School of Science (MHSS)	(Philippines) Randy Alcantara
San Beda Red Cubs	San Beda University Rizal (SBUR)	(Philippines) JB Sison
San Sebastian Staglets	San Sebastian College – Recoletos (SSC-R)	(Philippines) Mel Banua
Perpetual Junior Altas	University of Perpetual Help System DALTA (UPHSD)	(Philippines) Myk Saguiguit

=== Name changes ===
- San Beda College was granted university status by the Commission on Higher Education on February 6, 2018; thereafter renamed to as "San Beda University".

=== Coaching changes ===
Team	Outgoing coach	Manner of departure	Date	Replaced by	Date
Perpetual Altas	(Nigeria) Nosa Omorogbe	On indefinite leave	September 2017	(Philippines) Frankie Lim	January 17, 2018
Arellano Chiefs	(Philippines) Jerry Codiñera	Resignation	September 20, 2018	(Philippines) Junjie Ablan	September 20, 2018

== Venues ==
Venues in Metro Manila. Red pog, Primary venues; blue pogs: NCAA on Tour venues.

Like most Metro Manila-centric leagues, most games are held in arenas rented by the league, with games serving as neutral venues. In an innovation dubbed as "NCAA on Tour", starting in the previous season, the NCAA will continue holding Thursday games hosted at the campus of one of the teams that are playing on that day.

=== Main venues ===
Arena	City
Mall of Asia Arena	Pasay
Filoil Flying V Centre	San Juan

=== NCAA on Tour venues ===
Arena	Host team	City
Jose Rizal University Gym	JRU Heavy Bombers	Mandaluyong
Arellano University Gym	Arellano Chiefs	Manila
Emilio Aguinaldo College Gym	EAC Generals	Manila
Colegio de San Juan de Letran Gym	Letran Knights	Manila
University of Perpetual Help System DALTA Gym	Perpetual Altas	Las Piñas

== Squads ==
Each NCAA team can have up to 15 players on their roster. At least two is allowed to be a foreigner, but only one is allowed to be on court. A team is allowed to have three additional players in the reserve list. The opening day rosters were released on July 1.

=== Imports ===
The following are the imports, or non-Filipinos included in the opening day rosters:

Team	Import	Country
Arellano Chiefs	Elie Ongolo Ongolo	Cameroon
Benilde Blazers	Clement Leutcheu	Cameroon
EAC Generals	Hamadou Laminou	Cameroon
Lyceum Pirates	Mike Harry Nzeusseu	Cameroon
San Beda Red Lions	Donald Tankoua	Cameroon
San Beda Red Lions	Eugene Toba	Nigeria
Perpetual Altas	Prince Eze	Nigeria

Letran, JRU, Mapua and San Sebastian chose not to have imports for this season. Only two teams have won championships with no imports in its roster since 2006 (Letran 2015 and San Sebastian 2009). San Beda 2011 had an import in the lineup but did not play the entire season.

== Men's tournament ==
=== Elimination round ===
==== Team standings ====
Pos	Team	W	L	PCT	GB	Qualification
1	San Beda Red Lions	17	1	.944	—	Twice-to-beat in the semifinals
2	Lyceum Pirates	15	3	.833	2	Twice-to-beat in the semifinals
3	Letran Knights	13	5	.722	4	Twice-to-win in the semifinals
4	Perpetual Altas (H)	11	7	.611	6	Twice-to-win in the semifinals
5	Benilde Blazers	10	8	.556	7	
6	San Sebastian Stags (Note: San Sebastian forfeited two wins due to an ineligible player, RK Ilagan, participating in those games. Ilagan was found to have found playing in a ligang labas game after the rosters were approved.)	6	12	.333 (Note: Head-to-head point differential: San Sebastian +46, Mapua −46)	11	
7	Mapúa Cardinals	6	12	.333	11	
8	Arellano Chiefs	5	13	.278	12	
9	EAC Generals	4	14	.222	13	
10	JRU Heavy Bombers	3	15	.167	14	

Source: ABS-CBN Sports
Rules for classification: 1) winning percentage; 2) if tied in top 4, one-game playoff; 3) head-to-head point differential; 4) overall point differential
(H) Hosts

==== Scores ====
Results on top and to the right of the dashes are for first-round games; those to the bottom and to the left of it are second-round games.

Teams	AU	CSJL	CSB	EAC	JRU	LPU	MU	SBU	SSC-R	UPHSD
Arellano Chiefs	—	70–88	62–70	75–69*	79–70	65–82	83–91	79–98	82–81*	76–72
Letran Knights	99–82	—	64–60	76–56	74–58	82–87	84–63	76–80*	83–76	75–78
Benilde Blazers	89–73	94–81	—	84–71	81–66	65–77	90–79	69–75	20–0 (Note: San Sebastian originally won 85–78. The NCAA forfeited the game in favor of Benilde after San Sebastian player RK Ilagan was ruled ineligible to play for playing in a ligang labas game.)	84–77
EAC Generals	78–70	82–91	69–67	—	55–57	97–106	89–85	46–61	79–77*	74–76
JRU Heavy Bombers	70–86	79–89	68–84	81–78	—	56–88	60–72	40–77	20–0 (Note: San Sebastian originally won 86–76. The NCAA forfeited the game in favor of JRU after San Sebastian player RK Ilagan was ruled ineligible to play for playing in a ligang labas game.)	72–78
Lyceum Pirates	113–79	79–80	77–64	95–75	82–74	—	94–81	73–66	85–80	91–77
Mapúa Cardinals	91–78	69–84	86–83	80–67	81–79	76–92	—	70–88	70–94	68–74
San Beda Red Lions	90–52	74–68	77–55	76–57	73–45	75–68	80–55	—	65–54	67–65
San Sebastian Stags	91–63	61–76	66–65	78–67	82–75	70–88	86–64	82–75	—	76–78
Perpetual Altas	57–45	80–82	87–91	81–67	85–73	83–81	88–71	72–80	85–77*	—

Source: Manila Bulletin
Legend: Blue = left column team win; Red = top row team win.
Matches with lighter background shading were decided after overtime.

==== Match-up results ====
	Round 1									Round 2								
Team ╲ Game	1	2	3	4	5	6	7	8	9	10	11	12	13	14	15	16	17	18
Arellano	EAC school colors	Lyceum school colors	SSC-R school colors	Mapua school colors	Letran school colors	JRU school colors	CSB school colors	San Beda school colors	UPHD school colors	Letran school colors	UPHD school colors	CSB school colors	Lyceum school colors	EAC school colors	JRU school colors	San Beda school colors	Mapua school colors	SSC-R school colors
Letran	UPHD school colors	SSC-R school colors	JRU school colors	CSB school colors	Arellano school colors	San Beda school colors	Lyceum school colors	Mapua school colors	EAC school colors	Arellano school colors	San Beda school colors	Mapua school colors	EAC school colors	JRU school colors	Lyceum school colors	SSC-R school colors	UPHD school colors	CSB school colors
Benilde	SSC-R school colors	Mapua school colors	San Beda school colors	JRU school colors	Letran school colors	Lyceum school colors	EAC school colors	Arellano school colors	UPHD school colors	UPHD school colors	SSC-R school colors	Mapua school colors	Arellano school colors	EAC school colors	San Beda school colors	Lyceum school colors	JRU school colors	Letran school colors
EAC	Lyceum school colors	Arellano school colors	San Beda school colors	UPHD school colors	SSC-R school colors	Mapua school colors	CSB school colors	JRU school colors	Letran school colors	SSC-R school colors	Lyceum school colors	San Beda school colors	Letran school colors	CSB school colors	Arellano school colors	Mapua school colors	UPHD school colors	JRU school colors
JRU	Mapua school colors	Lyceum school colors	Letran school colors	SSC-R school colors	CSB school colors	Arellano school colors	UPHD school colors	EAC school colors	San Beda school colors	San Beda school colors	Lyceum school colors	Mapua school colors	SSC-R school colors	UPHD school colors	Letran school colors	Arellano school colors	EAC school colors	CSB school colors
Lyceum	SSC-R school colors	EAC school colors	JRU school colors	Arellano school colors	Mapua school colors	UPHD school colors	CSB school colors	Letran school colors	San Beda school colors	SSC-R school colors	JRU school colors	EAC school colors	UPHD school colors	Arellano school colors	Mapua school colors	Letran school colors	CSB school colors	San Beda school colors
Mapúa	JRU school colors	CSB school colors	Lyceum school colors	Arellano school colors	San Beda school colors	EAC school colors	SSC-R school colors	UPHD school colors	Letran school colors	San Beda school colors	JRU school colors	CSB school colors	Letran school colors	UPHD school colors	Lyceum school colors	EAC school colors	SSC-R school colors	Arellano school colors
San Beda	UPHD school colors	CSB school colors	EAC school colors	Mapua school colors	Letran school colors	SSC-R school colors	Lyceum school colors	Arellano school colors	JRU school colors	JRU school colors	Mapua school colors	Letran school colors	EAC school colors	SSC-R school colors	CSB school colors	Arellano school colors	Lyceum school colors	UPHD school colors
San Sebastian	Lyceum school colors	CSB school colors	Letran school colors	JRU school colors	Arellano school colors	EAC school colors	Mapua school colors	UPHD school colors	San Beda school colors	Lyceum school colors	EAC school colors	CSB school colors	JRU school colors	San Beda school colors	UPHD school colors	Letran school colors	Mapua school colors	Arellano school colors
Perpetual	San Beda school colors	Letran school colors	EAC school colors	Lyceum school colors	SSC-R school colors	Mapua school colors	JRU school colors	CSB school colors	Arellano school colors	CSB school colors	Arellano school colors	Lyceum school colors	JRU school colors	Mapua school colors	SSC-R school colors	EAC school colors	Letran school colors	San Beda school colors

= Win; = OT win; = Win by forfeit; = Loss; = OT loss; = Loss by forfeit

=== Bracket ===
Semifinals (Top 2 twice-to-beat)
1	San Beda	83
4	Perpetual	72
2	Lyceum	109
3	Letran	85

Finals (Best-of-three playoff)
1	San Beda	73	71
2	Lyceum	60	56

=== Semifinals ===
San Beda and Lyceum have the twice-to-beat advantage; they only need to win once, while their opponents twice, to advance to the finals. San Beda is in its 13th consecutive playoffs appearance (skipping the semifinals in 2010 after winning all elimination round games), Lyceum is in its first semifinals appearance (having advanced to the Finals outright last year). Letran is returning to the semifinals after a 2-year absence, while Perpetual returns after its last appearance in 2016.

==== (1) San Beda vs. (4) Perpetual ====
San Beda has the twice-to-beat advantage. San Beda has won all but one of its semifinals match-ups with Perpetual since the Final Four era, with Perpetual winning in 2004, but losing in 2012, 2013, 2014 and 2016.

Prior to the game, Perpetual's wins, and its playoffs appearance, were in danger of being forfeited as several of its players played in a ligang labas game while serving residency. The league sternly reprimanded the team as it found out that the players represented a school-based team, which is allowed by the league rules.

October 26
4:00 p.m.

San Beda Red Lions	83–72	Perpetual Altas
Scoring by quarter: 13–11, 14–13, 26–24, 30–24
Pts: Robert Bolick 23; Rebs: Donald Tankoua 18; Asts: Robert Bolick 6		Pts: Razon, Peralta, 16 each Rebs: Prince Eze 13; Asts: Edgar Charcos 9
San Beda wins series in one game

Filoil Flying V Centre, San Juan

San Beda pulled away late in the third quarter with four three-pointers by AC Soberano transformed a 1-point Altas lead to an 11-point lead for the Red Lions early in the fourth quarter. The Red Lions qualified to their 13th consecutive NCAA Finals.

==== (2) Lyceum vs. (3) Letran ====
Lyceum has the twice-to-beat advantage. This is the first match-up between Lyceum and Letran in the playoffs.

October 26
1:30 p.m.

Lyceum Pirates	109–85	Letran Knights
Scoring by quarter: 29–16, 22–29, 30–19, 28–21
Pts: Mike Harry Nzeusseu 23; Rebs: Mike Harry Nzeusseu 17; Asts: CJ Perez 3		Pts: Larry Muyang 21; Rebs: Larry Muyang 12; Asts: Bong Quinto 7
Lyceum wins series in one game

Filoil Flying V Centre, San Juan

Lyceum pulled away in the middle of the third quarter after Letran's JP Calvo injured his right ankle after contesting a loose ball with Mike Nzeusseu. Lyceum had a 15–0 run after Calvo's injury and led by as much 37 points.

=== Finals ===
This will be the second consecutive meeting between San Beda and Lyceum in the Finals. The Red Lions defeated the Pirates in 2017, winning all 2 games in the championship series.

November 6
4:00 p.m.

Statistics

San Beda Red Lions	73–60	Lyceum Pirates
Scoring by quarter: 19–9, 24–13, 16–17, 14–21
Pts: Javee Mocon 14; Rebs: Donald Tankoua 16; Asts: Robert Bolick 9		Pts: Mike Harry Nzeusseu 16; Rebs: Mike Harry Nzeusseu 14; Asts: Mj Ayaay 4

Mall of Asia Arena, Pasay

November 12
4:00 p.m.

Statistics

San Beda Red Lions	71–56	Lyceum Pirates
Scoring by quarter: 23–15, 16–18, 10–11, 22–12
Pts: Javee Mocon 16; Rebs: Donald Tankoua 16; Asts: Robert Bolick 12		Pts: CJ Perez 19; Rebs: Mike Harry Nzeusseu 13; Asts: Perez, Jc. Marcelino, 4 each
San Beda wins series 2–0

Mall of Asia Arena, Pasay
Attendance: 13,111

- Finals Most Valuable Player: Javee Mocon (San Beda Red Lions)

Prior to Game 1, Lyceum's CJ Perez, last year's Most Valuable Player, was suspended for a game after he applied to the 2018 PBA draft without notifying the Management Committee. Perez is the first person to be suspended after San Beda's Yousif Aljamal in 2007, although the league rescinded the suspension after San Beda sued in court, and threatened to leave the NCAA.

San Beda won Game 1 handily by 13 points. The Red Lions led by 31–11 in the first half and Lyceum only got to reduce the deficit by 10 points late in the fourth quarter.

After the game, Lyceum coach Topex Robinson criticized the league on Perez's suspension. Benilde coaches Ty Tang and Charles Tiu also criticized the league on social media. The Management Committee decided to defer any punishment to the coaches until the Finals are over.

San Beda defeated a full-strength Lyceum squad in Game 2. San Beda went on a 22–12 scoring run on top of a five-point lead before the fourth period to seal their 11th title in 13 seasons, and 22nd overall.

San Beda qualifies to the 2018 PCCL National Collegiate Championship Final Four. Lyceum may participate in the NCR qualifiers as of one of the two NCAA teams.

=== All-Star Game ===
The 2018 NCAA All-Star Game is on August 31 at the Filoil Flying V Centre. The actual game was preceded by the side events patterned from the NBA All-Star Weekend.

August 31

Team Heroes	89–94	Team Saints

Filoil Flying V Centre, San Juan

- All-Star Game MVP: Michael Calisaan (Team Saints)

Rosters
Team Heroes	Team Saints
Ian Alban	Josh Barnes
Michael Canete	JJ Domingo
Leo dela Cruz	Luigi Velasco
Juju Bautista	JP Calvo
Jeric Diego	Christian Fajarito
Jerome Garcia	Bong Quinto
Aaron Bordon	Edgar Charcos
RJ David	AJ Coronel
Jed Mendoza	Prince Eze
JC Marcelino	Robert Bolick
JV Marcelino	JV Mocon
Toci Tangsingco	Radge Tongco
Warren Bonifacio	Allyn Bulanadi
Cedric Pelayo	Michael Calisaan
Laurenz Victoria	Alvin Capobres

==== Skills Challenge ====
Participant	Team
Clint Doliguez	San Beda
Arjan dela Cruz	San Sebastian
Bonbon Batiller	Letran
Maui Sera Josef	Arellano
Eric Jabel	Mapúa
Jasper Cuevas	Perpetual
Jimboy Pasturan	Benilde
CJ Cadua	EAC
Mark Mallari	JRU
Carl Lumbao	Lyceum

==== Three-point Shootout ====
Participant	Team
AC Soberano	San Beda
Allyn Bulanadi	San Sebastian
Jerome Garcia	EAC
Toci Tansingco	Lyceum
Exe Biteng	Mapúa
Rence Alcoriza	Arellano
MJ Dela Virgen	JRU
Koy Galvelo	Letran
Carlo Young	Benilde
Luke Sese	Perpetual

==== Slam Dunk Contest ====
Participant	Team
Eugene Toba	San Beda
Justin Gutang	Benilde
Juju Bautista	EAC
Enoch Valdez	Lyceum
Ken Villapando	San Sebastian
Arvin Gamboa	Mapúa
Renato Ular	Letran
William de Leon	Arellano
Lean Martel	Perpetual

==== Shooting Stars ====
Team	Alumnus player	Men's player	Juniors' player
Arellano	Jio Jalalon	Kraniel Villoria	Marlon Espiritu
Letran	Rey Nambatac	Christian Fajarito*	Stacey Tibayan
Benilde	RJ Deles	Carlo Young**	Sebastian Locsin***
EAC	Bong Melacoton	Sean Neri****	CJ Boado
JRU	Philip Paniamogan*****	Agem Miranda	John Amores
Lyceum	Kevin Lacap	Carl Lumbao******	John Barba
Mapúa	Yong Garcia	Exi Biteng	Clint Escamis
Perpetual	Gerald Dizon	Jielo Razon	Yukihiro Kawamura
San Beda	Rome dela Rosa********	Calvin Oftana	Penny Estacio
San Sebastian	Jepoy Quiamco	Michael Are	Milo Janao

*Replaced Jerrick Balanza *****Replaced John Wilson

**Replaced Jimboy Pasturan ******Replaced Kim Cinco

***Replaced Francis Lopez *******Replaced Jake Pascual

****Replaced Maui Cruz ********Replaced Ian Valdez

=== Awards ===
NCAA Season 94 men's basketball champions
San Beda Red Lions
22nd title, third consecutive title

The end-of-season awards were handed out before Game 2 of the men's finals, at the Mall of Asia Arena.

- Most Valuable Player: Prince Eze (Perpetual Altas)
- Rookie of the Year: Larry Muyang (Letran Knights)
- Mythical Five:
  - Prince Eze (Perpetual Altas)
  - Bong Quinto (Letran Knights)
  - Robert Bolick (San Beda Red Lions)
  - Javee Mocon (San Beda Red Lions)
  - Donald Tankoua (San Beda Red Lions)
- Defensive Player of the Year: Prince Eze (Perpetual Altas)
- All-Defensive Team:
  - Prince Eze (Perpetual Altas)
  - Donald Tankoua (San Beda Red Lions)
  - Hamadou Laminou (EAC Generals)
  - Michael Calisaan (San Sebastian Stags)
  - Mike Nzeusseu (Lyceum Pirates)
- Most Improved Player: Archie Concepcion (Arellano Chiefs)

==== Players of the Week ====
The NCAA Press Corps awards a player of the week sponsored by Chooks-to-Go.

Week ending	Player	Team
July 13	(Philippines) Jaycee Marcelino	Lyceum Pirates
July 20	(Philippines) JP Calvo	Letran Knights
July 27	(Philippines) CJ Perez	Lyceum Pirates
August 3	(Philippines) JP Maguliano	EAC Generals
August 10	(Nigeria) Prince Eze	Perpetual Altas
August 17	(Philippines) MJ Ayaay	Lyceum Pirates
August 24	(Philippines) Robert Bolick (Philippines) Bong Quinto	San Beda Red Lions; Letran Knights
September 1	(Philippines) Maui Sera Josef	Arellano Chiefs
September 8	(Philippines) Jerrick Balanza	Letran Knights
September 15	(Cameroon) Donald Tankoua	San Beda Red Lions
September 22	(Nigeria) Prince Eze	Perpetual Altas
September 29	(Philippines) Koy Gavelo	Letran Knights
October 6	(Philippines) Larry Muyang	Letran Knights
October 13	(Philippines) Javee Mocon	San Beda Red Lions
October 20	(Philippines) James Canlas	San Beda Red Lions
October 23	(Philippines) Michael Calisaan	San Sebastian Stags

=== Statistics ===
==== Game player highs ====
Statistic	Player	Team	Total	Opponent	Date
Points	(Philippines) Robert Bolick	San Beda Red Lions	50	Arellano Chiefs	August 24, 2018
Rebounds	(Nigeria) Prince Eze	Perpetual Altas	25	Arellano Chiefs	August 28, 2018
Assists	(Philippines) Bong Quinto	Letran Knights	12	Arellano Chiefs; JRU Heavy Bombers	September 6, 2018; September 28, 2018
Steals	(Philippines) CJ Perez	Lyceum Pirates	6	EAC Generals	July 13, 2018
Blocks	(Nigeria) Prince Eze	Perpetual Altas	9	Arellano Chiefs	July 28, 2018

==== Season player highs ====
Statistic	Player	Team	Average
Points	(Philippines) Robert Bolick	San Beda Red Lions	18.7
Rebounds	(Nigeria) Prince Eze	Perpetual Altas	16.5
Assists	(Philippines) Bong Quinto	Letran Knights	6.5
Steals	(Philippines) CJ Perez	Lyceum Pirates	3.3
Blocks	(Nigeria) Prince Eze	Perpetual Altas	3.3

==== Game team highs ====
Statistic	Team	Total	Opponent	Date
Points	Lyceum Pirates	113	Arellano Chiefs	September 27, 2018
Rebounds	Letran Knights	67	Mapúa Cardinals	August 21, 2018
Assists	Letran Knights; Lyceum Pirates	27	JRU Heavy Bombers; Arellano Chiefs	September 28, 2018; September 27, 2018
Steals	Lyceum Pirates	17	EAC Generals	August 7, 2018
Blocks	EAC Generals	14	Arellano Chiefs	July 13, 2018

==== Season team highs ====
Statistic	Team	Average
Points	Lyceum Pirates	86.6
Rebounds	EAC Generals	32.8
Assists	Letran Knights	20.2
Steals	Lyceum Pirates	10.2
Blocks	Perpetual Altas	5.2

== Juniors' tournament ==
=== Elimination round ===
==== Team standings ====
Pos	Team	W	L	PCT	GB	Qualification
1	La Salle Green Hills Greenies	16	2	.889	—	Twice-to-beat in the semifinals
2	Mapúa Red Robins	14	4	.778	2	Twice-to-beat in the semifinals
3	San Beda Red Cubs	12	6	.667	4	Twice-to-win in the semifinals
4	JRU Light Bombers	11	7	.611	5	Twice-to-win in the semifinals
5	Lyceum Junior Pirates	9	9	.500 (Note: Head-to-head point differential: Lyceum 0, Perpetual 0; overall record point differential: Lyceum −8, Perpetual −14)	7	
6	Perpetual Junior Altas (H)	9	9	.500	7	
7	Arellano Braves	7	11	.389	9	
8	San Sebastian Staglets	5	13	.278	11	
9	Letran Squires	4	14	.222	12	
10	EAC–ICA Brigadiers	3	15	.167	13	

Rules for classification: 1) winning percentage; 2) if tied for #2 or #4, one-game playoff; 3) head-to-head point differential; 4) overall point differential
(H) Hosts

==== Scores ====
Results on top and to the right of the dashes are for first-round games; those to the bottom and to the left of it are second-round games.

Teams	AU	CSJL	EAC	JRU	LSGH	LPU	MHSS	SBUR	SSCR	UPHSD
Arellano Braves	—	78–72	79–77	64–79	66–74	98–78	96–107*	68–95	98–93	71–88
Letran Squires	80–74	—	65–63	59–71	66–82	66–69	63–83	74–75*	62–59	57–73
EAC Brigadiers	73–85	84–76*	—	69–74	71–103	63–74	79–80	81–86	71–78	83–78
JRU Light Bombers	75–73	74–71	85–65	—	87–94**	87–88	80–70	63–65	78–92	84–72
La Salle Green Hills Greenies	91–77	65–62	77–61	86–71	—	80–71	81–95	73–62	93–80	89–83
Lyceum Junior Pirates	105–85	81–71	72–66	82–68	75–80	—	76–93	59–63	68–69	78–82
Malayan Red Robins	86–78	69–66	74–73	73–74	93–87	78–89	—	93–98*	85–74	89–65
San Beda Red Cubs	83–71	61–60*	80–71	62–56	78–81	83–76	58–91	—	51–52	69–72
San Sebastian Staglets	73–75	78–87	69–71	56–51	65–76	93–99*	62–69	50–63	—	64–70*
Perpetual Junior Altas	66–70	74–69	95–80	62–69	82–96	74–78	73–96	71–67	82–67	—

Legend: Blue = left column team win; Red = top row team win.
Matches with lighter background shading were decided after overtime.

=== Bracket ===
Semifinals (Top 2 twice-to-beat)
1	LSGH	78	97
4	JRU	81	71
2	Malayan	71	75
3	San Beda–Rizal	84	67

Finals (Best-of-three playoff)
1	LSGH	74	76	74
2	Malayan	69	85	77

=== Semifinals ===
LSGH and Malayan have the twice-to-beat advantage; they only need to win once, while their opponents twice, to advance to the finals. LSGH is on its second consecutive semifinals appearance, Malayan is in its fourth and San Beda is in its eighth consecutive semifinals appearance. JRU returns to the semifinals after a 1-year absence.

==== (1) LSGH vs. (4) JRU ====
This is the first playoffs match-up between LSGH and JRU since the 2008 first round of the stepladder semifinals in which JRU won in overtime.

October 26
10:00 a.m.

La Salle Green Hills Greenies	78–81	JRU Light Bombers
Scoring by quarter: 23–26, 15–11, 23–18, 17–26
Pts: JD Cagulangan 39; Rebs: 3 players, 8 each Asts: Joshua David 5		Pts: Thomas Vasquez 17; Rebs: Marwin Dionisio 17; Asts: 4 players, 3 each

Filoil Flying V Centre, San Juan

October 29
8:00 a.m.

La Salle Green Hills Greenies	97–71	JRU Light Bombers
Scoring by quarter: 27–21, 24–17, 24–15, 22–18
Pts: Inand Fornillos 22; Rebs: Inand Fornillos 11; Asts: Joel Cagulangan 12		Pts: Marwin Dionisio 22; Rebs: John Amores 10; Asts: John Delos Santos 10
La Salle wins series in two games

Filoil Flying V Centre, San Juan

==== (2) Malayan vs. (3) San Beda ====
This is the first playoffs match-up between Malayan and San Beda since the 2016 Finals in which Malayan won its first championship under the Malayan name, in three games.

October 26
8:00 a.m.

Mapúa Red Robins	71–84	San Beda Red Cubs
Scoring by quarter: 15–26, 19–18, 16–27, 21–13
Pts: Dan Arches 19; Rebs: Jonnel Policarpio 12; Asts: Dan Arches 7		Pts: Jade Talampas 26; Rebs: Sanchez, Lazaro, 13 each Asts: Estacio, Oliva, 5 each

Filoil Flying V Centre, San Juan

October 29
10:00 a.m.

Mapúa Red Robins	75–67	San Beda Red Cubs
Scoring by quarter: 14–15, 23–17, 17–15, 21–20
Pts: Paolo Hernandez 27; Rebs: Jonnel Policarpio 13; Asts: Karl Mariano 6		Pts: Art Oliva 16; Rebs: Joshua Lazaro 12; Asts: Penny Estacio 5
Malayan wins series in two games

Filoil Flying V Centre, San Juan

=== Finals ===
This is the second consecutive meeting between LSGH and Malayan in the Finals. In 2017, LSGH won its first-ever NCAA championship after defeating the erstwhile defending champions Malayan.

November 6
2:00 p.m.

Statistics

La Salle Green Hills Greenies	74–69	Mapúa Red Robins
Scoring by quarter: 17–18, 25–14, 11–10, 21–27
Pts: JD Cagulangan 16; Rebs: Mark Sangco 15; Asts: JD Cagulangan 4		Pts: Paolo Hernandez 20; Rebs: Paolo Hernandez 9 Asts: Karl Mariano 4

Mall of Asia Arena, Pasay

November 12
1:00 p.m.

Statistics

La Salle Green Hills Greenies	76–85	Mapúa Red Robins
Scoring by quarter: 25–20, 14–22, 17–17, 20–26
Pts: JD Cagulangan 17; Rebs: Fornillos, Lepalam, 12 each Asts: Cagulangan, Sangco 4 each		Pts: Dan Arches 22; Rebs: Jonnel Policarpio 14; Asts: Paolo Hernandez 4

Mall of Asia Arena, Pasay

November 15
2:00 p.m.

Statistics

La Salle Green Hills Greenies	74–77	Mapúa Red Robins
Scoring by quarter: 15–18, 19–24, 22–29, 18–6
Pts: Inand Fornillos 18; Rebs: Mark Sangco 16; Asts: Joshua David 5		Pts: Paolo Hernandez 33; Rebs: Paolo Hernandez 12; Asts: Karl Mariano 6
Malayan wins series 2–1

Mall of Asia Arena, Pasay

- Finals Most Valuable Player: Paolo Hernandez (Mapúa Red Robins)

=== Awards ===
NCAA Season 94 juniors' basketball champions
Mapúa Red Robins
Second title

The end-of-season awards were handed out after Game 2 of the juniors' finals at the Mall of Asia Arena.

- Most Valuable Player: Joel Cagulangan (La Salle Green Hills Greenies)
- Rookie of the Year: Jonnel Policarpio (Mapúa Red Robins)
- Mythical Five:
  - Joel Cagulangan (La Salle Green Hills Greenies)
  - Inand Fornilos (La Salle Green Hills Greenies)
  - Joshua David (La Salle Green Hills Greenies)
  - Clint Escamis (Mapúa Red Robins)
  - Aaron Fermin (Arellano Braves)
- Defensive Player of the Year: Aaron Fermin (Arellano Braves)
- All-Defensive Team:
  - Aaron Fermin (Arellano Braves)
  - Inand Fornilos (La Salle Green Hills Greenies)
  - Joshua Lazaro (San Beda Red Cubs)
  - Jonnel Policarpio (Mapúa Red Robins)
  - Paolo Hernandez (Mapúa Red Robins)
- Most Improved Player: John Anthony Amores (JRU Light Bombers)

== See also ==
- UAAP Season 81 basketball tournaments

Preceded by Season 93 (2017)	NCAA basketball seasons Season 94 (2018)	Succeeded by Season 95 (2019)
