= Edgar Macaraya =

Filipino basketball player and coach

UP Fighting Maroons
- Title: Assistant coach
- League: UAAP

Personal information
- Born: October 10, 1962 (age 64)
- Listed height: 6 ft 0 in (1.83 m)
- Listed weight: 170 lb (77 kg)

Career information
- College: San Sebastian
- PBA draft: 1990: 3rd round, 18th overall pick
- Drafted by: Pop Cola Sizzlers
- Playing career: 1990–1993
- Position: Shooting guard/Small forward
- Coaching career: 2011–present

Career history

Playing
- 1990–1992: Pop Cola/Sarsi
- 1993: Sta. Lucia Realtors

Coaching
- 2003–2009: San Sebastian-Cavite
- 2011–2016: CEU
- 2016–2022: San Sebastian
- 2024: Quezon City Toda Aksyon
- 2024–present: UP (assistant)
- 2026–present: Mindoro Tamaraws

Career highlights
- As player: NCAA champion (1985); As head coach: 5× NAASCU champion (2008–2009, 2013–2015); As assistant coach: UAAP men's champion (2024)

Edgar "Egay" Macaraya is a retired Filipino professional basketball player who is the head coach of the Mindoro Tamaraws of the Maharlika Pilipinas Basketball League (MPBL). He is also an assistant coach for the UP Fighting Maroons. He won five titles in the NAASCU with San Sebastian-Cavite and with the CEU Scorpions before coaching for his alma mater with the San Sebastian Stags.

== Playing career ==
Macaraya played for the San Sebastian Stags in college and won a championship with them in 1985. He gained a reputation as a shooter who also defended his opponent well. He also played in the amateur PABL, where in one game, he made 14 three-point shots, the most for any Philippine amateur league.

In his short tenure in Philippine Basketball Association, he played for the Pop Cola/Sarsi Sizzlers and Sta. Lucia Realtors.

== Coaching career ==
=== NAASCU ===
Macaraya first coached in the NAASCU with the San Sebastian-Cavite Baycats. He led them to two straight titles from 2008 to 2009.

Macaraya then coached the CEU Scorpions. From 2013 to 2015, he led CEU to three straight NAASCU titles. His titles with CEU gave him five total NAASCU titles, tied with Ato Tolentino for most in league history until they were surpassed by Jino Manansala. In 2013, he also led CEU to the Sweet 16 of the 2013 PCCL Championship.

=== NCAA ===
In 2016, Macaraya was hired to be the head coach of his alma mater San Sebastian, taking over from Rodney Santos. He led San Sebastian to the NCAA Final Four twice, but in his last two seasons, failed to make the Final Four. He was replaced in 2022 by John Kallos.

=== UAAP ===
In 2024, Macaraya became an assistant coach of the UP Fighting Maroons in the UAAP. In Season 87, UP won the championship.

== Coaching record ==
=== Collegiate ===
Season	Team	GP	W	L	PCT	Finish	PG	PW	PL	PPCT	Results
2016	SSC-R	18	8	10	.444	7th	—	—	—	—	Eliminated
2017	SSC-R	18	9	9	.500	4th	3	2	1	.667	Stepladder round 2
2018	SSC-R	18	6	12	.333	6th	—	—	—	—	Eliminated
2019	SSC-R	18	11	7	.611	4th	1	0	1	.000	Stepladder round 1
2020	SSC-R	Cancelled due to COVID-19 pandemic									
2021	SSC-R	9	3	6	.333	8th	—	—	—	—	Eliminated
2022	SSC-R	18	8	10	.444	5th	—	—	—	—	Eliminated
Totals		99	45	54	.454	—	4	2	2	.500	0 championship

Preceded by Rodney Santos	San Sebastian Golden Stags men's basketball head coach 2016-2022	Succeeded by John Kallos
Preceded by {{{before}}}	{{{title}}}	Succeeded by {{{after}}}
