= Triathlon Association of the Philippines =

National governing body for Triathlon in the Philippines

- Sport: Triathlon
- Abbreviation: TRAP
- Regional affiliation: Asian Triathlon Confederation (ASTC)
- President: Ramon Marchan
- Secretary: Tom Carrasco

Official website
- triathlon.org.ph
- (Philippines)

The Triathlon Association of the Philippines is the national governing body for Triathlon in the Philippines. It is accredited by the International Triathlon Union which is the governing body for the sport of Triathlon in the world. The association is also a member of the Asian Triathlon Confederation. The Asian Triathlon Confederation gave the Triathlon Association of the Philippines "developed status" in its 2014 and 2015 evaluation of its members in the areas of technical officials, coaches development and athletes development.

On February 27, 2018, TRAP was awarded as the National Sports Association of the Year in the Philippine Sportswriters Association Annual Awards, citing their gold medal finishes in Men's and Women's Triathlon events in the 2017 Southeast Asian Games in Kuala Lumpur, Malaysia.
