= 2017 Collegiate Basketball Awards =

- Date: January 26, 2017
- Location: Montgomery Place Social Hall, Quezon City
- Country: Philippines

The 2017 Collegiate Basketball Awards was an awarding ceremony organized by the UAAP-NCAA Press Corps, a group of sports journalists who are covering the men's basketball tournaments of the University Athletics Association of the Philippines (UAAP) and the National Collegiate Athletic Association (NCAA). UAAP Press Corps is currently headed by Reuben Terrado of Sports Interactive Network Philippines, while the NCAA Press Corps is headed by Cedelf P. Tupas of the Philippine Daily Inquirer.

The awarding will be held at the Montgomery Place Social Hall, E. Rodriguez Avenue, Quezon City on January 26, 2017. The awards ceremony was hosted by Ganiel Krishnan.

== Awardees ==
Award	Recipient	Reference
Coach of the Year	Aldin Ayo (De La Salle Green Archers)	
Coach of the Year	Jamike Jarin (San Beda Red Lions)	
Mighty Sports Collegiate Mythical Five	Jio Jalalon (Arellano Chiefs)	
Mighty Sports Collegiate Mythical Five	Ben Mbala (DLSU Green Archers)	
Mighty Sports Collegiate Mythical Five	Javee Mocon (San Beda Red Lions)	
Mighty Sports Collegiate Mythical Five	Allwell Oraeme (Mapua Cardinals)	
Mighty Sports Collegiate Mythical Five	Jeron Teng (DLSU Green Archers)	
Pivotal Player of the Year	Kib Montalbo (DLSU Green Archers)	
Pivotal Player of the Year	Davon Potts (San Beda Red Lions)	
Impact Player of the Year	Robert Bolick (San Beda Red Lions)	
Impact Player of the Year	Isaac Go (Ateneo Blue Eagles)	
Chooks to Go Breakout Player	Paul Desiderio (UP Fighting Maroons)	
Super Seniors	Jett Manuel (UP Fighting Maroons)	
Super Seniors	Raymar Jose (FEU Tamaraws)	
Mr. Efficiency	Papi Sarr (Adamson Soaring Falcons)	
Smart Player of the Year	Ben Mbala (DLSU Green Archers)	

== See also ==
- 2016 in Philippine sports
