= NCAA Season 93 =

- Host school: San Sebastian College-Recoletos
- Tagline: "Reignite: Bolder. Braver. Stronger."

General
- Seniors: San Beda University
- Juniors: San Beda University Rizal

Seniors' champions
Sport		Men	Women
Basketball		San Beda	N/A
Volleyball		Perpetual	Arellano
Chess		San Beda	
Taekwondo		San Beda	Benilde
Table Tennis		Benilde	San Beda
Lawn Tennis		Benilde	San Beda
Soft Tennis		San Beda	
Swimming		San Beda	San Beda
Beach Volleyball		EAC	San Beda
Track and Field		Arellano	
Football		Benilde	
Badminton		San Beda	Arellano
- Cheerdance: Arellano (Ex - Coed)

Juniors' champions
Sport		Boys	Girls
Basketball		LSGH	N/A
Volleyball		Perpetual	
Chess		Letran	
Taekwondo		Arellano	
Table Tennis		San Beda	
Lawn Tennis		San Beda	
Swimming		San Beda	
Beach Volleyball		Arellano	
Track and Field		San Beda	
Football		San Beda	
Badminton		San Beda	
- (NT) = No tournament; (DS) = Demonstration Sport; (Ex) = Exhibition;

NCAA Season 93 was the 2017–18 collegiate athletic year of the National Collegiate Athletic Association (NCAA) in the Philippines. It was hosted by San Sebastian College-Recoletos (SSC-R).

== Sports calendar ==
This is the tentative calendar of events of the NCAA Season 93. The list includes the tournament host schools and the venues.

=== First semester ===
Sport/Division	Event host	Opening date	Venue/s
Basketball (Seniors/Juniors)	San Sebastian	July 8, 2017	Filoil Flying V Centre, Mall of Asia Arena, UPHSD Gym, CSJL Gym, AU Gym, MU Gym, and SSC-R Gym
Chess (Seniors/Juniors)	Lyceum	August 6, 2017	JPL Hall of Freedom (Lyceum of the Philippines University)
Badminton (Seniors/Juniors)	JRU	September 4, 2017	Rizal Memorial Badminton Hall
Swimming (Seniors/Juniors)	San Beda	September 6, 2017	Rizal Memorial Swimming Complex
Table Tennis (Seniors/Juniors)	Benilde	September 9, 2017	Harrison Plaza Activity Center
Taekwondo (Seniors/Juniors)	Letran	October 6, 2017	Colegio de San Juan de Letran Gym

=== Second semester ===
Sport/Division	Event host	Opening date	Venue
Volleyball (Seniors/Juniors)	San Sebastian	January 4, 2018	Filoil Flying V Centre
Lawn Tennis (Men's/Juniors)		TBA	TBA
Soft Tennis (Women)		TBA	TBA
Football (Seniors/Juniors)		TBA	TBA
Beach Volleyball (Seniors/Juniors)		TBA	TBA
Track and Field (Seniors/Juniors)		TBA	TBA
Cheerleading		TBA	TBA

== Basketball ==
The NCAA Season 93 basketball tournaments of the NCAA Season 93 commenced on July 8, 2017 at the Mall of Asia Arena, Pasay.

=== Seniors' tournament ===
==== Elimination round ====
Pos	Team	W	L	PCT	GB	Qualification
1	LPU Pirates	18	0	1.000	—	Advance to the Finals (Note: As Lyceum won all of their elimination round games, the stepladder format will be used instead of the regular Final Four format.)
2	San Beda Red Lions	16	2	.889	2	Proceed to stepladder round 2
3	JRU Heavy Bombers	11	7	.611	7	Proceed to stepladder round 1
4	San Sebastian Stags (H)	9	9	.500 (Note: Head-to-head point differential: San Sebastian +30, Letran –9, Arellano –21; fourth-seed playoffs: Letran 70–68 Arellano, San Sebastian 74–69 Letran)	9	Proceed to stepladder round 1
5	Letran Knights	9	9	.500	9	
6	Arellano Chiefs	9	9	.500	9	
7	EAC Generals	7	11	.389	11	
8	Benilde Blazers	4	14	.222 (Note: Head-to-head record: Benilde 2–0 Perpetual)	14	
9	Perpetual Altas (Note: Perpetual's first round win over Benilde was forfeited after its entire team wore the dark-colored uniforms over the light-colored ones that were assigned to them for this game.)	4	14	.222	14	
10	Mapúa Cardinals	3	15	.167	15	

Source: ABS-CBN Sports
Rules for classification: 1) winning percentage; 2) if tied for #2 or #4, one-game playoff; 3) head-to-head point differential; 4) overall point differential
(H) Hosts

==== Bracket ====
Stepladder round 1 (Single-elimination)
3	JRU	73
4	San Sebastian	85

Stepladder round 2 (Single-elimination)
2	San Beda	76
4	San Sebastian	71

Finals (Best-of-three playoff)
1	Lyceum	87	82
2	San Beda	94	92

=== Juniors' tournament ===
==== Elimination round ====
Pos	Team	W	L	PCT	GB	Qualification
1	San Beda Red Cubs	13	5	.722 (Note: Head-to-head point differential: San Beda +4, Mapúa –4)	—	Twice-to-beat in the semifinals
2	Mapúa Red Robins	13	5	.722	—	Twice-to-beat in the semifinals
3	Letran Squires	11	7	.611 (Note: Head-to-head point differential: Letran +16, San Sebastian –5, LSGH –11; fourth-seed playoff: LSGH 108–82 San Sebastian)	2	Twice-to-win in the semifinals
4	La Salle Green Hills Greenies	11	7	.611	2	Twice-to-win in the semifinals
5	San Sebastian Staglets (H)	11	7	.611	2	
6	Perpetual Junior Altas	8	10	.444 (Note: Head-to-head point differential: UPHSD +15, Arellano –15)	5	
7	Arellano Braves	8	10	.444	5	
8	LPU Junior Pirates	7	11	.389	6	
9	JRU Light Bombers	6	12	.333	7	
10	EAC–ICA Brigadiers	2	16	.111	11	

Source: ABS-CBN Sports
Rules for classification: 1) winning percentage; 2) if tied for #2 or #4, one-game playoff; 3) head-to-head point differential; 4) overall point differential
(H) Hosts

===== Bracket =====
Semifinals (Nos. 1 & 2 have twice-to-beat advantage)
1	San Beda–Rizal	72	108
2	LSGH	83	110***
3	Malayan	82
4	Letran	80

Finals (Best-of-three series)
4	LSGH	74	81	75
2	Malayan	68	91	74

*Game went into overtime

== Volleyball ==
The volleyball tournament of NCAA Season 93 started on January 4, 2018 at the Filoil Flying V Arena. San Sebastian College-Recoletos is the event host. All teams will participate in an elimination round which is a round robin tournament. The top four teams qualify in the semifinals, where the unbeaten team bounces through the finals, with a thrice-to-beat advantage, higher-seeded team possesses the twice-to-beat advantage, or qualify to the first round. The winners qualify to the finals.

=== Men's tournament ===
==== Elimination round ====
Pos	Team	Pld	W	L	Pts	SW	SL	SR	SPW	SPL	SPR	Qualification
1	Perpetual Altas	9	9	0	26	27	3	9.000	741	578	1.282	Finals
2	Arellano Chiefs	9	8	1	22	24	9	2.667	767	624	1.229	Semifinals with a twice-to-beat advantage
3	San Beda Red Lions	9	7	2	21	21	10	2.100	736	639	1.152	First-round playoff
4	Benilde Blazers	9	6	3	19	23	11	2.091	751	684	1.098	First-round playoff
5	Mapúa Cardinals	9	5	4	15	17	14	1.214	745	719	1.036	
6	EAC Generals	9	4	5	12	16	20	0.800	728	804	0.905	
7	JRU Heavy Bombers	9	2	7	8	12	22	0.545	700	784	0.893	
8	San Sebastian Stags (H)	9	2	7	6	9	24	0.375	681	772	0.882	
9	LPU Pirates	9	2	7	5	10	24	0.417	718	818	0.878	
10	Letran Knights	9	0	9	1	5	27	0.185	635	780	0.814	

Rules for classification: 3 points = win match in 3 or 4 sets; 2 points = win match in 5 sets; 1 point = lose match in 5 sets; 0 point = lose match in 3 or 4 sets
(H) Season host

==== Final round ====
First round (One-game playoff)
3	San Beda	2
4	Benilde	3

Semifinals (No. 2 seed has twice-to-beat advantage)
2	Arellano	3
4	Benilde	0

Finals (Best-of-three series)
1	Perpetual	2	3	3
2	Arellano	3	1	1

=== Women's tournament ===
==== Elimination round ====
Pos	Team	Pld	W	L	Pts	SW	SL	SR	SPW	SPL	SPR	Qualification
1	Arellano Lady Chiefs	9	8	1	23	25	7	3.571	761	572	1.330	Semifinals with a twice-to-beat advantage
2	San Beda Red Lionesses	9	8	1	21	24	13	1.846	830	750	1.107	Semifinals with a twice-to-beat advantage
3	Perpetual Lady Altas	9	7	2	20	23	13	1.769	803	765	1.050	Semifinals
4	JRU Lady Bombers	9	6	3	18	22	14	1.571	796	754	1.056	Semifinals
5	San Sebastian Lady Stags (H)	9	5	4	17	21	14	1.500	818	702	1.165	
6	Benilde Lady Blazers	9	5	4	13	18	17	1.059	807	729	1.107	
7	Letran Lady Knights	9	3	6	9	13	21	0.619	691	787	0.878	
8	EAC Lady Generals	9	2	7	7	13	25	0.520	727	847	0.858	
9	LPU Lady Pirates	9	1	8	6	11	25	0.440	674	830	0.812	
10	Mapúa Lady Cardinals	9	0	9	1	6	27	0.222	634	805	0.788	

Rules for classification: 3 points = win match in 3 or 4 sets; 2 points = win match in 5 sets; 1 point = lose match in 5 sets; 0 point = lose match in 3 or 4 sets
(H) Season host

==== Final round ====
Semifinals (Nos. 1 & 2 have twice-to-beat advantage)
1	Arellano	3
4	JRU	0
2	San Beda	3
3	Perpetual	0

Finals (Best-of-three series)
1	Arellano	3	3
2	San Beda	2	0

=== Juniors' tournament ===
==== Elimination round ====
Pos	Team	Pld	W	L	Pts	SW	SL	SR	SPW	SPL	SPR	Qualification
1	EAC–ICA Brigadiers	7	6	1	17	20	9	2.222	676	617	1.096	Semifinals with a twice-to-beat advantage
2	La Salle Green Hills Greenies	5	4	1	11	13	7	1.857	464	438	1.059	Semifinals
3	Perpetual Junior Altas	4	3	1	9	9	3	3.000	291	230	1.265	Semifinals
4	Letran Squires	5	3	2	9	10	7	1.429	395	363	1.088	
5	LPU Junior Pirates	6	2	4	6	8	15	0.533	478	505	0.947	
6	Arellano Braves	3	1	2	4	6	6	1.000	264	253	1.043	
7	San Beda Red Cubs	5	1	4	3	5	13	0.385	348	441	0.789	
8	San Sebastian Staglets (H)	5	0	5	1	4	15	0.267	381	342	1.114	

Rules for classification: 3 points = win match in 3 or 4 sets; 2 points = win match in 5 sets; 1 point = lose match in 5 sets; 0 point = lose match in 3 or 4 sets
(H) Season host

==== Final round ====
Fourth-seed playoff
LSGH	2
Letran	3

Semifinals; Top seeds twice-to-beat
1	EAC–ICA	1
2	Letran	3	3
3	Perpetual	3
4	Arellano	1

Finals; Best-of-three series
4	Letran	1	0
2	Perpetual	3	3

== Chess ==
=== Seniors tournament ===
Team standings

Pos	Team	Pld	W	L	PCT	GB
1	Arellano Chiefs	0	0	0	—	—
2	Letran Knights	0	0	0	—	—
3	Benilde Blazers	0	0	0	—	—
4	EAC Generals	0	0	0	—	—
5	JRU Heavy Bombers	0	0	0	—	—
6	LPU Pirates	0	0	0	—	—
7	Mapúa Cardinals	0	0	0	—	—
8	San Beda Red Lions	0	0	0	—	—
9	San Sebastian Stags (H)	0	0	0	—	—
10	Perpetual Altas	0	0	0	—	—

Rules for classification: 1) winning percentage; 2) if tied for #2 or #4, one-game playoff; 3) head-to-head record; 4) head-to-head point differential; 5) overall point differential
(H) Hosts

Match-up results

Team ╲ Game	1	2	3	4	5	6	7	8	9
AU									
CSJL									
CSB									
EAC									
JRU									
LPU									
MU									
SBC									
SSC–R									
UPHSD									

= Win; = Draw; = Loss

==== Scores ====
Team	AU	CSJL	CSB	EAC	JRU	LPU	MU	SBC	SSC-R	UPHSD
AU		–	–	–	–	–	–	–	–	–
CSJL	–		–	–	–	–	–	–	–	–
CSB	–	–		–	–	–	–	–	–	–
EAC	–	–	–		–	–	–	–	–	–
JRU	–	–	–	–		–	–	–	–	–
LPU	–	–	–	–	–		–	–	–	–
MU	–	–	–	–	–	–		–	–	–
SBC	–	–	–	–	–	–	–		–	–
SSC-R	–	–	–	–	–	–	–	–		–
UPHSD	–	–	–	–	–	–	–	–	–	

Legend: Blue = left column team win; Red = top row team win.

=== Juniors tournament ===
Team standings

Pos	Team	Pld	W	L	PCT	GB
1	Arellano Braves	0	0	0	—	—
2	Letran Squires	0	0	0	—	—
3	La Salle Green Hills Greenies	0	0	0	—	—
4	EAC–ICA Brigadiers	0	0	0	—	—
5	JRU Light Bombers	0	0	0	—	—
6	LPU Junior Pirates	0	0	0	—	—
7	Mapúa Red Robins	0	0	0	—	—
8	San Beda Red Cubs	0	0	0	—	—
9	San Sebastian Staglets (H)	0	0	0	—	—
10	Perpetual Junior Altas	0	0	0	—	—

Rules for classification: 1) winning percentage; 2) if tied for #2 or #4, one-game playoff; 3) head-to-head record; 4) head-to-head point differential; 5) overall point differential
(H) Hosts

Match-up results

Team ╲ Game	1	2	3	4	5	6	7	8	9
AU									
CSJL									
LSGH									
EAC–ICA									
JRU									
LPU									
MHSS									
SBC–R									
SSC–R									
UPHSD									

= Win; = Draw; = Loss

==== Scores ====
Team	AU	CSJL	LSGH	EAC-ICA	JRU	LPU	MHSS	SBC-R	SSC-R	UPHSD
AU		–	–	–	–	–	–	–	–	–
CSJL	–		–	–	–	–	–	–	–	–
LSGH	–	–		–	–	–	–	–	–	–
EAC-ICA	–	–	–		–	–	–	–	–	–
JRU	–	–	–	–		–	–	–	–	–
LPU	–	–	–	–	–		–	–	–	–
MHSS	–	–	–	–	–	–		–	–	–
SBC-R	–	–	–	–	–	–	–		–	–
SSC-R	–	–	–	–	–	–	–	–		–
UPHSD	–	–	–	–	–	–	–	–	–	

Legend: Blue = left column team win; Red = top row team win.

== Badminton ==
=== Seniors tournament ===
Rank	Team	W	L
1	Arellano Chiefs	0	0
2	Letran Knights	0	0
3	Benilde Blazers	0	0
4	EAC Generals	0	0
5	JRU Heavy Bombers	0	0
6	LPU Pirates	0	0
7	Mapúa Cardinals	0	0
8	**San Beda Red Lions**	0	0
9	Perpetual Altas	0	0

Qualified to the Finals with the twice to beat advantage
Qualified to the Finals

Event host in **boldface**

Match-up results

Team ╲ Game	1	2	3	4	5	6	7	8
AU	EAC school colors	Letran school colors	JRU school colors	CSB school colors	Mapua school colors	San Beda school colors	UPHD school colors	Lyceum school colors
CSJL	JRU school colors	Arellano school colors	Mapua school colors	San Beda school colors	UPHD school colors	Lyceum school colors	EAC school colors	CSB school colors
CSB	JRU school colors	UPHD school colors	Arellano school colors	Lyceum school colors	Mapua school colors	EAC school colors	San Beda school colors	Letran school colors
EAC	Arellano school colors	Mapua school colors	San Beda school colors	UPHD school colors	Lyceum school colors	CSB school colors	Letran school colors	JRU school colors
JRU	Letran school colors	CSB school colors	Arellano school colors	Mapua school colors	San Beda school colors	UPHD school colors	Lyceum school colors	JRU school colors
LPU	Mapua school colors	San Beda school colors	Letran school colors	UPHD school colors	CSB school colors	EAC school colors	Letran school colors	JRU school colors
MU	Lyceum school colors	EAC school colors	JRU school colors	Arellano school colors	CSB school colors	San Beda school colors	UPHD school colors	Arellano school colors
SBC	UPHD school colors	Lyceum school colors	EAC school colors	Letran school colors	JRU school colors	Arellano school colors	Mapua school colors	CSB school colors
UPHSD	San Beda school colors	CSB school colors	Lyceum school colors	EAC school colors	Letran school colors	JRU school colors	Arellano school colors	Mapua school colors

= Win; = Loss

==== Scores ====
Team	AU	CSJL	CSB	EAC	JRU	LPU	MU	SBC	UPHSD
AU		–	–	–	–	–	–	–	–
CSJL	–		–	–	–	–	–	–	–
CSB	–	–		–	–	–	–	–	–
EAC	–	–	–		–	–	–	–	–
JRU	–	–	–	–		–	–	–	–
LPU	–	–	–	–	–		–	–	–
MU	–	–	–	–	–	–		–	–
SBC	–	–	–	–	–	–	–		–
UPHSD	–	–	–	–	–	–	–	–	

Legend: Blue = left column team win; Red = top row team win.

=== Women's tournament ===
Rank	Team	W	L
1	Arellano Lady Chiefs	0	0
2	Letran Lady Knights	0	0
3	Benilde Lady Blazers	0	0
4	EAC Lady Generals	0	0
5	LPU Lady Pirates	0	0
6	Mapúa Lady Cardinals	0	0
7	**San Beda Red Lionesses**	0	0
8	Perpetual Lady Altas	0	0

Qualified to the Finals with the twice to beat advantage
Qualified to the Finals

Event host in **boldface**

Match-up results

Team ╲ Game	1	2	3	4	5	6	7
AU	EAC school colors	Letran school colors	Lyceum school colors	UPHD school colors	San Beda school colors	Mapua school colors	CSB school colors
CSJL	Mapua school colors	Arellano school colors	EAC school colors	CSB school colors	Lyceum school colors	UPHD school colors	San Beda school colors
CSB	UPHD school colors	EAC school colors	San Beda school colors	Letran school colors	Mapua school colors	Lyceum school colors	Arellano school colors
EAC	Arellano school colors	CSB school colors	Letran school colors	Lyceum school colors	UPHD school colors	San Beda school colors	Mapua school colors
LPU	San Beda school colors	Mapua school colors	Arellano school colors	EAC school colors	Letran school colors	CSB school colors	UPHD school colors
MU	Letran school colors	Lyceum school colors	UPHD school colors	San Beda school colors	CSB school colors	Arellano school colors	EAC school colors
SBC	Lyceum school colors	UPHD school colors	CSB school colors	Mapua school colors	Arellano school colors	EAC school colors	Letran school colors
UPHSD	CSB school colors	San Beda school colors	Mapua school colors	Arellano school colors	EAC school colors	Letran school colors	Lyceum school colors

= Win; = Loss

==== Scores ====
Team	AU	CSJL	CSB	EAC	LPU	MU	SBC	UPHSD
AU		–	–	–	–	–	–	–
CSJL	–		–	–	–	–	–	–
CSB	–	–		–	–	–	–	–
EAC	–	–	–		–	–	–	–
LPU	–	–	–	–		–	–	–
MU	–	–	–	–	–		–	–
SBC	–	–	–	–	–	–		–
UPHSD	–	–	–	–	–	–	–	

Legend: Blue = left column team win; Red = top row team win.

=== Juniors tournament ===
Rank	Team	W	L
1	Arellano Braves	0	0
2	Letran Squires	0	0
3	La Salle Green Hills Greenies	0	0
4	EAC–ICA Brigadiers	0	0
5	JRU Light Bombers	0	0
6	LPU Junior Pirates	0	0
7	Mapúa Red Robins	0	0
8	**San Beda Red Cubs**	0	0
9	San Sebastian Staglets	0	0

Qualified to the Finals with the twice to beat advantage
Qualified to the Finals

Event host in **boldface**

Match-up results

Team ╲ Game	1	2	3	4	5	6	7	8
AU	EAC school colors	Lyceum school colors	Mapua school colors	CSB school colors	Letran school colors	San Beda school colors	SSC-R school colors	JRU school colors
CSJL	JRU school colors	EAC school colors	Lyceum school colors	Mapua school colors	Arellano school colors	CSB school colors	San Beda school colors	SSC-R school colors
LSGH	SSC-R school colors	Mapua school colors	JRU school colors	Arellano school colors	EAC school colors	Letran school colors	Lyceum school colors	San Beda school colors
EAC–ICA	Arellano school colors	Letran school colors	San Beda school colors	SSC-R school colors	JRU school colors	CSB school colors	Lyceum school colors	Mapua school colors
JRU	Letran school colors	San Beda school colors	SSC-R school colors	CSB school colors	EAC school colors	Lyceum school colors	Mapua school colors	Arellano school colors
LPU	Mapua school colors	Arellano school colors	Letran school colors	San Beda school colors	SSC-R school colors	JRU school colors	EAC school colors	CSB school colors
MHSS	Lyceum school colors	CSB school colors	Arellano school colors	Letran school colors	San Beda school colors	SSC-R school colors	JRU school colors	EAC school colors
SBC–R	SSC-R school colors	JRU school colors	EAC school colors	Lyceum school colors	Mapua school colors	Arellano school colors	Letran school colors	CSB school colors
SSC–R	San Beda school colors	CSB school colors	JRU school colors	EAC school colors	Lyceum school colors	Mapua school colors	Arellano school colors	Letran school colors

= Win; = Loss

==== Scores ====
Team	AU	CSJL	LSGH	EAC-ICA	JRU	LPU	MHSS	SBC-R	SSC-R
AU		–	–	–	–	–	–	–	–
CSJL	–		–	–	–	–	–	–	–
LSGH	–	–		–	–	–	–	–	–
EAC-ICA	–	–	–		–	–	–	–	–
JRU	–	–	–	–		–	–	–	–
LPU	–	–	–	–	–		–	–	–
MHSS	–	–	–	–	–	–		–	–
SBC-R	–	–	–	–	–	–	–		–
SSC-R	–	–	–	–	–	–	–	–	

Legend: Blue = left column team win; Red = top row team win.

== Swimming ==
=== Men's tournament ===
#	Team	Total
1st place, gold medalist(s)	**San Beda Red Lions**	0
2nd place, silver medalist(s)	Benilde Blazers	0
3rd place, bronze medalist(s)	San Sebastian Stags	0
4	Arellano Chiefs	0
5	EAC Admirals	0
6	Letran Knights	0
7	Perpetual Altas	0
8	Mapúa Cardinals	0
9	LPU Pirates	0
10	JRU Heavy Bombers	-

Season host is boldfaced.

=== Women's tournament ===
#	Team	Total
1st place, gold medalist(s)	**San Beda Red Lionesses**	0
2nd place, silver medalist(s)	Benilde Lady Blazers	0
3rd place, bronze medalist(s)	EAC Lady Generals	0
4	Arellano Lady Chiefs	0
5	LPU Lady Pirates	0
6	Mapúa Lady Cardinals	0
7	JRU Lady Bombers	-
8	Letran Lady Knights	0
9	San Sebastian Lady Stags	0
10	Perpetual Lady Altas	-

Season host is boldfaced.

=== Juniors' tournament ===
#	Team	Total
1st place, gold medalist(s)	La Salle Green Hills Greenies	0
2nd place, silver medalist(s)	**San Beda Red Cubs**	0
3rd place, bronze medalist(s)	LPU Junior Pirates	0
4	San Sebastian Staglets	0
5	Letran Squires	0
6	Mapúa Red Robins	0
7	EAC–ICA Brigadiers	0
8	Perpetual Junior Altas	0
9	Arellano Braves	0
10	JRU Light Bombers	0

Season host is boldfaced.

== See also ==
- UAAP Season 80

== Broadcast coverage ==
Play-by-play:

- Andrei Felix
- Martin Javier
- Anton Roxas

Analysts (basketball)

- Mikee Reyes
- Renren Ritualo
- Jio Jalalon
- Topex Robinson
- Jimmy Alapag

Courtside reporters:

- Sarah Carlos
- Roxanne Montealegre
- Ana Ramsey
- Ceej Tantengco

=== Previous courtside reporter of NCAA ===
- Gelliemae Obeña
- Princess Legaspi
