= Lyceum Pirates, Lady Pirates and Junior Pirates =

Athletic team of Lyceum of the Philippines University

LPU Pirates and Lady Pirates
- School: Lyceum of the Philippines University
- League: National Collegiate Athletic Association (NCAA)
- Joined: 2011 (ISAA founding member - 2004)
- Location: Seniors - Muralla St. Intramuros, Manila, Philippines; Juniors - Governor's Drive, General Trias Cavite, Philippines
- Team colors: International Red; Silver Grey
- Fight song: Viva! Larga! Pirata!
- Women's team: Lady Pirates
- Juniors' team: Junior Pirates

Seniors' general championships
- NCAA: 0; ISAA: 2 (2009-2010, 2010-2011)

Juniors' general championships
- NCAA: 0

The LPU Pirates and Lady Pirates are the athletic teams that represent the Lyceum of the Philippines University and play in the National Collegiate Athletic Association (Philippines), the oldest athletic association in the Philippines. Lyceum has collegiate men's varsity teams that participate in fifteen sporting events of the NCAA. They are also popularly known as the "Pirata ng Intramuros" (Pirates of Intramuros). The Lady Pirates volleyball team also played in the Premier Volleyball League (PVL).

The university's high school varsity basketball team is from the university's International High School in Cavite and are called the Junior Pirates.

The university teams have taken part in various sports leagues and tournaments such as the Filoil Flying V Preseason Cup, Fr. Martin's Cup, Philippine Collegiate Champions League, Milcu Sports Basketball Presents Got Skills Premier League, PBA Developmental League and Premier Volleyball League (PVL). Lyceum of the Philippines University is the youngest member of the NCAA.

== History ==
=== National Collegiate Athletic Association ===
Lyceum is one of the six candidates sought by the NCAA Management Committee (MANCOM) as a replacement for Philippine Christian University. In 2009, however, Lyceum failed to complete the necessary requirements to join the league, including the existence of a high school program. Two years later, Lyceum was finally accepted as a guest-team member, completed the necessary requirements including having a high school department located in its Cavite campus.

In 2015, Lyceum was finally admitted to the NCAA as a regular member.

=== Inter-Scholastic Athletic Association ===
Lyceum together with FEATI University, Manila Doctors College, Southville International School and Colleges, Manila Adventist Medical Center and Colleges and La Consolacion College Manila formed the Inter-Scholastic Athletic Association (ISAA) back in 2009. They eventually became the basketball champions both men's and women's up until the 2010 season. After the 2010 season they left the league to pursue their dreams in the NCAA.

=== Women's National Collegiate Athletic Association ===
In the WNCAA they are back-to-back champions in 2010 and 2011 respectively. Right now they are on hiatus.

== Alma Mater ==
The alma mater song is "Awit ng Lyceum". The composer of Lyceum Hymn is no other than late Professor Paulino Capitulo. Music by Bb. Pricilla Ladicas. This was adopted by the school's NCAA basketball team, band and cheerleaders. It eventually became a ritual, sung with arms raised and fists clenched symbolizing Lyceum's enduring school spirit. The singing of the alma mater hymn by Lyceans after a sports event (whether in victory or defeat), alumni homecoming, or other special gatherings became a tradition.

== Sports ==
The Lyceum of the Philippines University is one of 10 schools that participate in all of the fifteen sporting events of the National Collegiate Athletic Association (NCAA). The names of the school's collegiate varsity teams participating in these fifteen sports are shown in the table below.

=== Men's Basketball ===
==== History ====
Prior to joining the NCAA, the Lyceum Pirates was a member of National Capital Region Athletic Association (NCRAA), producing players such as Gary David and Chico Lanete, who led their team in three runners-up finishes in the early 2000s. During the off-season, they join other tournaments such as Home and Away Invitational League (HAIL), Fr. Martin Cup, among others.

In 2009, Lyceum and other schools formed Inter-Scholastic Athletic Association (ISAA). Lyceum, led by long-time coach Bonnie Tan and ISAA MVP Joseph Abaya, became the inaugural champions of the league.

In 2010, the Pirates, led by Joseph Abaya, Rich Guevarra, Fritz Gerald Ong, and ISAA MVP Reggie Rimando, claimed back-to-back ISAA titles after sweeping La Consolacion College Blue Royals in their Best-of-Three Finals series. With their title conquest, the Pirates gained a Sweet 16 slot for the 2010 Philippine Collegiate Championship. After the season, Lyceum left ISAA to seek a membership in the NCAA.

Lyceum finally entered the NCAA as a guest team in 2011. In 2014, after finishing seventh place, long-time head coach Bonnie Tan stepped down from his position.

In 2015, Lyceum is now elevated as a regular member of the NCAA. Lyceum management hired former San Sebastian Stags mentor Topex Robinson as its new head coach. However they failed to make it to the Final Four since joining the league. In 2016, former San Sebastian Stag CJ Perez transferred to Lyceum after his brief stint in Ateneo.

In 2017, the Pirates, led by CJ Perez, MJ Ayaay, and Cameroonian Mike Nzeusseu, swept the elimination rounds, finally entered the playoffs and secured the first Finals berth for the first time since joining the league. However, they were swept by the defending champions San Beda Red Lions. CJ Perez was named season MVP.

Entering the 2018 season, the Pirates are still the favorites to win the title after they failed to capture it last season. Finishing 15–3 win–loss record, Lyceum placed 2nd and again barged in the playoffs and faced the Letran Knights in the Final Four. Led again by CJ Perez and Mike Nzeusseu, the Pirates demolished the Knights, 109–85, and entered the Finals. Again, they faced their tormentors last season, the San Beda Red Lions. Before facing San Beda in the best-of-three Finals series, the league suspended CJ Perez for one game after failing to inform the NCAA of his intention to join the 2018 PBA Draft. Without CJ Perez, the Red Lions manhandled the Pirates in Game 1, 73–60. Head coach Topex Robinson avoided suspension after he aired his public criticism of the league over the suspension of Perez to the media. Even though CJ Perez returned to play in Game 2 after his suspension, San Beda swept the Pirates and claimed its third straight championship.

In 2019, the Pirates, led by holdovers Mike Nzeusseu and the Marcelino twins, Jayvee and Jaycee, finished second after the elimination rounds and awaiting the winner of the first round of the step-ladder match between the Stags and the Knights. Lyceum then faced Letran in the second round of the step-ladder semifinals. However, they failed to defeat the Knights in the semifinals. Jaycee Marcelino was named one of the Mythical Five of the season.

In 2020, longtime Lyceum assistant coach Jeff Perlas replaced Topex Robinson as the new head coach of the Lyceum Pirates after the latter was promoted to interim head coach, and then full-time head coach of the Phoenix Fuel Masters in the PBA. Topex Robinson, however, will remain to Lyceum as a team consultant.

==== Current rosters ====
LPU Pirates roster
Players
Coaches

Pos.	No.	Nat.	Name	Height	Year	High School
SF	19	(Philippines)	Almario, James	6'0" (1.83m)	–	–
PF	34	(Philippines)	Aurigue, Lance	6'5" (1.96m)	–	–
C	29	(Philippines)	Aviles, Genesis	6'5" (1.96m)	–	St Jude College Dasmariñas Cavite
F	11	(Philippines)	Caduyac, Khen	5'9" (1.75m)	–	Lyceum of the Philippines University – Cavite
PF	18	(Philippines)	Cardinas, Iven	6'4" (1.93m)	–	–
SG	28	(Philippines)	Daileg, Jonathan	6'4" (1.93m)	–	–
SG	27	(Philippines)	Fuentes, Nath	6'0" (1.83m)	–	–
SF	5	(Canada)	Gordon, Omar	6'1" (1.85m)	–	–
TC	7	(Philippines)	Guadaña, Mclaude (C)	5'11" (1.8m)	–	Lyceum of the Philippines University – Cavite
PG	33	(Philippines)	Manuel, Axl	5'11" (1.8m)	–	–
F	12	(Philippines)	Matienzo, Jasper	6'3" (1.91m)	–	–
SG SF	2	(Philippines)	Nocum, Carl	6'1" (1.85m)	–	–
PF	22	(Philippines)	Ondoa, Roger	6'3" (1.91m)	–	–
PG	10	(Philippines)	Pallingayan, Iyon	5'8" (1.73m)	–	–
C	14	(Philippines)	Panelo, JD	6'4" (1.93m)	–	–
SG	1	(Philippines)	Peñafiel, Simon	6'1" (1.85m)	3rd	Our Lady of Fatima University
PG	26	(Philippines)	Rubico, Matthew	5'11" (1.8m)	–	–
PG	20	(Philippines)	Villegas, Renz Adrian	5'8" (1.73m)	3rd	Colegio de San Juan de Letran

Head coach

- (Philippines) Gilbert Malabanan

Assistant coach(es)

- (Philippines) Patrick Melencio
- (Philippines) Ian Sangco
- (Philippines) Kevin Lacap
- (Philippines) John Lopez
- (Philippines) Robert Joseph Guevarra
- (Philippines) Monch Gavieres

Legend

- (C) Team captain
- Injured

- Roster
Updated: 2024-09-03

==== Notable players ====
- Ato Agustin - Former coach of San Sebastian Stags in the NCAA and of Petron Blaze Boosters and Barangay Ginebra San Miguel and current assistant coach of the San Miguel Beermen in the PBA.
- Leo Austria - Current team consultant of the San Miguel Beermen in the PBA who also led the team to multiple championship as a head coach.
- Gary David - Former player who played for the Air21 Express, Coca-Cola/Powerade Tigers, Meralco Bolts, San Miguel Beermen and Mahindra Floodbusters in the PBA as well as the Bataan Risers and Pampanga Giant Lanterns of the MPBL, Former player and Assistant coach for the LPU Pirates in the NCAA.
- Dante Gonzalgo - Former player who played for the San Miguel Beermen and Ginebra San Miguel/Añejo Rhum 65ers in the PBA.
- Chico Lanete - Former player who played for several teams in the PBA.
- Jaycee Marcelino - Currently playing for the Zamboanga Master Sardines of the MPBL.
- Joey Mente - Former professional basketball player in the Philippine Basketball Association who played for the San Miguel Beermen and Welcoat Dragons. 2001 PBA Slam Dunk Champion
- CJ Perez - Currently playing for the San Miguel Beermen in the PBA. He also played for the Terrafirma Dyip. Won PBA Rookie of the Year in 2019.

=== Volleyball ===
Women's volleyball

==== Women's volleyball roster ====
NCAA Season 95

Lyceum Lady Pirates
No.	Name	Position
2	ACUNA, Jacqueline	
4	STA. MARIA, Lois	
5	MAPULA, Melenie	
7	GALENO, Carol Joy	Libero
9	WANTA, Ciarnelle (c)	Outside Spiker
10	RAFAEL, Alxandra	Opposite spiker
11	BELARO, Camille	Libero
12	DOGUNA, Joan	
14	SEVILLA, Monica Jane	Middle blocker
15	PUZON, Venice	Setter
16	DAHAB, Zonki	
17	ONOFRE, Mary Joy	Middle blocker
18	AMAR, Elidel Rofe	
20	EXCIJA, Princess	

- Head coach: Emiliano "Emil" Lontoc
- Assistant coach: Benjie Mape

==== Men's volleyball roster ====
NCAA Season 93

Lyceum Pirates
No.	Name	Position
2	LAJARA, Joshua D.	
3	ESTAÑERO, Janssen C.	
4	ILLANO, Diego J.	Middle BLocker
5	RUBIO, Jeri Christian A.	
7	ARLANZA, Leandro S.	
8	LEBICO, Paul Nathaniel N.	Libero
9	BADUA, Jhonel S.	Outside Hitter
10	SAMONTE, Kimuel T.	
11	PRESNEDE, Joeward D.	
13	UY CORAL, Siegfred Joaquin M. (c)	Setter
14	SAPORNA, Sinmart S.	
15	ESPIRITU, Gabriel F.	
22	DEMATERA, John Clifford G.	

- Head coach: Emiliano "Emil" Lontoc
- Assistant coach: Benjie Mapre

==== Beach volleyball ====
NCAA Season 93

Women's

- Bien Elaine B. Juanillo
- Christine M. Miralles
- Monica Janet T. Sevilla

Men's

- Jhonel H. Badua
- Joward D. Presnede
- Sinmart S. Saporna

Juniors

- Allen Angelo Calicdan
- Deon Xander Colorado
- Genesis Allan Redido

=== Cheerleading ===
- LPU Pirates PEP Squad
- LPU Pirates Drum Squad

== Number of Championships ==
The following table shows the number of championships of Lyceum of the Philippines University in the National Collegiate Athletic Association (NCAA).

Sport	Men's	Women's	Total
Basketball	0	0	0
Volleyball	0	0	0
Football	0	0	0
Fencing	0	0	0
Chess	0	0	0
Judo	0	0	0
Taekwondo	0	0	0
Table Tennis	0	0	0
Tennis	0	0	0
Swimming	0	0	0
Track and Field	0	0	0
Badminton	0	0	0
Beach Volleyball	0	0	0
Baseball	0	0	0
Softball	0	0	0
Total	0	0	0

== See also ==
- Battle of Intramuros
