= PAREF Southridge Admirals =

- School: PAREF Southridge
- League: UAAP
- Location: Muntinlupa, Metro Manila, Philippines
- Team colors: Green, blue

Juniors' general championships
- UAAP: None

The PAREF Southridge Admirals is the high school varsity team of the PAREF Southridge of Muntinlupa, Metro Manila, Philippines. They take part in the University Athletic Association of the Philippines (UAAP) as a guest school.

== History ==
The PAREF Southridge School announced their entry to the University Athletic Association of the Philippines (UAAP) in November 2024. The Southridge Admirals debuted at the Season 87 in 2025 finishing as semifinalists in the boys' football tournament.

For Season 88 (2025–26), they began participating in athletics, swimming, baseball, tennis, and fencing. The Admirals joined that season's baseball tournament in 2026 which marked the return of high school baseball. They went on to won the boys' title becoming the first guest team to win a UAAP title.

They are set to make debuts in chess, and streetdance for Season 89.

== Baseball ==
Results

- Season 88: Champions
- Season 89: TBD

== Football ==
The boys football team are a two-time Final Four team. As of March 2026, it is led by Ghanaian head coach Sam Bonney.

Results

- Season 87: Semifinalists
- Season 88: Semifinalists
- Season 89: TBD
