= TV5 Network coverage of the NCAA =

- Also known as: NCAA on AKTV (2012–13); NCAA on Sports5 (2013–14); NCAA on RPTV (2026–present)
- Genre: College sports telecasts
- Developed by: One Sports/Cignal TV
- Starring: various commentators
- Country of origin: Philippines
- Original languages: Filipino; English

Production
- Production location: Various NCAA venues
- Camera setup: Multiple-camera setup
- Running time: varies
- Production company: Cignal TV

Original release
- Network: IBC 13 via AKTV (2012–2013) AksyonTV (after 2013), TV5
- Release: June 23, 2012 – March 10, 2015
- Network: One Sports (Note: via YouTube), RPTV, NCAA NXT
- Release: September 13, 2026 – present

Television coverage of the National Collegiate Athletic Association (Philippines) (NCAA) on TV5 Network, produced by its sports division One Sports (also known as previously known as Sports5, among other names), have been aired over the years, with its first iteration starting on NCAA Season 88 in 2012, and continued up to Season 90.

In July 15, 2026, Cignal TV signed a two season deal with the NCAA, marking a return to the network after it moved to ABS-CBN Sports in 2015.

== History ==
=== First iteration ===
==== AKTV (2012–2013) ====
On April 22, 2012, the NCAA signed a three season deal with Sports5 to cover NCAA games, beginning on Season 88. With the new contract signed, the league has able to schedule a Saturday game, of which its previous TV partner, ABS-CBN Sports, was unable to do so owing to its UAAP coverage. Regular games were aired on IBC 13 via its AKTV programming block, with the Final Four & Finals games airing on the main TV5 channel.

==== Move to AksyonTV and subsequent coverage (2013–2014) ====
However, in April 2013, TV5 no longer renewed its blocktime agreement with IBC, due to high airtime costs and low ratings. This prompted the games from Season 89 (2013) be moved to AksyonTV, raising concern from fans and by the league itself, owing to poor signal reception of the said channel at the time. Although TV5 continued to air Final Four and Finals games, some of the games did not air on the said network and instead aired on AksyonTV. For Season 90 (2014), some regular games have later aired on TV5. However, the NCAA decided to not renew its contract with Sports5, and instead opted a ten season deal with its former TV partner, ABS-CBN Sports.

=== Second iteration ===
Following GMA Network's decision to not renew its contract with the NCAA after Season 101 (2025), the league opened new bids for a new TV partner, of which only two submitted bids, being Cignal TV and Bilyonaryo News Channel. On July 15, 2026, Cignal TV emerged as the new TV partner of the NCAA, initially signing on a two season deal, beginning Season 102 (2026). The games will initially air on RPTV, with also being streamed live on One Sports (Note: All live NCAA games, including the Finals will be aired via its YouTube channel) and on Cignal Play. On August 31, during the league's press conference at the SM Mall of Asia Arena, Cignal announced its dedicated channel for the league, NCAA NXT.

== Personnel ==
=== First iteration ===
Play-by-play:

- Jing Jamlang
- Nikko Ramos
- Aaron Atayde
- James Velasquez
- Chiqui Reyes
- LA Mumar

Analyst:

- Dominic Uy
- Olsen Racela
- Don Allado
- Eric Reyes
- Richard del Rosario
- Willie Miller

Courtside reporters:

- Apple David
- Ai Dela Cruz
- Mara Aquino
- Denise Tan
- Jutt Sulit
- Rizza Diaz

=== 2nd iteration ===
Play-by-play:

- Jutt Sulit
- Stan Sy
- Sev Sarmenta
- Andre Co
- Andrei Caracut
- Anthony Suntay
- Jinno Rufino
- Carlo Pamintuan
- Rizza Diaz
Analyst:
- Allan Gregorio
- Andy Jao
- Eric Altamirano
- Eric Reyes
- Gab Banal
- Larry Fonacier
- Borgie Hermida
- Dominic Uy
- Ronnie Magsanoc
- Quinito Henson
- Prince Rivero

Courtside reporters:

- Nadj Miravalles
- Denisse Valdesancho
- Mae Reyes
- Fiona Bacani
- Belle Gregorio
- Ella Regudo
- Aiyana Perlas
- Baileys Acot
- Eileen Shi
- Ameera Almamari
