= Sports 360 =

- Developed by: Sports5
- Starring: See hosts
- Country of origin: Philippines
- Original languages: English; Filipino

Production
- Running time: 1 hour

Original release
- Network: Sports5 on TV5
- Release: February 1, 2015 – April 29, 2016

Related
- Sports5 Center; Sports5 Center (as PBA pre-game segment); SportsCenter Philippines (as sports newscast)

Sports 360 was a sports-oriented show developed by Sports5 and it is aired on TV5. It was previously known as a pre-game program for the PBA games from November 2014 until it became a spin-off since February 1, 2015. The show focused on the latest news in the PBA, United Football League, Pacific Xtreme Combat, and other sports, as well as sport interviews.

The show previously aired on Sunday afternoons before the PBA before moving to a late night timeslot to accommodate airing other sporting events on TV5.

== Final hosts ==
- Aaron Atayde
- Erika Padilla

=== Former hosts ===
- Nikko Ramos (2015)
- Mela Tunay (2015–2016)
- Ramon Bautista (2015–2016)
- Jojo The Love Survivor (2015–2016)

== Controversies ==
=== 'Kangkong' joke issue ===
On the May 17, 2015 episode, Atayde waved a 'kangkong' (water spinach) in front of former Barangay Ginebra San Miguel player Dylan Ababou, amid on questioning his return. The said joke caused a lot of Ginebra 'diehard' fans much to dismay. In June 2015, Atayde was suspended indefinitely by Sports5 management from all PBA-related shows.

== See also ==
- PBA on One Sports
