= NCAA Season 102 basketball tournaments =

Basketball season

NCAA Season 102
- "Strive. Believe. Unite. One League. One Community. One Pride."

Men's tournament
- Semifinalists: San Beda Red Lions; JRU Heavy Bombers; Letran Knights; EAC Generals

Juniors' tournament
- Semifinalists: JRU Light Bombers; Perpetual Junior Altas; La Salle Green Hills Greenies; EAC–ICA Brigadiers

The NCAA Season 102 basketball tournaments are the basketball tournaments of the National Collegiate Athletic Association (Philippines) for its 102nd season, during the 2026–27 academic year. The season is hosted by San Beda University. The opening ceremonies happened on September 13, 2026 at the SM Mall of Asia Arena.

The NCAA is expected to hold two tournaments, the men's tournament for male college students, and the juniors' tournament for male senior high school students.

== Tournament format ==
San Beda University, weeks after speculation of its teams transferring to the University Athletic Association of the Philippines, confirmed that it will host this season.

The new tournament format first used in NCAA Season 101 will be used this season. A key difference is that the fourth-seeded team will have the twice-to-beat advantage in the play-in round.

Rico Quicho was reappointed as basketball commissioner. Quicho continued his initiative in applying the FIBA rulebook to the NCAA.

After the Sunday opening day, the rest of the game days are on Mondays, Tuesdays, Thursdays and Fridays, with two juniors' games, then two men's games, involving the same schools.

== Teams ==
Men's teams
| Team | College | Coach | Uniform manufacturer |
|---|---|---|---|
| Arellano Chiefs | Arellano University (AU) | (Philippines) Chico Manabat | East Prnt Clothing |
| Letran Knights | Colegio de San Juan de Letran (CSJL) | (Philippines) Allen Ricardo | Serious Player Only |
| Benilde Blazers | De La Salle–College of Saint Benilde (CSB) | (Philippines) Paolo Layug | Anta |
| EAC Generals | Emilio Aguinaldo College (EAC) | (Philippines) Jerson Cabiltes | Infinite SportsWear |
| JRU Heavy Bombers | José Rizal University (JRU) | (Philippines) Nani Epondulan | XIV Activewear |
| Lyceum Pirates | Lyceum of the Philippines University (LPU) | (Philippines) Jamike Jarin | Anta |
| Mapúa Cardinals | Mapúa University (MU) | (Philippines) Chito Victolero | Anta |
| San Beda Red Lions | San Beda University (SBU) | (Philippines) Yuri Escueta | Anta |
| San Sebastian Stags | San Sebastian College – Recoletos (SSC–R) | (Philippines) Rodney Santos | Antbox |
| Perpetual Altas | University of Perpetual Help System DALTA (UPHSD) | (Philippines) Olsen Racela | LGR Sportswear |

Juniors' teams
| Team | High school | Coach |
|---|---|---|
| Arellano Braves | Arellano University High School (AU) | (Philippines) Anthony Urbano |
| Letran Squires | Colegio de San Juan de Letran (CSJL) | (Philippines) Andrew Estrella |
| EAC Brigadiers | Emilio Aguinaldo College (EAC) | (Philippines) Noy Catalan |
| JRU Light Bombers | José Rizal University (JRU) | (Philippines) Juan Miguel Martin |
| La Salle Green Hills Greenies | La Salle Green Hills (LSGH) | (Philippines) Renren Ritualo |
| Lyceum Junior Pirates | Lyceum of the Philippines University – Cavite (LPU–C) | (Philippines) Chico Lanete |
| Malayan Red Robins | Malayan High School of Science (MHSS) | (Philippines) Jeffrey Martin |
| San Beda Red Cubs | San Beda University – Rizal (SBU–R) | (Philippines) Britt Reroma |
| San Sebastian Staglets | San Sebastian College – Recoletos (SSC–R) | (Philippines) Richie Melencio |
| Perpetual Junior Altas | University of Perpetual Help System DALTA (UPHSD) | (Philippines) Joph Cleopas |

=== Coaching changes ===
| Team | Outgoing coach | Manner of departure | Date | Replaced by | Date |
|---|---|---|---|---|---|
| San Sebastian Stags | (Philippines) Rob Labagala | Fired | December 31, 2025 | (Philippines) Tony Tan | January 11, 2026 |
| San Sebastian Staglets | (Philippines) Chelito Caro | Fired | December 31, 2025 | (Philippines) Airness Alao | January 11, 2026 |
| Lyceum Pirates | (Philippines) Gilbert Malabanan | Fired | December 12, 2025 | (Philippines) Jamike Jarin | January 30, 2026 |
| Mapúa Cardinals | (Philippines) Randy Alcantara | Mutual consent | January 13, 2026 | (Philippines) Chito Victolero | February 25, 2026 |
| Lyceum Junior Pirates | (Philippines) Al Vergara | Fired | January 8, 2026 | (Philippines) Chico Lanete | April 18, 2026 |
| Benilde Blazers | (Philippines) Charles Tiu | Signed by Phoenix Super LPG Fuel Masters | January 20, 2026 | (Philippines) Paolo Layug | February 18, 2026 |
| San Sebastian Stags | (Philippines) Tony Tan | Abandonment | June 6, 2026 | (Philippines) Rodney Santos | July 20, 2026 |
| San Sebastian Staglets | (Philippines) Airness Alao | Contract rescinded | June 28, 2026 | (Philippines) Richie Melencio | August 2, 2026 |

=== Draw ===
The draw was held at the Philippine Columbian Association Sports Club on June 18, 2026. Just like last season, the previous season's finalists were grouped apart.

| Group A | Group B |
|---|---|
| Benilde/LSGH | Arellano |
| JRU | Letran |
| Lyceum | EAC |
| Mapúa | San Sebastian |
| San Beda | Perpetual |

Group A was adjudged to be the "group of death".

== Venues ==
Venues in Metro Manila

SM Mall of Asia Arena in Pasay hosted opening day. The Filoil EcoOil Centre will host majority of the group stage, play-in, quarterfinal and juniors' semifinals games, with select gamedays hosted by the PhilSports Arena in Pasig, and the San Andres Gym in Manila. The men's semifinals will be exclusively held at the SM Mall of Asia Arena in Pasay, while the men's finals will be at the MOA Arena and, game 3 if necessary at the Araneta Coliseum in Quezon City.

The Rizal Memorial Coliseum was supposed to host the October 9 gameday, but it was held at the PhilSports Arena instead.

| Arena | Location | M | J | Capacity |
|---|---|---|---|---|
| Araneta Coliseum | Quezon City | check | check | 14,429 |
| Filoil EcoOil Centre | San Juan | check | check | 6,000 |
| PhilSports Arena (ULTRA) | Pasig | check | check | 10,000 |
| San Andres Sports Complex (SAG) | Manila | check | check | 5,000 |
| SM Mall of Asia Arena (MOA) | Pasay | check | check | 15,000 |

== Squads ==
Each team can have up to 15 players on their roster, with an additional up to three players in the injured reserve list.

The ban of foreign student-athletes, called "imports" elsewhere, first applied in Season 96 (2020) is still in effect, requiring all players to be Filipinos.

Men's rosters
| Arellano | Letran | Benilde | EAC | JRU | Lyceum | Mapúa | San Beda | San Sebastian | Perpetual |
|---|---|---|---|---|---|---|---|---|---|
| Renzo Abiera | Mark Borrero | Jhommel Ancheta | Kyle Buen | Shawn Argente | Roger Ondoa | Russel Liwanag | Yukien Andrada | Rafael Are | John Abis |
| Anthony Borromeo | Chris John Dy | Joshua Cajucom | Jethro Bacud | Lance Benitez | Lance Aurigue | Jamal Diaz | JC Bonzalida | Matt Acosta | Josiah Alcantara |
| Leyton Buenaventura | Aaron James Buensalida | Jesseray Arciaga | Jude Bagay | John Canoza | Genesis Aviles | Yam Concepcion | Recaredo Calimag | Jerover Cabilla | Aries Borja |
| Anjord Cabotaje | Denzil Dominick Walker | Raffy Celis | EJ Castillo | Franzen Casinillo | McLaude Guadaña | Cyrus Cuenco | Joe Celzo | Clarence Cruz | JP Boral |
| Yuan Jerico Camay | Jimboy Estrada | Bonn Ernest Daja | Joshua Devara | Jayson Castillo | Matthew Rubico | Ken Bo | Ismael Culdora | Niel Castor | Andrew Casinillo |
| Karl Flores | Lorge Reinier Gammad | Ralph Baliquig | Ruzzelle Dominguez | Benedict Catapang | Jonathan Daileg | Marcus Nitura | Penny Estacio | Ian Cuajao | Kenji Duremdes |
| Joaquim De Leon | Lance Daniel Siena | Irele Galas | Adam Doria | Yuri Duque | Carl Nocum | Louis Razon | Zedjay Etulle | Jhuniel dela Rama | Angelo Gelsano |
| Ernjay Geromino | Jonathan Moses Manalili | Zenric Jarque | Mac Jacob | Paul Enal | Nathaniel Fuentes | Mackenzie Bernabe | Nygel Gonzales | Markus Dimaunahan | Mark Gojo Cruz |
| Joseph Cyril Hernal | Nathaniel Montecillo | Jio Alexis Gonzaga | Gelo Loristo | Gyllien Esguerra | Omar Gordon | Marc Igliane | Rafael Jalbuena | TJ Felebrico | Kevin Guibao |
| Matthew Langit | Ranz Ezekiel Muyuela | Nicholas Lorenzo | Edvil Mundas | Jay Garupil | Jasper Matienzo | Ivan Lazarte | Kyle Jamora | Ralph Gubat | Kylle Magdangal |
| Charles Libang | Justine Hugo | Allen Liwag | Kyle Ochavo | Harry Herrera | Iven Cardinas | Cyrus Nitura | Bismarck Lina | Jaime Gomez de Liaño | Ray Allen Maglupay |
| Aaron Dywane Manansala | Don Daryl Valdeavilla | John Morales | Wilmar Oftana | Allan Laurenaria | Axl Manuel | Sebastian Reyes | Agjanti Miller | Axcel Kitane | Jearico Nuñez |
| T-Mc Ongotan | George Diamante | SJ Moore | Jearolan Omandac | Justin Lozano | Lyon Pallingayan | Edward Ryan III | Jomel Puno | Jose Lumanag | Shawn Michael Orgo |
| Basti Sebastian Valencia | Kevin Santos | Matthew Jucom | Rico Postanes | Ivan Panapanaan | JD Panelo | Ken Dones | Jimuel Reyes | Gabriel Nepacena | Jan Pagulayan |
| Maverick King Vinoya | Alvin Rex Villanueva | Justine Sanchez | Nico Quinal | Jhun Peñaverde | Simon Peñafiel | Jamal Diaz | Bryan Sajonia | Thomas Pillado | Emmanuel Pizzaro |
| John Ray Ladica | Justin Rafael Cargo | Arle Podador | Jacob Shanoda | Sean Salvador | Jethro Reyes | Kyle Timbol | Menard Songcuya | Christian Ricio | Jan Roluna |
| Kyle Matthew Anama | Froilan Reyes Jr. | Ronjie Go | Joshua Tolentino | Vince Sarmiento | John Versoza | Gian Mendoza | Ron Rei Tolentino | Vincent Segovia | Patrick Sleat |
| Joseph Espiritu Jr. | | | Felix Villarente | Rasa Soleimani | Renz Villegas | | MJ Vailoces | Leonardo Velasco | Juan Tulabut |

== Men's tournament ==
The traditional opening game involving the defending champions was on September 13, with the San Beda Red Lions going up against the Benilde Blazers.

=== Group stage ===
Early in the September 18 game between San Beda and JRU, the game was stopped with 5:25 left in the first quarter due to rain leaks reaching the playing floor. Commissioner Rico Quicho later decided to call off the game, with the game to be resumed later on. The NCAA later announced that the game was rescheduled to September 26.

==== Group A ====
===== Team standings =====
| Pos | Team | W | L | PCT | GB | Qualification |
|---|---|---|---|---|---|---|
| 1 | San Beda Red Lions (H) | 10 | 3 | .769 (Note: Head-to-head record: San Beda 2–0 JRU) | — | Twice-to-beat in the quarterfinals |
| 2 | JRU Heavy Bombers | 10 | 3 | .769 | — | Twice-to-beat in the quarterfinals |
| 3 | Benilde Blazers | 8 | 5 | .615 | 2 | Twice-to-win in the quarterfinals |
| 4 | Mapúa Cardinals | 7 | 6 | .538 | 3 | Twice-to-beat in play-in round |
| 5 | Lyceum Pirates | 4 | 9 | .308 | 6 | Twice-to-win in play-in round |

Source: GMA News
(H) Hosts

===== Match-up results =====
| Team ╲ Game | First round | | | | Crossover round | | | | | Second round | | | |
| Team ╲ Game | 1 | 2 | 3 | 4 | 5 | 6 | 7 | 8 | 9 | 10 | 11 | 12 | 13 |
|---|---|---|---|---|---|---|---|---|---|---|---|---|---|
| Benilde | San Beda school colors | Lyceum school colors | JRU school colors | Mapua school colors | UPHD school colors | SSC-R school colors | Arellano school colors | EAC school colors | Letran school colors | Mapua school colors | Lyceum school colors | JRU school colors | San Beda school colors |
| JRU | Mapua school colors | CSB school colors | San Beda school colors | Lyceum school colors | Arellano school colors | SSC-R school colors | EAC school colors | Letran school colors | UPHD school colors | San Beda school colors | Lyceum school colors | Mapua school colors | CSB school colors |
| Lyceum | CSB school colors | Mapua school colors | San Beda school colors | JRU school colors | EAC school colors | Letran school colors | UPHD school colors | SSC-R school colors | Arellano school colors | JRU school colors | CSB school colors | San Beda school colors | Mapua school colors |
| Mapúa | JRU school colors | Lyceum school colors | CSB school colors | San Beda school colors | Arellano school colors | EAC school colors | Letran school colors | UPHD school colors | SSC-R school colors | CSB school colors | San Beda school colors | JRU school colors | Lyceum school colors |
| San Beda | CSB school colors | Lyceum school colors | JRU school colors | Mapua school colors | SSC-R school colors | Letran school colors | UPHD school colors | Arellano school colors | EAC school colors | JRU school colors | Mapua school colors | Lyceum school colors | CSB school colors |

Source: NCAA on Livestats
= Win; = OT win; = Loss; = OT loss

==== Group B ====
===== Team standings =====
| Pos | Team | W | L | PCT | GB | Qualification |
|---|---|---|---|---|---|---|
| 1 | Letran Knights | 9 | 4 | .692 | — | Twice-to-beat in the quarterfinals |
| 2 | EAC Generals | 7 | 6 | .538 | 2 | Twice-to-beat in the quarterfinals |
| 3 | Arellano Chiefs | 6 | 7 | .462 | 3 | Twice-to-win in the quarterfinals |
| 4 | Perpetual Altas | 4 | 9 | .308 | 5 | Twice-to-beat in play-in round |
| 5 | San Sebastian Stags | 0 | 13 | .000 | 9 | Twice-to-win in play-in round |

Source: GMA News

===== Match-up results =====
| Team ╲ Game | First round | | | | Crossover round | | | | | Second round | | | |
| Team ╲ Game | 1 | 2 | 3 | 4 | 5 | 6 | 7 | 8 | 9 | 10 | 11 | 12 | 13 |
|---|---|---|---|---|---|---|---|---|---|---|---|---|---|
| Arellano | SSC-R school colors | EAC school colors | UPHD school colors | Letran school colors | Mapua school colors | JRU school colors | CSB school colors | San Beda school colors | Lyceum school colors | UPHD school colors | Letran school colors | SSC-R school colors | EAC school colors |
| Letran | UPHD school colors | SSC-R school colors | EAC school colors | Arellano school colors | San Beda school colors | Lyceum school colors | Mapua school colors | JRU school colors | CSB school colors | SSC-R school colors | Arellano school colors | EAC school colors | UPHD school colors |
| EAC | UPHD school colors | Arellano school colors | Letran school colors | SSC-R school colors | Lyceum school colors | Mapua school colors | JRU school colors | CSB school colors | San Beda school colors | SSC-R school colors | UPHD school colors | Letran school colors | Arellano school colors |
| San Sebastian | Arellano school colors | Letran school colors | UPHD school colors | EAC school colors | San Beda school colors | CSB school colors | JRU school colors | Lyceum school colors | Mapua school colors | Letran school colors | EAC school colors | Arellano school colors | UPHD school colors |
| Perpetual | Letran school colors | EAC school colors | SSC-R school colors | Arellano school colors | CSB school colors | San Beda school colors | Lyceum school colors | Mapua school colors | JRU school colors | Arellano school colors | EAC school colors | SSC-R school colors | Letran school colors |

Source: NCAA on Livestats
= Win; = OT win; = Loss; = OT loss

==== Scores ====
Results above and to the right of the grey cells represent the first and crossover rounds; results below and to the left represent the second round.

| Teams | AU | CSJL | CSB | EAC | JRU | LPU | MU | SBU | SSC–R | UPHSD |
|---|---|---|---|---|---|---|---|---|---|---|
| Arellano Chiefs | | 82–81 | 82–94 | 91–87 | 62–64 | 57–62 | 55–69 | 56–55 | 98–72 | 88–65 |
| Letran Knights | 91–77 | | 83–72 | 91–80 | 70–66 | 96–86 | 67–69* | 65–74* | 99–62 | 84–77 |
| Benilde Blazers | — | — | | 78–86 | 69–73 | 98–82 | 82–77 | 77–68 | 73–66 | 81–79* |
| EAC Generals | 102–93 | 78–71 | – | | 74–84 | 89–79 | 84–89* | 86–89 | 94–87 | 72–83 |
| JRU Heavy Bombers | — | — | 85–79 | — | | 94–69 | 65–64 | 62–65 (Note: JRU was leading 9–3 with 5:25 left in the first quarter when the game was called off due to unsuitable playing conditions at the venue. The game was completely restarted eight days later.) | 102–78 | 72–70* |
| Lyceum Pirates | — | — | 103–107 | — | 78–81 | | 88–87 | 74–83 | 78–77 | 98–89 |
| Mapúa Cardinals | — | — | 69–71 | — | 58–71 | 71–68 | | 55–54 | 71–43 | 65–60* |
| San Beda Red Lions | — | — | 82–69 | — | 75–71 | 71–65 | 61–57 | | 85–55 | 71–63 |
| San Sebastian Stags | 61–69 | 89–91 | — | 64–96 | — | — | — | — | | 74–86 |
| Perpetual Altas | 65–58 | 83–85 | — | 89–92* | — | — | — | — | 82–75 | |

Source: NCAA on Livestats
Legend: Blue = left column team win; Red = top row team win.
Matches with lighter background shading were decided after overtime.

=== Bracket ===
Play-in round (No. 4 twice-to-beat)
B4 | Perpetual | 79
B5 | San Sebastian | 73
A4 | Mapúa | 83
A5 | Lyceum | 68

Quarterfinals (Top 2 twice-to-beat)
A1 | San Beda | 73
B4 | Perpetual | 71
B2 | EAC | 88
A3 | Benilde | 64
B1 | Letran | 86
A4 | Mapúa | 75
A2 | JRU | 81
B3 | Arellano | 70

Semifinals (Best-of-three playoff)
A1 | San Beda | ^
B2 | EAC | ^
B1 | Letran | ^
A2 | JRU | ^

Finals (Best-of-three playoff)
^
^
Third place playoff

^If necessary

=== Play-in round ===
The two lowest ranked teams play in the play-in round, with the fourth-seeded team having the twice-to-beat advantage.

==== (A4) Mapúa vs. (A5) Lyceum ====
After their second round loss against JRU, Mapúa qualified to the play-in round. Lyceum qualified for the play-in after losing to JRU in the second round.

NCAA NXT

November 12, 2026
3:00 p.m.

| Mapúa Cardinals | 83–68 | Lyceum Pirates |
Scoring by quarter: 24–21, 24–19, 20–22, 15–13
| Pts: Ivan Lazarte 25; Rebs: Russel Liwanag 6 Asts: Yam Concepcion 8 | | Pts: McLaude Guadaña 15; Rebs: Matthew Rubico 9 Asts: Roger Ondoa 5 |
Mapúa wins series in one game

Filoil EcoOil Centre, San Juan
Referees: A. Canete, R. Moreto, J. Tangkion

Ivan Lazarte scored 25 points, while missing just one field goal attempt to lead the Cardinals to the quarterfinals.

==== (B4) Perpetual vs. (B5) San Sebastian ====
San Sebastian qualified for the play-in after losing to Arellano in the second round. Perpetual was relegated to the play-in after EAC defeated Letran in the second round.

RPTV
NCAA NXT

November 12, 2026
5:00 p.m.

| Perpetual Altas | 79–73 | San Sebastian Stags |
Scoring by quarter: 27–20, 28–24, 9–15, 15–14
| Pts: Jim Corpuz 18; Rebs: Angelo Gelsano 13; Asts: Shawn Orgo 5 | | Pts: Kent Bacani 20; Rebs: Gabat, Muktimar 4 Asts: Muktimar, Alforque 3 |
Perpetual wins series in one game

Filoil EcoOil Centre, San Juan
Referees: J. Celeste, M. Felix, J. Mondigo

In the third quarter, Perpetual was leading 60–47 when San Sebastian made a 12–2 run to cut the lead to three points. The Stags tied the game at 64-all during the fourth quarter. Later in the quarter, with the game tied at 73-all, Shawn Orgo's basket and free-throws from Mark Gojo Cruz and Rey Maglupay provided the winning advantage for the Altas.

=== Quarterfinals ===
The top two teams per group have the twice-to-beat advantage, where they have to be beaten twice, while their opponents only once, to advance.

==== (A1) San Beda vs. (B4) Perpetual ====
San Beda clinched a quarterfinals berth with JRU's win over Mapua. They then secured the #1 seed with their group stage finale win against CSB. Perpetual clinched a quarterfinals berth with a play-in win against San Sebastian.

NCAA NXT

November 16, 2026
3:00 p.m.

| San Beda Red Lions | 73–71 | Perpetual Altas |
Scoring by quarter: 22–16, 8–18, 20–18, 23–19
| Pts: Aldous Torculas 20; Rebs: JC Bonzalida 7 Asts: Kyle Jamora 3 | | Pts: Mark Gojo Cruz 18; Rebs: Aries Borja 7 Asts: 6 players 2 each |
San Beda wins series in one game

Filoil EcoOil Centre, San Juan
Referees: A. Canete, R. Bacalso, F. Manalac

Down by two points, Mark Gojo Cruz drove to the basket; while he had seemingly clear path to the rim, he passed the ball to a wide open Rey Maglupay, who missed the supposed game-winning three.

==== (B1) Letran vs. (A4) Mapúa ====
Letran clinched the Group B #1 seed with its second round win against Arellano. Mapúa qualified to the quarterfinals by defeating Lyceum in the play-in. This match-up is a Battle of Intramuros quarterfinal.

NCAA NXT

November 17, 2026
3:00 p.m.

| Letran Knights | 86–75 | Mapúa Cardinals |
Scoring by quarter: 23–22, 27–14, 23–24, 13–15
| Pts: Justin Cargo 19; Rebs: Kevin Santos 6 Asts: Jonathan Mananlili 8 | | Pts: Ivan Lazarte 27; Rebs: Yam Concepcion 10; Asts: Russel Liwanag 6 |
Letran wins series in one game

Filoil EcoOil Centre, San Juan
Referees: H. Santos, R. Dionson, J. Tangkion

With Letran up by four points late in the fourth quarter, Denzil Walker started a 7–2 Letran run to put the game away from the Cardinals.

==== (A2) JRU vs. (B3) Arellano ====
EAC's win over Letran allowed idle Arellano to qualify to the quarterfinals outright. Arellano's loss against EAC relegated them to the #3 seed. Meanwhile, JRU clinched a quarterfinals berth after winning against Mapua. JRU then clinched the twice-to-beat advantage after their second-round win against CSB. The Heavy Bombers settled for the #2 seed when San Beda defeated Benilde.

RPTV
NCAA NXT

November 16, 2026
5:00 p.m.

| JRU Heavy Bombers | 81–70 | Arellano Chiefs |
Scoring by quarter: 22–19, 23–26, 19–14, 17–11
| Pts: Lawrence Mangubat 29; Rebs: Laurenaria, Panapanaan 8 Asts: Jhilian Palis 4 | | Pts: Renzo Abiera 12; Rebs: Vinoya, Ongotan 7 Asts: T-Mc Ongotan 4 |
JRU wins series in one game

Filoil EcoOil Centre, San Juan
Referees: H. Santos, R. Moretom J. Tangkion

Arellano reduced the lead to 70–73 late in the fourth quarter when Lawrence Mangubat scored all of JRU's remaining points to pull away.

==== (B2) EAC vs. (A3) Benilde ====
EAC's win over Letran allowed EAC and idle Arellano to qualify to the quarterfinals outright. EAC's wins against Arellano then propelled the former to the twice-to-beat advantage. Meanwhile, Benilde qualified to the quarterfinals after JRU's win over Mapua. They were relegated to the #3 seed after losing to San Beda.

RPTV
NCAA NXT

November 17, 2026
5:00 p.m.

| EAC Generals | 88–64 | Benilde Blazers |
Scoring by quarter: 20–20, 21–24, 28–7, 19–13
| Pts: Jude Bagay 26; Rebs: Joseph Nunag 8 Asts: Ochavo, Raymundo 5 | | Pts: Jhomel Ancheta 12; Rebs: Allen Liwag 11; Asts: Ian Torres 3 |
EAC wins series in one game

Filoil EcoOil Centre, San Juan
Referees: J. Celeste, A. Canete, F. Manalac

Benilde was leading 46–43 early in the third quarter when EAC had a 22–2 run to turn the lead in their favor, 69–51. The Generals never relinquished the lead since then.

=== Semifinals ===
The semifinals is a best-of-three playoff.

==== (A1) San Beda vs. (B2) EAC ====
San Beda qualified to its 20th consecutive semifinals. EAC qualified to its first semifinals since joining the NCAA in 2009 (Season 85).

NCAA NXT

November 23, 2026
3:00 p.m.

| San Beda Red Lions | vs. | EAC Generals |

SM Mall of Asia Arena, Pasay

RPTV
NCAA NXT

November 26, 2026
5:00 p.m.

| San Beda Red Lions | vs. | EAC Generals |

SM Mall of Asia Arena, Pasay

NCAA NXT

November 30, 2026
3:00 p.m.

| San Beda Red Lions | vs. | EAC Generals^ |

SM Mall of Asia Arena, Pasay

^If necessary

==== (B1) Letran vs. (A2) JRU ====
JRU qualified to their first semifinals appearance since 2017 (Season 93). Letran clinched its second consecutive semifinals appearance.

RPTV
NCAA NXT

November 23, 2026
5:00 p.m.

| Letran Knights | vs. | JRU Heavy Bombers |

SM Mall of Asia Arena, Pasay

NCAA NXT

November 26, 2026
3:00 p.m.

| Letran Knights | vs. | JRU Heavy Bombers |

SM Mall of Asia Arena, Pasay

RPTV
NCAA NXT

November 30, 2026
5:00 p.m.

| Letran Knights | vs. | JRU Heavy Bombers^ |

SM Mall of Asia Arena, Pasay

^If necessary

=== Third place playoff ===
The losing semifinalists proceed to the third place playoff.

December 4, 2026
3:00 p.m.

| SF1 loser | vs. | SF2 loser |

Filoil EcoOil Centre, San Juan

=== Finals ===
The winning semifinalists advance to the best-of-three finals.

December 7, 2026
5:00 p.m.

| SF1 winner | vs. | SF2 winner |

SM Mall of Asia Arena, Pasay

December 10, 2026
5:00 p.m.

| SF1 winner | vs. | SF2 winner |

SM Mall of Asia Arena, Pasay

December 15, 2026
5:00 p.m.

| SF1 winner | vs. | SF2 winner^ |

Araneta Coliseum, Quezon City

^If necessary

=== Awards ===
==== Players of the Week ====
The Collegiate Press Corps awards a "player of the week" throughout the season:

| Week | Player | Team |
|---|---|---|
| Week 1 | Denzil Sison-Walker | Letran Knights |
| Week 2 | T-Mc Ongotan | Arellano Chiefs |
| Week 3 | Yam Concepcion | Mapúa Cardinals |
| Week 4 | Justine Sanchez | Benilde Blazers |
| Week 5 | Cyrus Cuenco | Mapúa Cardinals |
| Week 6 | Aldous Torculas | San Beda Red Lions |
| Week 7 | Jimboy Estrada | Letran Knights |
| Week 8 | Lawrence Mangubat | JRU Heavy Bombers |
| Week 9 | EJ Castillo | EAC Generals |

=== Discipline ===
The following were issued suspensions for this season:

- Andrei Ugaddan of the San Beda Red Lions for incurring two technical fouls against the Mapua Cardinals. He served the suspension against the San Sebastian Stags.
- Coach Jamike Jarin of the Lyceum Pirates for incurring two technical fouls against the San Sebastian Stags. He served the suspension against the Arellano Chiefs.
- Kevin Santos of the Letran Knights for being ejected against the Benilde Blazers. He served the suspension against the San Sebastian Stags.
- RC Calimag of the San Beda Red Lions, for incurring two technical fouls against the Benilde Blazers. He served the suspension against the Perpetual Altas in the quarterfinals.

== Juniors' tournament ==
The Juniors' tournament started on September 14.

=== Group stage ===
==== Team standings ====
| Pos | Team | W | L | PCT | GB | Qualification |
|---|---|---|---|---|---|---|
| 1 | JRU Light Bombers | 10 | 3 | .769 | — | Twice-to-beat in the quarterfinals |
| 2 | La Salle Green Hills Greenies | 9 | 4 | .692 | 1 | Twice-to-beat in the quarterfinals |
| 3 | Mapúa Red Robins | 8 | 5 | .615 | 2 | Twice-to-win in the quarterfinals |
| 4 | San Beda Red Cubs (H) | 5 | 8 | .385 | 5 | Twice-to-beat in play-in round |
| 5 | Lyceum Junior Pirates | 0 | 13 | .000 | 10 | Twice-to-win in play-in round |

(H) Hosts

==== Match-up results ====
| Team ╲ Game | First round | | | | Crossover round | | | | | Second round | | | |
| Team ╲ Game | 1 | 2 | 3 | 4 | 5 | 6 | 7 | 8 | 9 | 10 | 11 | 12 | 13 |
|---|---|---|---|---|---|---|---|---|---|---|---|---|---|
| JRU | Mapua school colors | San Beda school colors | CSB school colors | Lyceum school colors | Arellano school colors | SSC-R school colors | EAC school colors | Letran school colors | UPHD school colors | San Beda school colors | Lyceum school colors | Mapua school colors | CSB school colors |
| LSGH | San Beda school colors | Lyceum school colors | JRU school colors | Mapua school colors | UPHD school colors | SSC-R school colors | Arellano school colors | EAC school colors | Letran school colors | Mapua school colors | Lyceum school colors | JRU school colors | San Beda school colors |
| Lyceum–Cavite | CSB school colors | Mapua school colors | San Beda school colors | JRU school colors | EAC school colors | Letran school colors | UPHD school colors | SSC-R school colors | Arellano school colors | JRU school colors | CSB school colors | San Beda school colors | Mapua school colors |
| Mapúa | JRU school colors | Lyceum school colors | CSB school colors | San Beda school colors | Arellano school colors | EAC school colors | Letran school colors | UPHD school colors | SSC-R school colors | CSB school colors | San Beda school colors | JRU school colors | Lyceum school colors |
| San Beda–Rizal | CSB school colors | JRU school colors | Lyceum school colors | Mapua school colors | SSC-R school colors | Letran school colors | UPHD school colors | Arellano school colors | EAC school colors | JRU school colors | Mapua school colors | Lyceum school colors | CSB school colors |

Source: NCAA on Livestats
= Win; = OT win; = Loss; = OT loss

==== Group B ====
===== Team standings =====
| Pos | Team | W | L | PCT | GB | Qualification |
|---|---|---|---|---|---|---|
| 1 | Perpetual Junior Altas | 10 | 3 | .769 | — | Twice-to-beat in the quarterfinals |
| 2 | EAC–ICA Brigadiers | 8 | 5 | .615 | 2 | Twice-to-beat in the quarterfinals |
| 3 | Letran Squires | 7 | 6 | .538 | 3 | Twice-to-win in the quarterfinals |
| 4 | Arellano Braves | 5 | 8 | .385 | 5 | Twice-to-beat in play-in round |
| 5 | San Sebastian Staglets | 3 | 10 | .231 | 7 | Twice-to-win in play-in round |

===== Match-up results =====
| Team ╲ Game | First round | | | | Crossover round | | | | | Second round | | | |
| Team ╲ Game | 1 | 2 | 3 | 4 | 5 | 6 | 7 | 8 | 9 | 10 | 11 | 12 | 13 |
|---|---|---|---|---|---|---|---|---|---|---|---|---|---|
| Arellano | SSC-R school colors | EAC school colors | UPHD school colors | Letran school colors | Mapua school colors | JRU school colors | CSB school colors | San Beda school colors | Lyceum school colors | UPHD school colors | Letran school colors | SSC-R school colors | EAC school colors |
| Letran | UPHD school colors | SSC-R school colors | EAC school colors | Arellano school colors | San Beda school colors | Lyceum school colors | Mapua school colors | JRU school colors | CSB school colors | SSC-R school colors | Arellano school colors | EAC school colors | UPHD school colors |
| EAC | UPHD school colors | Arellano school colors | Letran school colors | SSC-R school colors | Lyceum school colors | Mapua school colors | JRU school colors | CSB school colors | San Beda school colors | SSC-R school colors | UPHD school colors | Letran school colors | Arellano school colors |
| San Sebastian | Arellano school colors | Letran school colors | UPHD school colors | EAC school colors | San Beda school colors | CSB school colors | JRU school colors | Lyceum school colors | Mapua school colors | Letran school colors | EAC school colors | Arellano school colors | UPHD school colors |
| Perpetual | Letran school colors | EAC school colors | SSC-R school colors | Arellano school colors | CSB school colors | San Beda school colors | Lyceum school colors | Mapua school colors | JRU school colors | Arellano school colors | EAC school colors | SSC-R school colors | Letran school colors |

Source: NCAA on Livestats
= Win; = OT win; = Loss; = OT loss

==== Scores ====
Results above and to the right of the grey cells represent the first and crossover rounds; results below and to the left represent the second round.

| Teams | AU | CSJL | EAC | JRU | LSGH | LPU–C | MHSS | SBU–R | SSC–R | UPHSD |
|---|---|---|---|---|---|---|---|---|---|---|
| Arellano Braves | | 82–95 | 80–98 | 84–85 | 101–112 | 83–69 | 83–96 | 70–69 | 92–77 | 97–104 |
| Letran Squires | 86–84 | | 70–67 | 61–62 | 65–76 | 73–68 | 74–69 | 98–69 | 88–58 | 82–81 |
| EAC–ICA Brigadiers | 78–86 | 82–72 | | 66–72 | 61–63 | 77–62 | 73–71 | 61–69 | 104–103 | 74–80 |
| JRU Light Bombers | — | — | — | | 78–76 | 79–69 | 78–64 | 99–57 | 93–68 | 86–82 |
| La Salle Green Hills Greenies | — | — | — | 89–88* | | 94–68 | 82–87 | 78–64 | 72–67 | 86–108 |
| Lyceum Junior Pirates | — | — | — | 38–58 | 83–94 | | 67–102 | 72–75 | 61–75 | 76–117 |
| Mapúa Red Robins | — | — | — | 70–62 | 70–75 | 78–70 | | 74–60 | 72–69 | 80–82 |
| San Beda Red Cubs | — | — | — | 65–55 | 78–75 | 72–41 | 71–73 | | 69–75 | 60–72 |
| San Sebastian Staglets | 71–90 | 81–76 | 81–88 | — | — | — | — | — | | 89–120 |
| Perpetual Junior Altas | 104–97* | 104–71 | 80–82 | — | — | — | — | — | 99–65 | |

Source: NCAA on Livestats
Legend: Blue = left column team win; Red = top row team win.
Matches with lighter background shading were decided after overtime.

=== Bracket ===
Play-in round (No. 4 twice-to-beat)
B4 | Arellano | 82
B5 | San Sebastian | 77
A4 | San Beda | 67 | 68
A5 | Lyceum | 68 | 49

Quarterfinals (Top 2 twice-to-beat)
A1 | JRU | 96*
B4 | Arellano | 93
B2 | EAC | 72
A3 | Mapúa | 66
B1 | Perpetual | 93
A4 | San Beda | 71
A2 | LSGH | 93
B3 | Letran | 75

Semifinals (Best-of-three playoff)
A1 | JRU | ^
B2 | EAC | ^
B1 | Perpetual | ^
A2 | LSGH | ^

Finals (Best-of-three playoff)
^
^
Third place playoff

*Overtime
^If necessary

=== Play-in round ===
The two lowest ranked teams play in the play-in round, with the fourth-seeded team having the twice-to-beat advantage.

==== (A4) San Beda vs. (A5) Lyceum ====
November 12, 2026
10:00 a.m.

| San Beda Red Cubs | 67–68 | Lyceum Junior Pirates |
Scoring by quarter: 23–21, 18–20, 8–7, 18–20
| Pts: Edlex Bonzalida 12; Rebs: Edlex Bonzalida 8 Asts: 3 players 3 each | | Pts: Aidan Pena 15; Rebs: Steven Creus 8 Asts: Enzo Guevarra 4 |

Filoil EcoOil Centre, San Juan
Referees: M. Dayandayan, A. Bermeo, O. Angeles

November 14, 2026
12:00 p.m.

| San Beda Red Cubs | 68–49 | Lyceum Junior Pirates |
Scoring by quarter: 24–14, 15–9, 12–12, 17–14
| Pts: Mark San Buenaventura 13; Rebs: Edlex Bonzalida 13; Asts: Sean Reroma 3 | | Pts: Steven Creus 14; Rebs: Jesus Yonzon 11; Asts: Aidan Pena 3 |
San Beda wins series in two games

Filoil EcoOil Centre, San Juan
Referees: T. Celeste, H.A. Santos, A. Bermeo

==== (B4) Arellano vs. (B5) San Sebastian ====
November 12, 2026
12:00 p.m.

| Arellano Braves | 82–77 | San Sebastian Staglets |
Scoring by quarter: 20–13, 20–21, 19–20, 23–23
| Pts: Laurence Pillas 20; Rebs: Tristan Teoc 6 Asts: Laurence Pillas 7 | | Pts: Jaf Tepan 25; Rebs: John Ramiso 13; Asts: Khaizer Castillo 6 |
Arellano wins series in one game

Filoil EcoOil Centre, San Juan
Referees: A. Bagadiong, H.A. Santos, J. Buce

=== Quarterfinals ===
The top two teams per group have the twice-to-beat advantage, where they have to be beaten twice, while their opponents only once, to advance.

==== (A1) JRU vs. (B4) Arellano ====
November 16, 2026
10:00 a.m.

| JRU Light Bombers | 96–93 (OT) | Arellano Braves |
Scoring by quarter: 20–22, 24–22, 26–19, 13–20, Overtime: 13–10
| Pts: Johnlord Cruz 28; Rebs: Johnlord Cruz 15; Asts: Luis Lugtu 7 | | Pts: Laurence Pillas 24; Rebs: Laurence Pillas 13; Asts: Laurence Pillas 7 |
JRU wins series in one game

Filoil EcoOil Centre, San Juan
Referees: B. Banayat, J. Mondigo, A. Bermeo

==== (B1) Perpetual vs. (A4) San Beda ====
November 17, 2026
10:00 a.m.

| Perpetual Junior Altas | 93–71 | San Beda Red Cubs |
Scoring by quarter: 34–19, 19–18, 16–13, 24–21
| Pts: Francis Rosales 19; Rebs: Brian Orca 8 Asts: 3 players 3 each | | Pts: Dwayne Nonato 14; Rebs: Edlex Bonzalida 10; Asts: Mahatma Adong 6 |
Perpetual wins the series in one game

Filoil EcoOil Centre, San Juan
Referees: G. Bulauan, D. Lesigues, R. Moreto

==== (A2) LSGH vs. (B3) Letran ====
November 16, 2026
12:00 p.m.

| La Salle Green Hills Greenies | 93–75 | Letran Squires |
Scoring by quarter: 25–18, 25–19, 23–21, 20–17
| Pts: Calo-oy, Hizon 21; Rebs: Patrick Pasinos 9 Asts: Hizon, Jugo 5 | | Pts: Ethan Aguas 22; Rebs: Braga, Lumague 7 Asts: Travis Pascual 6 |
LSGH wins series in one game

Filoil EcoOil Centre, San Juan
Referees: T. Celeste, E. Canosa, R. Robles

==== (B2) EAC vs. (A3) Mapúa ====
November 17, 2026
12:00 p.m.

| EAC–ICA Brigadiers | 72–66 | Mapúa Red Robins |
Scoring by quarter: 16–19, 17–18, 11–11, 28–18
| Pts: Tristan Allam 16; Rebs: Xyriel Macahipay 10; Asts: Andrei Castro 5 | | Pts: Orbista, Panganiban 13 each Rebs: Gimony, Relojo 8 each Asts: Thirdy Docto 4 |
EAC wins series in one game

Filoil EcoOil Centre, San Juan
Referees: R. Balacao, J. Talledo, A. Bermeo

=== Semifinals ===
The semifinals is a best-of-three playoff.

==== (A1) JRU vs. (B2) EAC ====
November 24, 2026
11:00 a.m.

| JRU Light Bombers | vs. | EAC–ICA Brigadiers |

Filoil EcoOil Centre, San Juan

November 27, 2026
1:00 p.m.

| JRU Light Bombers | vs. | EAC–ICA Brigadiers |

PhilSports Arena, Pasig

December 1, 2026
11:00 a.m.

| JRU Light Bombers | vs. | EAC–ICA Brigadiers^ |

Filoil EcoOil Centre, San Juan

^If necessary

==== (B1) Perpetual vs. (A2) LSGH ====
November 24, 2026
1:00 p.m.

| Perpetual Junior Altas | vs. | La Salle Green Hills Greenies |

Filoil EcoOil Centre, San Juan

November 27, 2026
11:00 a.m.

| Perpetual Junior Altas | vs. | La Salle Green Hills Greenies |

PhilSports Arena, Pasig

December 1, 2026
1:00 p.m.

| Perpetual Junior Altas | vs. | La Salle Green Hills Greenies^ |

Filoil EcoOil Centre, San Juan

^If necessary

=== Third place playoff ===
The losing semifinalists proceed to the third place playoff.

December 4, 2026
12:00 p.m.

| SF1 loser | vs. | SF2 loser |

Filoil EcoOil Centre, San Juan

=== Finals ===
The winning semifinalists advance to the best-of-three finals.

December 7, 2026
2:00 p.m.

| SF1 loser | vs. | SF2 loser |

SM Mall of Asia Arena, Pasay

December 10, 2026
2:00 p.m.

| SF1 loser | vs. | SF2 loser |

SM Mall of Asia Arena, Pasay

December 15, 2026
2:00 p.m.

| SF1 loser | vs. | SF2 loser^ |

Araneta Coliseum, Quezon City

^If necessary

== Broadcasting ==
TV5 Network's coverage of the NCAA has all men's games airing live on NCAA NXT, and for Monday and Thursday games, the second men's game of the day live on RPTV, with the first game on tape delay right after the second game ends . All men's games are live streamed via One Sports's YouTube channel and on the CignalPlay app, while the juniors' games are live streamed on the NCAA Philippines YouTube channel.

== See also ==
- UAAP Season 89 basketball tournaments
