= ABS-CBN coverage of the UAAP =

Filipino sports television broadcasts

- Genre: College sports telecasts
- Directed by: Al Neri (2000–2020); Benny Rivera (2000–2001); Jun delos Santos (2000–2001); Abet Ramos (2002–2020); Raul de Ocampo (2002–2020)
- Country of origin: Philippines
- Original languages: Filipino, English
- No. of seasons: 20

Production
- Production locations: Various UAAP venues (event telecasts and studio segments)
- Camera setup: Multi-camera
- Running time: Varies
- Production company: ABS-CBN Sports

Original release
- Network: Studio 23 (2000–14); Balls (2008–15); ABS-CBN (2010–19); S+A (2014–20); Liga (2018–20); TFC (2014–20); iWant (2019–20)
- Release: July 15, 2000 – May 31, 2020

Television coverage of the University Athletic Association of the Philippines on ABS-CBN, produced by its sports division, ABS-CBN Sports have been aired over 20 years from UAAP Season 63 in 2000 until Season 82.

== History ==
=== 2000s ===
In 2000, the UAAP board was unsatisfied with how previous network SilverStar Sports handled the coverage. They opened bidding to the coverage rights, which ABS-CBN Sports won. ABS-CBN Sports won the rights to broadcast the games for five years, which they broadcast on Studio 23. Silverstar took ABS-CBN to court over the UAAP rights, but the case was dismissed. ABS-CBN began its coverage of the UAAP on July 15, the opening of Season 63. They brought new ideas and innovation to their coverage, such as the use of crane cameras, and introduced student courtside reporters. ABS-CBN also hyped up rivalries like Ateneo–La Salle's to get more people to watch the games. In 2002, they organized the UAAP NCAA All-Star Game for charity.

By 2005, they had been recognized for their coverage with two Catholic Mass Media Awards. Before the start of Season 68, the UAAP and ABS-CBN Sports successfully renegotiated for another five-year contract. Worth ₱65 million, the contract required the network to provide men’s and women’s basketball games full coverage, while other sports such as the men’s and women’s volleyball, football, and badminton championships were to be given airtime.

With the rights set to expire on March 31, 2010, bidding was made open for the rights to broadcast the UAAP. GMA and Solar Entertainment each made bids for the rights. ABS-CBN then introduced high definition broadcasting beginning with the UAAP's basketball games for Season 72. It also began expanding the UAAP's digital reach with its own video on demand website. Right before the second game of the Season 72 finals, the UAAP announced that Studio 23’s contract was renewed for another five years.

=== 2010s ===
The UAAP continued its growth on Studio 23, as it kept experiencing high ratings. In 2013, the women's volleyball match between the Ateneo Blue Eagles and De La Salle Green Archers drew a 2.7 rating, the second-best rated UAAP program on the network since ABS-CBN Sports took over as the league’s broadcaster.

On January 18, 2014, ABS-CBN Sports + Action (S+A) was launched, replacing Studio 23. This allowed ABS-CBN to focus more on their sports programming, such as the UAAP. In 2019, ABS-CBN S+A began airing UAAP juniors' basketball games. They had previously only aired the finals of the UAAP juniors.

=== 2020s ===
On March 15, 2020 the UAAP was forced to cancel the rest of Season 82 due to the COVID-19 pandemic and the community quarantine measures imposed in Metro Manila. This made S+A show re-runs of old UAAP basketball and volleyball games. The UAAP and ABS-CBN tried to negotiate on an extension of their deal, however, ABS-CBN's franchise expired, delaying extension talks. On May 5, 2020, S+A went off air. On July 16, 2020, ABS-CBN Sports officially shut down, and their employees were let go. A few months later, the UAAP was able to find a new broadcast partner in Cignal TV.

== List of broadcasters ==
=== Final on-air staff ===
==== Play by Play ====
- Boom Gonzales (2003–20)
- Anton Roxas (2009–20)
- Nikko Ramos (Courtside reporter: 2012, Basketball: 2015–20)
- Eric Tipan (2004–20)
- Billie Capistrano (Courtside reporter: 2012–13, Volleyball: 2018–20)
- Mico Halili (Basketball: 2000–02, 2015–20)
- Denice Dinsay (Courtside Reporter: 2016, Volleyball: 2020)
- Jing Jamlang (Football: 2016–20)
- Martin Javier (Basketball and Volleyball: 2018–20)
- Synjin Reyes (Volleyball: 2020)
- Carmela Tunay (Volleyball: 2020)
- Noreen Go (Volleyball: 2020)

==== Analysts ====
- Marco Benitez (Basketball: 2010–20)
- Migs Bustos (2011–20)
- Marielle Benitez-Javellana (Football play by play: 2015, Football: 2012–20)
- Kirk Long (Basketball and Volleyball: 2012–14, 2018–20)
- Mozzy Ravena (2013–20)
- Christian Luanzon (Basketball: 2015–20)
- Michele Gumabao (Volleyball: 2016, 2019–20)
- Enzo Flojo (2016–20)
- AJ Pareja (Volleyball: 2018–20)
- Anne Remulla-Canda (Volleyball: 2018–20)
- Bea Daez (Basketball and Volleyball: 2018–20)
- Martin Antonio (2018–20)
- Alyssa Valdez (Volleyball: 2019–20)
- Mikee Reyes (Basketball: 2019–20)
- Jett Manuel (Basketball: 2019–20)
- Bea de Leon (Volleyball: 2020)
- Nicole Tiamzon (Volleyball: 2020)
- John Vic De Guzman (Volleyball: 2020)

==== Courtside Reporters ====
- Frannie Reyes (2018–2020)
- Aiyana Perlas (2018–20)
- Makyla Chavez (2018–20)
- Rain Matienzo (2019–20)
- Mariz Domingo (2019–20)
- Baileys Acot (2019–20)
- Jaime Ascalon (2019–20)
- Yani Mayo (2019–20)

=== Notable past on-air staff ===
- Bill Velasco (Basketball Play by play: 2000)
- Jude Turcuatro (Basketball Play by play: 2000–03)
- Freddie Webb (Basketball analyst: 2000)
- Pia Arcangel (Courtside reporter: 2000)
- Dominic Uy (Basketball analyst: 2001–02)
- Mark Molina (Basketball analyst: 2000–01, 2004–14)
- Sev Sarmenta (Basketball Play by play: 2000–01; 2004–07)
- Dimples Romana (Courtside reporter: 2002)
- Gretchen Fullido (Courtside reporter: 2004–06)
- Alex Compton (Basketball analyst: 2005–06)
- Lia Cruz (Courtside reporter: 2005–06)
- Andi Manzano (Courtside reporter: 2007–08)
- Aaron Atayde (Courtside reporter: 2007–08, Play by play: 2009–10)
- Maan Panganiban (Courtside reporter: 2009–10)
- Charles Tiu (Basketball analyst: 2012)
- Apple David (Courtside reporter: 2012–13)
- Selina Dagdag-Alas (Courtside reporter: 2013)
- Tina Marasigan (Courtside reporter: 2011–14)
- Bea Fabregas (Courtside reporter: 2012–14)
- Tricia Robredo (Courtside reporter: 2013–14)
- Gretchen Ho (Analyst: 2014)
- Jeanine Tsoi (Courtside reporter: 2014)
- Laura Lehmann (Courtside reporter: 2014–15)
- Renren Ritualo (Basketball analyst: 2015)
- Ganiel Krishnan (Courtside reporter: 2015)
- Denden Lazaro (Volleyball analyst: 2016)
- Armand del Rosario (Football analyst: 2015)
- Natasha Alquiros (Football analyst: 2016–18)
- Bea Escudero (Courtside reporter: 2016)
- Ronnie Magsanoc (Basketball and volleyball analyst: 2003–2007, 2016–20)
- Ryan Gregorio (Basketball analyst: 2003–2007)
- Xavy Nunag (Basketball analyst: 2016)
- TJ Manotoc (Play by play and analyst: 2004–18)
- Martie Bautista (Courtside reporter: 2017–18)
- Anton del Rosario (Football analyst: 2018)
- Charo Soriano (Volleyball analyst: 2018)
- Melissa Gohing (Courtside reporter: 2018)

== UAAP coverage on other ABS-CBN-owned outlets ==
=== ABS-CBN ===
The first UAAP basketball game broadcast in the main ABS-CBN network was during the 2000 season between Ateneo and La Salle. Due to the UAAP's growing popularity, there were times when ABS-CBN would air UAAP basketball and also volleyball games, particularly the finals since 2010.

=== Balls ===
Balls was a cable television channel that launched on January 1, 2008. Although it mostly aired international sporting events, it was also used to air UAAP games. In 2015, it ceased airing.

=== TFC ===
In 2014, ABS-CBN announced that TFC would air all of the UAAP's games for Filipinos abroad.

=== Liga ===
On January 1, 2018, ABS-CBN launched Liga, a cable television channel that showed live UAAP games, beginning with Season 80, as well as classic games from as early as Season 70.

=== iWant ===
In 2019, iWant, the streaming service of ABS-CBN, launched iWant Sports, which allowed users to stream UAAP games and shows.

== See also ==
- University Athletic Association of the Philippines
- ABS-CBN Sports
- Cignal TV
