= SportsCenter Philippines =

- Genre: Sports news
- Created by: Chet Simmons†
- Directed by: Raffy Romano
- Country of origin: Philippines
- Original languages: English; Filipino

Production
- Production locations: TV5 Media Center, Mandaluyong
- Camera setup: Multi-camera
- Running time: 30-60 minutes
- Production company: One Sports (formerly ESPN5)

Original release
- Network: TV5
- Release: December 17, 2017 – March 7, 2020

Related
- SportsPage; The Game

SportsCenter Philippines is a Philippine television sports news broadcasting show broadcast by TV5. The show based on the American television SportsCenter. Originally anchored by Aaron Atayde, Magoo Marjon, Amanda Fernandez and Lia Cruz, it aired from December 17, 2017 to March 7, 2020. Atayde, Marjon, Fernandez, Cruz, Jinno Rufino and Cesca Litton-Kalaw serve as the final anchors. It airs every Wednesday & Friday at 9:30 PM and Saturdays & Sundays at 9:00 PM.

== History ==
Before the creation of SportsCenter Philippines, Sports5 had produced several editions of its own sports news show, mostly airs as a halftime show of its flagship broadcast property, the PBA.

=== AKTV Center ===
It was first known as AKTV Center, when TV5 airs its sports programs through AKTV block on IBC. It began airing on October 2, 2011, and serves as pre-game, halftime, and post-game show of the PBA games which began airing on AKTV on the same day. It was hosted by Patricia Bermudez-Hizon, with Mico Halili and Magoo Marjon as alternates. The format similar to Inside the NBA was adopted for the AKTV Center starting the 2011-12 Philippine Cup Quarterfinal round, usually having a three-man panel consisting of either Halili, Marjon, Bermudez-Hizon, Aaron Atayde and Dominic Uy. Special guests were added at the panel from time to time. Several characters were introduced for the segment, which also includes parodies of NBA players, namely "Kobesaya" (a look-alike of Kobe Bryant), "Jeremy Lin-ta" (Jeremy Lin) and "J.R. "Pepe" Smith" (J. R. Smith). AKTV Center airs from the IBC studios in Broadcast City but sometimes air from the playing venue during special occasions, notably the league's opening ceremonies and the jersey retirement of Robert Jaworski.

During the 2012 Commissioner's Cup, AKTV introduced "Home Court" with Lia Cruz as its host. The segment airs during the halftime break of the second game. However it only lasted for four episodes before returning to AKTV Center's original format.

AKTV Center ceased airing on May 31, 2013, along with AKTV block itself, following the expiration of blocktime agreement between TV5 and IBC by the end of the month. There were no formatted show aired during 2013 PBA Commissioner's Cup finals when the PBA games was transferred to TV5 and AksyonTV.

=== Sports5 Center ===
During TV5's airing of the 2013 FIBA Asia Championship from August 1–11, 2013, a similarly formatted pre-game show was included in the broadcast, which was named Sports5 Center. This incarnation was carried over for the PBA's 2013-14 season, however it was only aired during Sundays. Sports5 Center was replaced by Sports 360 in November 2014.

In November 2016, the pre-game show was again renamed as Sports5 Center, retiring the Sports 360 pre-game show.

Sports5 Center continued to air after Sports5 was renamed as ESPN5 on October 13, 2017. It ended on the Game 7 of the 2017 PBA Governors' Cup finals on October 27.

With the launch of Sports Center Philippines, ESPN5 replaced Sports Center with PBA Halftime Show to fill in on PBA halftime breaks.

=== Sports 360 ===
Sports 360 is a sports-oriented show that also served as a pre-game program for the PBA games during the 2014–15 season. It was shown via livestreaming at Sports5.ph, before the start of the PBA's first game during weekdays and on TV5 before the start of the second game during weekends. The show focused on the latest news in the league as well as other sports. It spun off as a separate show starting February 1, 2015, though a short version of the show, Sports 360 Blitz was introduced for the 2015–16 season as pre-game and post-game show of the PBA. Sports 360 ceased airing by 2016.

== Format ==
SportsCenter Philippines features the latest sports news and developments from the Philippines and around the world, with daily content contribution from SportsCenter of the Covering the latest in sports news, highlights and updates in its fast-paced format, SportsCenter Philippines concentrates on the biggest stories of the day and sports including the PBA, the NBA, American football, volleyball and more.

SportsCenter Philippines expands its coverage through its bulletin version SportsCenter Right Now (launched on November 24), airing during ESPN5 primetime programs, and a segment in News5's flagship newscast Aksyon Prime as SportsCenter sa Aksyon.

== Final presenters ==
=== Final main anchors ===
- Aaron Atayde (2017–20)
- Magoo Marjon (2017–20)
- Amanda Fernandez (2017–20)
- Lia Cruz (2017–20)
- Jinno Rufino (2018–20)
- Cesca Litton-Kalaw (2019–20)

=== Final substitute anchors and contributors ===
- Carla Lizardo (2018–20)
- Selina Dagdag (2018–20)
- Apple David (2018–20)
- Mich Del Carmen (2018–20)
- Eric Menk (2018–20)
- Noel Zarate (2019–20)

== Reporters ==
- Chino Lui Pio
- Rizza Diaz
- Denise Tan
- Chuck Araneta
- Carla Lizardo
- Lyn Olavario (also a reporter for News5)
- Renz Ongkiko
- Mark Zambrano

== Former presenters & reporters ==
- Mara Aquino
