= Magoo Marjon =

Filipino sports commentator

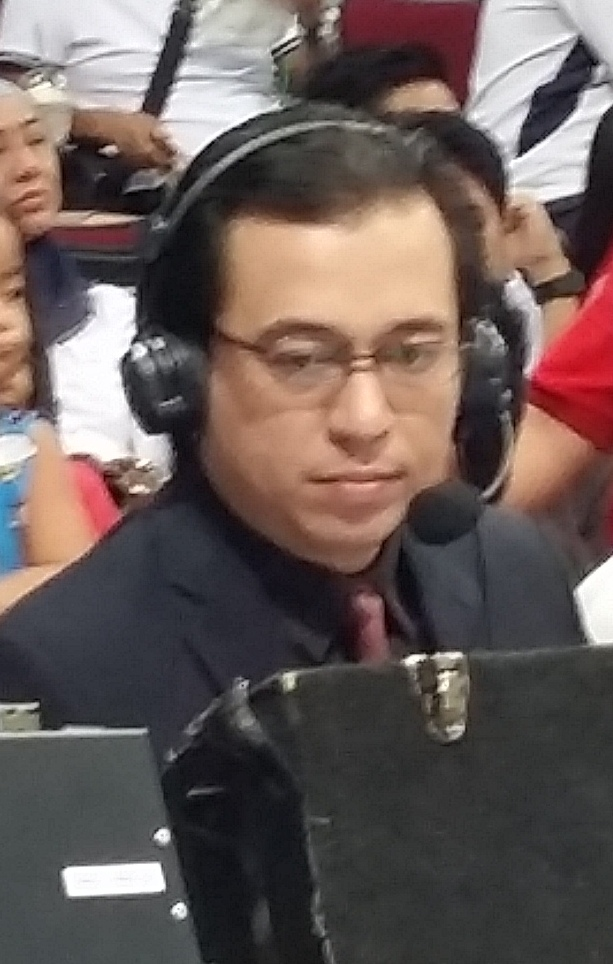
- Marjon in 2015
- Born: Magoo Marjon; September 26
- Education: De La Salle University
- Years active: 2004–present
- Title: Sportscaster
- Sports commentary career
- Genre: Color commnetator/Game analyst
- Sport: Basketball

Magoo Marjon is a Filipino sports play-by-play commentator. He is known for calling lines such as "Bang!" (like of Mike Breen), "May kasama pang foul" (when a player shoots the ball and gets fouled), and "Punches it through" (alternate to Bang!).

== Career ==
=== Early years ===
Marjon was in college at De La Salle University back when the Green Archers were winning championships under Franz Pumaren. He tried out to be a UAAP courtside reporter after noticing they had courtside seats. After not getting the role, he tried doing Philippine Basketball League (PBL) games, where he only did one game as an analyst. The PBL producers encouraged him to learn how to anchor games.

=== Radio ===
After graduation, Marjon left for the US, but stayed in touch with local producers through email. During his time in the US, he worked as a page for NBC Bay Area. He then received an email from broadcaster and sports editor Barry Pascua, who then set up an audition for RadyoPBA. He began his career with RadyoPBA in 2004.

=== Courtside reporting ===
In 2008, Marjon started his career as a courtside reporter for Philippine Basketball Association (PBA) games when it was still produced by Solar TV.

=== Play-by-play commentary ===
He was then elevated as a commentator for the radio coverage of the games. When Sports5 took over as the broadcaster of PBA games in 2010, Marjon was assigned as a play-by-play commentator. He also serves as a play-by-play commentator for other basketball leagues covered by Sports5, notably for the Pilipinas Commercial Basketball League (PCBL), PBA Developmental League (PBA D-League) and for international basketball tournaments such as the FIBA Asia Championship (2013 and 2015), 2014 FIBA World Cup, and 2016 Rio Olympics among others.

Marjon is known for yelling the word "BANG!" (or others such as "Punches it through!") after a key shot is made, usually very late in the game. Another catchphrase of his is "May kasama pang foul" (when a player shoots the ball and fouled). Some of his most famous calls include the following:

August 10, 2013 - Marjon called the 2013 FIBA Asia Championship. In the semifinals match between the Philippines and South Korea, with 54 seconds remaining and little time on the shot clock, Jimmy Alapag shot a nail-biting three that pushed their lead up to five. The Philippines went on to win the game.

“Six seconds to work with. Jimmy launches it… Baaang!”

In 2019, while he was calling Game 5 of the PBA Philippine Cup finals, a man dressed in a Spider-Man costume was caught streaking during the fourth quarter. Marjon then called him an idiot while describing the action. PBA commissioner Willie Marcial met with ESPN5 officials to address those comments. Marjon defended his comments on social media after the game.

=== Hosting ===
In 2006, Marjon was one of several hosts for Venta5, a home shopping TV show. From 2010 to 2013, he and Mico Halili were the hosts of FTW (For the Win), the first online sports show in the Philippines, for GMA News Online. From 2017 to 2020, he was one of several main anchors of SportsCenter Philippines. He and Carlo Pamintuan then hosted the podcast 2OT for two years.

=== Olympics ===
In 2016, Marjon, Pamintuan, and Patricia Bermudez-Hizon were selected to provide commentary for Asian viewers of the Rio Olympics. He covered basketball and athletics.

== Personal life ==
In 2016, while covering the Rio Olympics, Marjon and fellow Filipino reporter Lia Cruz were robbed of cash before the opening ceremony.
