= UAAP Season 89 football tournaments =

A football tournament in UAAP

UAAP Season 89 Football
- For Everyone, UAAP
- Host school: University of the Philippines
Women's Finals	G1	Wins
FEU Lady Tamaraws	1	1
De La Salle Lady Archers	0	0
- Arenas: Rizal Memorial Stadium, Manila
- Finals MVP: Sarahgen Tulabing
- Winning coach: Let Dimzon
- Semifinalists: UP Fighting Maroons; Ateneo Blue Eagles

The UAAP Season 89 collegiate division football tournament started with the women's tournament kicking offon September 23, 2026, and the men's tournament starting late on October 8, 2026 to support the men's football team's first Asian Games campaign in 52 years. The collegiate division is being played at the UP Diliman Football Stadium in Quezon City.

This is the first season to feature National University in the women's tournament. Rely San Agustin returns as the league commissioner for an eleventh season.

== Tournament format ==
The UAAP will use the UAAP Final Four format with a double round-robin elimination round format. The league continues to implement a twice-to-beat advantage in the Final Four for the higher-seeded teams if no team sweeps the elimination round. A stepladder format will be enacted if a team sweeps the elimination round.

With the women's tournament increasing to six teams, this will be the first season where all tournaments will have a knockout Final Four.

== Men's tournament ==
=== Elimination round ===
==== Team standings ====
Pos	Team	Pld	W	D	L	GF	GA	GD	Pts	Qualification
1	De La Salle Green Booters	11	8	2	1	25	8	+17	26	Twice-to-beat in the semifinals
2	Adamson Soaring Falcons	11	8	1	2	23	8	+15	25	Twice-to-beat in the semifinals
3	UP Fighting Maroons (H)	11	6	3	2	17	11	+6	21	Twice-to-win in the semifinals
4	UST Golden Booters	11	5	2	4	17	10	+7	17	Twice-to-win in the semifinals
5	FEU Tamaraws	11	3	4	4	22	17	+5	13	
6	Ateneo Blue Eagles	11	2	2	7	19	20	−1	8	
7	UE Red Warriors	12	0	0	12	3	52	−49	0	

Updated to match(es) played on November 22, 2026. Source: The UAAP
(H) Hosts

==== Match-up results ====
	Round 1						Round 2					
Team ╲ Game	1	2	3	4	5	6	7	8	9	10	11	12
Adamson Soaring Falcons	UST school colors	Ateneo school colors	UE school colors	FEU school colors	La Salle school colors	UP school colors	UP school colors	FEU school colors	UE school colors	La Salle school colors	UST school colors	Ateneo school colors
Ateneo Blue Eagles	La Salle school colors	Adamson school colors	UP school colors	UST school colors	UE school colors	FEU school colors	UP school colors	FEU school colors	UE school colors	La Salle school colors	UST school colors	Adamson school colors
De La Salle Green Booters	Ateneo school colors	UE school colors	FEU school colors	Adamson school colors	UP school colors	UST school colors	UE school colors	UST school colors	Ateneo school colors	Adamson school colors	UP school colors	FEU school colors
FEU Tamaraws	UE school colors	La Salle school colors	Adamson school colors	UP school colors	UST school colors	Ateneo school colors	UST school colors	Ateneo school colors	Adamson school colors	UP school colors	UE school colors	La Salle school colors
UE Red Warriors	FEU school colors	La Salle school colors	Adamson school colors	UP school colors	UST school colors	Ateneo school colors	La Salle school colors	UST school colors	Ateneo school colors	Adamson school colors	UP school colors	FEU school colors
UP Fighting Maroons	UST school colors	Ateneo school colors	UE school colors	FEU school colors	La Salle school colors	Adamson school colors	Ateneo school colors	Adamson school colors	FEU school colors	UE school colors	La Salle school colors	UST school colors
UST Golden Booters	Adamson school colors	UP school colors	Ateneo school colors	UE school colors	FEU school colors	La Salle school colors	FEU school colors	UE school colors	La Salle school colors	Ateneo school colors	Adamson school colors	UP school colors

Updated to match(es) played on November 22, 2026. Source: The UAAP
= Win; = Draw; = Loss

==== Results ====
School	AdU	ATENEO	DLSU	FEU	UE	UP	UST
Adamson Soaring Falcons		2–1	2–2	2–0	3–0	2–1	1–0
Ateneo Blue Eagles	–		0–3	1–2	2–1	1–1	0–2
De La Salle Green Booters	2–1	3–2		2–1	2–0	0–1	0–0
FEU Tamaraws	0–3	2–2	–		10–0	2–2	2–3
UE Red Warriors	0–5	0–9	0–8	1–2		0–1	0–3
UP Fighting Maroons	1–0	4–2	1–2	1–1	2–0		2–1
UST Golden Booters	1–2	1–0	0–1	1–1	5–1	–	

Updated to match(es) played on November 22, 2026. Source: The UAAP
Legend: Blue = left column team win; Yellow = draw; Red = top row team win.

=== Bracket ===
Semifinals (Top 2 twice-to-beat)
1
4	UST
2
3	UP

Finals (Best-of-three playoff)

=== Semifinals ===
The top two teams have the twice-to-beat advantage in the semifinals, where they have to be beaten twice, while their opponents just once, to advance.

=== Finals ===
The finals shall be a best-of-three playoff.

=== Statistics ===
As of November 19, 2026

==== Top goalscorers ====
Team eliminated / inactive for this round.

Rank	Player	Team	Round 1						Round 2						SF	F	Total
Rank	Player	Team	M1	M2	M3	M4	M5	M6	M7	M8	M9	M10	M11	M12	SF	F	Total
1	(Philippines) Dov Cariño	Ateneo Blue Eagles					2		1		3	1					7
2	(Philippines) Lucas Aguilar	De La Salle Green Archers	1			1			2	1	1						6
3	(Philippines) Ramil Bation III	UP Fighting Maroons	1	1	1				2								5
3	(Philippines) Theo Libarnes	FEU Tamaraws	2				1	1	1								5
3	(Philippines) Marlon Dasig	Adamson Soaring Falcons	1					2		1	1						5
6	(Philippines) Josh Balliner	UST Growling Tigers				1				3							4
6	(Philippines) Selwyn Mamon	FEU Tamaraws	3									1					4
6	(Philippines) Diego Quintin Angeles	Ateneo Blue Eagles						1			2	1					4
9	(Philippines) Karl Absalon	FEU Tamaraws	1	1			1										3
9	(Philippines) Joaquin Collo	De La Salle Green Archers	1		1				1								3
9	(Philippines) Fritz Kenzo Chua	Adamson Soaring Falcons		1		1	1										3
9	(Philippines) Joseph Garces	UP Fighting Maroons					1		2								3
9	(Philippines) Argos Alingalan	De La Salle Green Archers	1						2								3
9	(Philippines) Andrei Paolo Gonzales	Ateneo Blue Eagles								1	2						3
9	(Philippines) John Gaverza	De La Salle Green Archers		1		1					1						3
9	(Cameroon) Golike Doko	Adamson Soaring Falcons			1					1	1						3
9	(Philippines) Jemar Andrade	Adamson Soaring Falcons					1			1	1						3
9	(Philippines) Joses Azur	UP Fighting Maroons				1		1				1					3
9	(Philippines) Uriel Dalapo	De La Salle Green Archers			1				1			1					3
9	(Philippines) James Sibla	De La Salle Green Archers							2			1					3

==== Hat-tricks ====
Player	School	Result	Against	Date
(Philippines) Selwyn Mamon	FEU Tamaraws	10–0^{1}	UE Red Warriors	4 October 2026
(Philippines) Josh Balliner	UST Growling Tigers	5–1^{2}	UE Red Warriors	8 November 2026
(Philippines) Dov Cariño	Ateneo Blue Eagles	9–0^{2}	UE Red Warriors	12 November 2026

Note

^{1} Round 1
^{2} Round 2

==== Own goals ====
Rank	Player	School	Against	Own goals
1	Christian Dave Dy	UE Red Warriors	Adamson Soaring Falcons	1

==== Top assists ====
Rank	Player	School	Assists
1	(Philippines) Joaquin Collo	De La Salle Green Archers	8
2	(Cameroon) Golike Doko	Adamson Soaring Falcons	6
3	(Philippines) Andrei Paolo Gonzales	Ateneo Blue Eagles	5
4	(Philippines) John Gaverza	De La Salle Green Archers	4
5	(Philippines) Karl Absalon	FEU Tamaraws	3
5	(Philippines) Lucas Aguilar	De La Salle Green Archers	3
5	(Philippines) Renz Timothy Partosa	Ateneo Blue Eagles	3

==== Clean sheets ====
Rank	Player	School	Matches
1	(Philippines) Jed Lauron	Adamson Soaring Falcons	5
2	(Philippines) Cesar Castro III	De La Salle Green Archers	4
2	(Philippines) Mark Daig	UST Growling Tigers	4
4	(Philippines) Quintin Lance Sanchez	FEU Tamaraws	1
4	(Philippines) Fonzy Gonzalez	UP Fighting Maroons	1
4	(Philippines) John Oberes	UP Fighting Maroons	1
4	(Philippines) Paolo Tansingco	Ateneo Blue Eagles	1
4	(Philippines) Roger Dudley-Scales	Adamson Soaring Falcons	1

==== Player of the Match ====
Rank	Player	School	Matches	Against
1	(Philippines) Joaquin Collo	De La Salle Green Archers	5	Ateneo^{1}, UE^{1}, FEU^{1}, UST^{1},, UE^{2}
2	(Philippines) Ramil Bation III	UP Fighting Maroons	4	UST^{1}, Ateneo^{1}, UE^{1}, FEU^{2}
3	(Philippines) Cesar Castro III	De La Salle Green Archers	3	Adamson^{1}, UST^{2}
4	(Philippines) Theo Libarnes	FEU Tamaraws	2	UE^{1}, Ateneo^{1}
4	(Philippines) Joshua Balliner	UST Growling Tigers	2	UE^{1,2}
4	(Philippines) Jed Lauron	Adamson Soaring Falcons	2	FEU^{1,2}
4	(Philippines) Dov Cariño	Ateneo Blue Eagles	2	UE^{1,2}
4	(Philippines) Renan Ballespin	UST Growling Tigers	2	Ateneo^{1,1}
9	(Philippines) Marlon Dasig	Adamson Soaring Falcons	1	UST^{1}
9	(Philippines) Mark Christian Ricario	Adamson Soaring Falcons	1	Ateneo^{1}
9	(Philippines) Kim Cabuag	Adamson Soaring Falcons	1	UE^{1}
9	(Philippines) Miguel Basmayor	UP Fighting Maroons	1	La Salle^{1}
9	(Philippines) Jan Baito	UST Growling Tigers	1	FEU^{1}
9	(Philippines) Quintin Lance Sanchez	FEU Tamaraws	1	UP^{1}
9	(Cameroon) Golike Doko	Adamson Soaring Falcons	1	UP^{1}
9	(Philippines) Joseph Garces	UP Fighting Maroons	1	Ateneo^{2}
9	(Philippines) John Paul Selarde	UST Growling Tigers	1	FEU^{2}
9	(Philippines) Joed Pleños	UP Fighting Maroons	1	Adamson^{2}
9	(Philippines) Andrei Paolo Gonzales	Ateneo Blue Eagles	1	FEU^{2}
9	(Philippines) Tristan Lawas	Adamson Soaring Falcons	1	UE^{2}
9	(Philippines) Cian Galsim	UP Fighting Maroons	1	UE^{2}
9	(Philippines) Frank Labayen	De La Salle Green Archers	1	Adamson^{2}

Note

^{1} Round 1
^{2} Round 2

== Women's tournament ==
=== Elimination round ===
==== Team standings ====
Pos	Team	Pld	W	D	L	GF	GA	GD	Pts	Qualification
1	FEU Lady Tamaraws	10	9	0	1	32	6	+26	27	Twice-to-beat in the semifinals
2	De La Salle Lady Booters	10	7	1	2	15	5	+10	22	Twice-to-beat in the semifinals
3	UP Fighting Maroons (H)	10	5	0	5	13	14	−1	15	Twice-to-win in the semifinals
4	Ateneo Blue Eagles	10	4	1	5	14	15	−1	13	Twice-to-win in the semifinals
5	UST Lady Booters	10	3	2	5	13	13	0	11	
6	NU Lady Bulldogs	10	0	0	10	0	34	−34	0	

Source: The UAAP
(H) Hosts

==== Match-up results ====
	Round 1					Round 2				
Team ╲ Game	1	2	3	4	5	6	7	8	9	10
Ateneo Blue Eagles	UST school colors	La Salle school colors	UP school colors	FEU school colors	NU school colors	UP school colors	La Salle school colors	UST school colors	FEU school colors	NU school colors
De La Salle Lady Booters	UP school colors	Ateneo school colors	NU school colors	UST school colors	FEU school colors	UST school colors	Ateneo school colors	NU school colors	UP school colors	FEU school colors
FEU Lady Tamaraws	NU school colors	UP school colors	UST school colors	Ateneo school colors	La Salle school colors	NU school colors	UST school colors	UP school colors	Ateneo school colors	La Salle school colors
NU Lady Bulldogs	FEU school colors	UST school colors	La Salle school colors	UP school colors	Ateneo school colors	FEU school colors	UP school colors	La Salle school colors	UST school colors	Ateneo school colors
UP Fighting Maroons	La Salle school colors	FEU school colors	Ateneo school colors	NU school colors	UST school colors	Ateneo school colors	NU school colors	FEU school colors	La Salle school colors	UST school colors
UST Growling Tigresses	Ateneo school colors	NU school colors	FEU school colors	La Salle school colors	UP school colors	La Salle school colors	FEU school colors	Ateneo school colors	NU school colors	UP school colors

Source: The UAAP
= Win; = Draw; = Loss

==== Results ====
School	ATENEO	DLSU	FEU	NU	UP	UST
Ateneo Blue Eagles		0–3	2–3	4–0	2–1	1–0
De La Salle Lady Booters	1–0		0–1	2–0	1–0	3–2
FEU Lady Tamaraws	4–1	0–1		5–0	4–0	1–0
NU Lady Bulldogs	0–2	0–3	0–5		0–5	0–3
UP Fighting Maroons	2–1	1–0	1–4	2–0		1–0
UST Lady Booters	1–1	1–1	1–5	3–0	2–0	

Source: The UAAP
Legend: Blue = left column team win; Yellow = draw; Red = top row team win.

=== Playoffs Bracket ===
Semifinals (Top 2 twice-to-beat)
1	FEU	5
4	Ateneo	1
2	La Salle	0 (3)
3	UP	0 (2)

Final (Knockout)
1	FEU	1
2	La Salle	0

*If necessary

=== Semifinals ===
This will be the first season to feature a final four in the Women's Division of the tournament. The top two seeds have the twice-to-beat advantage where they have to win just once, while their opponents twice, to progress. FEU Lady Tamaraw Booters had a chance to sweep the elimination round and advance straight to the finals in a first-ever uaap women's football stepladder format, but was ultimately upended by De La Salle Lady Booters on the final day of the eliminations.

==== (1) FEU vs. (4) Ateneo ====
November 6, 2026
16:30

FEU Lady Tamaraws	5–1	Ateneo Blue Eagles
Arevalo 45+1', 51'; Trinidad 58', 68', 88'		Bicierro 90+2'

Rizal Memorial Stadium, Manila

==== (2) La Salle vs. (3) UP ====
November 6, 2026
19:00

De La Salle Lady Archers	0–0 (a.e.t.)	UP Fighting Maroons
Penalties
Regarde (penalty missed); Valencia (penalty scored); Dañoso (penalty missed); Buebos (penalty missed); Lubiano (penalty scored); Banzon (penalty scored)	3–2	Rivas (penalty missed); Espinosa (penalty missed); Aranas (penalty scored); Facturanan (penalty missed); Muros (penalty scored); Arrojado (penalty missed)

Rizal Memorial Stadium, Manila

=== Finals ===
FEU Lady Tamaraw Booters and De La Salle Lady Booters won their respective semifinal series in a single game, setting up their sixth consecutive finals meeting. The FEU Lady Tamaraw Booters aim to secure an unprecedented five-peat. The finals is a knockout single-game elimination.

November 13, 2026
17:00

FEU Tamaraws	1–0	De La Salle Green Archers

Rizal Memorial Stadium, Manila

=== Statistics ===
As of 6 November 2026

==== Top goalscorers ====
Team eliminated / inactive for this round.

Rank	Player	Team	Round 1					Round 2					SF	F	Total
Rank	Player	Team	M1	M2	M3	M4	M5	M6	M7	M8	M9	M10	SF	F	Total
1	(Philippines) Judie Arevalo	FEU Tamaraws		2		2		1	1	1	1	2			8
2	(Philippines) Erissa Rivas	UP Fighting Maroons			1	2	1			1					5
2	(Philippines) Jada Bicierro	Ateneo Blue Eagles	1			1	1				1				5
3	(Philippines) Jessa Mae Aranas	UP Fighting Maroons				2		1	1						4
3	(Philippines) Jelan Pabuaya	FEU Tamaraws					1		1	2					4
3	(Philippines) Julia Sacmar	FEU Tamaraws	1	1	1						1				4
3	(Philippines) Tiffany Trinidad	FEU Tamaraws						1							4
7	(Philippines) Lara Angela Regarde	De La Salle Green Archers	1	1		1									3
7	(Philippines) Kyaneza Abellar	FEU Tamaraws	1			1				1					3
7	(Philippines) Dani Tanjangco	De La Salle Green Archers		1					1	1					3
7	(Philippines) Iries Dela Cruz	FEU Tamaraws		1					1		1				3
7	(Philippines) Maria Rica Juliana Gerona	UST Growling Tigers				1			1		1				3

==== Own goals ====
Rank	Player	School	Against	Own goals
1				

==== Top assists ====
Rank	Player	School	Assists
1	(Philippines) Marienell Cristobal	FEU Tamaraws	5
1	(Philippines) Sarahgen Tulabing	FEU Tamaraws	5
3	(Philippines) Althea Rebosura	FEU Tamaraws	4
3	(Philippines) Jelan Pabuaya	FEU Tamaraws	4
5	(Philippines) Dani Tanjangco	De La Salle Green Archers	3

==== Clean sheets ====
Rank	Player	School	Matches
1	(Philippines) Jessica Marie Pido	De La Salle Green Archers	7
2	(Philippines) Blaine Marie Barredo	FEU Tamaraws	4
2	(Philippines) Ainnah Miel De Guzman	UP Fighting Maroons	4
4	(Philippines) Lizlie Garcia	UST Growling Tigers	2
4	(Philippines) Sophia Gajitos	Ateneo Blue Eagles	2
6	(Philippines) Brielle Olivia Baca	Ateneo Blue Eagles	1
6	(Philippines) Mikah Ranain	FEU Tamaraws	1
6	(Philippines) Mariel Sancho	UP Fighting Maroons	1
6	(Philippines) Ilah Maries Adolfo	UST Growling Tigers	1

==== Player of the Match ====
Rank	Player	School	Matches	Against
1	(Philippines) Judie Arevalo	FEU Tamaraws	2	UP^{1}, Ateneo^{1}
1	(Philippines) Althea Rebosura	FEU Tamaraws	2	NU^{1}, UST^{2}
1	(Philippines) Maegan Alforque	De La Salle Lady Booters	2	Ateneo^{2}, NU^{2}
1	(Philippines) Jelan Pabuaya	FEU Tamaraws	2	La Salle^{1}, UP^{2}
5	(Philippines) Lara Angela Regarde	De La Salle Lady Booters	1	UP^{1}
5	(Philippines) Jada Bicierro	Ateneo Blue Eagles	1	UST^{1}
5	(Philippines) Maria Rica Julana Gerona	UST Growling Tigers	1	NU^{1}
5	(Philippines) Ushin Joi Valencia	De La Salle Lady Booters	1	Ateneo^{1}
5	(Philippines) Chenny Mae Dañoso	De La Salle Lady Booters	1	NU^{1}
5	(Philippines) Soleil Saskia Schroth	Ateneo Blue Eagles	1	UP^{1}
5	(Philippines) Julia Sacmar	FEU Tamaraws	1	UST^{1}
5	(Philippines) Jodi Marie Banzon	De La Salle Green Archers	1	UST^{1}
5	(Philippines) Erissa Rivas	UP Fighting Maroons	1	NU^{1}
5	(Philippines) Rajah Garrido	UP Fighting Maroons	1	UST^{1}
5	(Philippines) Sophia Lyttle	Ateneo Blue Eagles	1	NU^{1}
5	(Philippines) Jannah Marie Santerva	UST Growling Tigers	1	La Salle^{2}
5	(Philippines) Ainnah De Guzman	UP Fighting Maroons	1	Ateneo^{2}
5	(Philippines) Sarahgen Tulabing	FEU Tamaraws	1	NU^{2}
5	(Philippines) Aurea Reaso	UP Fighting Maroons	1	NU^{2}
5	(Philippines) Rae Mikella Tolentino	Ateneo Blue Eagles	1	UST^{2}
5	(Philippines) Iries Dela Cruz	FEU Tamaraws	1	Ateneo^{2}
5	(Philippines) Hannah Muros	UP Fighting Maroons	1	La Salle^{2}
5	(Philippines) Rojana Nemenzo	UST Growling Tigers	1	NU^{2}
5	(Philippines) Rodina Martinez	UST Growling Tigers	1	UP^{2}
5	(Philippines) Sophia Gajitos	Ateneo Blue Eagles	1	NU^{2}
5	(Philippines) Elisha Lubiano	De La Salle Lady Booters	1	FEU^{2}
5	(Philippines) Tiffany Trinidad	FEU Tamaraws	1	Ateneo^{SF}
5	(Philippines) Jessica Pido	De La Salle Lady Booters	1	UP^{SF}

== See also ==
- UAAP Season 89
