= Lia Cruz =

Filipino host and sports anchor (born 1985)

- Born: July 13, 1985 (age 40)
- Education: Ateneo de Manila University
- Years active: 2005–present
- Spouse: Stevie Del Rosario
- Children: 2
- Website: liacruz.com

Lia Cruz is a Filipina television host, news and weather anchor, sportscaster, podcaster, writer and producer based in the Philippines.

== Life and career ==
Lia was born on July 13, 1985, in Manila, Philippines.

She graduated from the Ateneo de Manila University in Manila in 2005, with a degree in AB Communication. She began her TV broadcasting career while still a student here, reporting in the UAAP for ABS-CBN (Studio 23).

She has worked with the World Meteorological Organization on projects to create awareness for climate change. Her video from the Philippines on "Weather in 2050" was released worldwide leading up to the 2014 United Nations Climate Summit in New York City. Lia is also a founding member of the international organization Climate Without Borders, founded in 2017 in Brussels, Belgium.

Lia has been an endorser of Adidas products in the Philippines. She is married and has one child.

=== Television and Radio ===
Lia began her career as she clinched a courtside student-reporting stint in 2005 and 2006 for Ateneo at the University Athletic Association of the Philippines (UAAP) collegiate basketball league on Studio 23. Lia's former TV projects include House of Hoops (ABC 5), Man and Machine (MTV, Studio 23) Auto Extreme (Solar Sports), U-Rock (radio show on NU107), and DJ on Heart 103.5. She grew a following from her stints as the main host for BTV under Solar Sports and as a courtside reporter for the Philippine Basketball Association (PBA).

In 2010, Lia joined the Kapatid Network, TV5, as one of the hosts of morning news show 'Sapul Sa 5.' She became a weather anchor, and a news anchor for late night news, as well as covered major international sporting events such as the 2012 London Olympics, 2016 Rio Olympics, 2014 FIBA World Cup and the Southeast Asian Games.

In 2017, Lia was named as the main presenter of ESPN 5's flagship sports newscast, SportsCenter Philippines, along with fellow Sports5/ESPN5 presenters Aaron Atayde, Magoo Marjon and Amanda Fernandez. It was the local version of SportsCenter following TV5's partnership with global sports network ESPN. For this, she and Atayde received training in ESPN headquarters in Bristol, Connecticut in the United States.

=== Writing ===
When she was a teen, Lia started writing for Candy Magazine, a magazine for teenage girls published by Summit Media. She was part of the very first Candy Council of Cool, and went on to write for other magazines and publications.

She wrote a short story, "claire'sworld.com," for Summit Books' young adult anthology "Coming of Age."

She is currently a contributor for the lifestyle section of the Philippine Daily Inquirer.

=== Podcasting ===
In 2021, Lia launched What Glass Ceiling?, a podcast about inspiring women and their struggles, together with Stef Orandain-Virata and Trypod Network.

== TV shows ==
- ABS-CBN coverage of the UAAP (2005-2006) - courtside reporter
- Solar Sports coverage of the PBL (2008, 2005-2007, 2009-2010)
- Auto Extreme (2007)
- House Of Hoops (2008)
- Man and Machine (2008-2009)
- PBA on TV5 (2007-2008) - courtside reporter
- PBA on Solar Sports (2009-2010) - courtside reporter
- Sapul sa Singko (2010-2012) - host
- Tech Trip (2010–2012) - host
- Aksyon News Alerts (2011-2017)
- Pilipinas News (2012-2014) - Aksyon Weather anchor
- Aksyon Tonite (2014 - 2017) - news anchor
- SportsCenter Philippines (2017–2020) - lead anchor and presenter, correspondent

== Radio ==
- Heart 103.5 (as a DJ, 2007)
- U-Rock (NU 107, 2005-2010)

== Podcasts ==
- What Glass Ceiling? with Lia Cruz (2021)
