= Aaron Atayde =

Filipino host and sports anchor

- Born: Aaron Joshua Atayde; Glendale, California
- Other name: Josh Strike
- Education: De La Salle University
- Occupations: DJ, Sportscaster, TV Host
- Years active: 2007–present

Aaron Joshua "Josh Strike" Atayde is a DJ, TV host, and sports anchor for ABS-CBN coverage of the UAAP. He is now sports anchor for UFL on AKTV and doing courtside reportage for PBA.

== Life and career ==
Atayde is a son of Tony Atayde Sr., former La Salle track and field and basketball player.

Atayde is a graduate of AB Communication Arts in De La Salle University. He started his career as a courtside reporter for UAAP Seasons 70 and 71 for Adamson University Soaring Falcons. After serving for 2 years, he went-on to be part of the play-by-play panel since 2009.

He hosts the Quick-E technology show for Studio 23.

Atayde started out as one of the Junior Jocks of Magic 89.9 radio for the year 2007. He uses the moniker, "Josh Strike".

He has done courtside reporting for PBA on AKTV and being the main presenter of UFL.

He was also one of the host for "SLAMRadioPH", A weekly podcast about the PBA in slamonlineph.com.

== Filmography ==
=== TV ===
- Wildcard (2008–2010; Studio 23)
- Quick-E (2009–2010; Studio 23)
- Pa-Bida Ka! (2010–2011; Studio 23)
- PBA on AKTV (2011–2013; IBC)
- UFL (2011–2013; IBC)
- NCAA on Sports5 (2012–2014; IBC/AksyonTV)
- PBA Money Ball: Dribol of Da Pipol (2014; TV5/AksyonTV)
- PBA on Sports5 (2013–2014; TV5/AksyonTV) as commentator
- Sports 360 (2015–2016; TV5) as co-host
- Rio Olympics Special Coverage on TV5 (2016; TV5)
- SportsCenter Philippines (2017–2020; TV5) as Sports news anchor
- Geeks and Gamers Guide (2020–2022; One Sports)

== Radio ==
- The Strike Zone (2007–2014; Magic 89.9)
- Top 5 @ 5 (2015–2017; Magic 89.9)
- The Rundown (2015–2018; Magic 89.9)
- Magic 30 (2008–2011; Magic 89.9)

== See also ==
- ABS-CBN Sports
- Sports5
