= NCAA Season 102 =

2026–27 Philippine collegiate athletic season

- Strive. Believe. Unite. One League. One Community. One Pride.
- Host school: San Beda University

Seniors' champions
Sport		Men	Women
Basketball		TBA	NT
Swimming		San Beda	San Beda
Taekwondo		San Beda	Benilde

Juniors' champions
Sport		Boys	Girls
Basketball		TBA	NT
Swimming		LSGH	NT
- (NT) = No tournament; (DS) = Demonstration Sport; (Ex) = Exhibition;

NCAA Season 102 is the 102nd season of the National Collegiate Athletic Association (NCAA) of the Philippines. Held during the 2026–27 academic year, the season shall be hosted by San Beda University. The opening ceremony was held on September 13, 2026, at the SM Mall of Asia Arena. and the theme is "Strive. Believe. Unite."

== Background ==
=== Potential expansion ===
In his column, Joaquin Henson wrote that four schools: Centro Escolar University, Our Lady of Fatima University, Philippine Christian University and San Beda College Alabang, are seeking to join the NCAA.

=== Broadcasting ===
GMA Network did not renew its TV deal with the NCAA, with its final airing being the women's finals of the NCAA Season 101 volleyball tournaments. Early contenders for their replacement were the Bilyonaryo News Channel and ABS-CBN, with Net 25 and state-run People's Television Network also expressing interest. With the draw of groupings in the NCAA Season 102 basketball tournaments, it was revealed that Bilyonaryo News Channel, Solar Sports, and an unnamed production company, made presentations to the NCAA. Cignal TV and ABS-CBN informed the league that they will also submit their bids. Bilyonaryo submitted its letter of intent on June 9, while Cignal TV submitted its letter of intent on June 20.

On July 15, 2026, the NCAA signed a two-season deal with Cignal TV at the Ramon Cojuangco Building, with their games airing on RPTV, NCAA NXT and One Sports.

== Sports calendar ==
Sport	Tournament(s)			Host	Duration	Venue(s)	Ref
Sport	M	W	J	Host	Duration	Venue(s)	Ref
Basketball	check	—N/a	check	San Beda	September 13, 2026–present	SM Mall of Asia Arena, Filoil EcoOil Centre, PhilSports Arena, San Andres Sports Complex	
Swimming	check	check	check	Mapúa	November 9–13, 2026	Rizal Memorial Sports Complex	

== Basketball ==
The NCAA basketball championships started on September 13, 2026, and is currently ongoing.

=== Group stage ===
==== Group A ====
Pos	Team	W	L	PCT	GB	Qualification
1	San Beda Red Lions (H)	10	3	.769 (Note: Head-to-head record: San Beda 2–0 JRU)	—	Twice-to-beat in the quarterfinals
2	JRU Heavy Bombers	10	3	.769	—	Twice-to-beat in the quarterfinals
3	Benilde Blazers	8	5	.615	2	Twice-to-win in the quarterfinals
4	Mapúa Cardinals	7	6	.538	3	Twice-to-beat in play-in round
5	Lyceum Pirates	4	9	.308	6	Twice-to-win in play-in round

Source: GMA News
(H) Hosts

==== Group B ====
Pos	Team	W	L	PCT	GB	Qualification
1	Letran Knights	9	4	.692	—	Twice-to-beat in the quarterfinals
2	EAC Generals	7	6	.538	2	Twice-to-beat in the quarterfinals
3	Arellano Chiefs	6	7	.462	3	Twice-to-win in the quarterfinals
4	Perpetual Altas	4	9	.308	5	Twice-to-beat in play-in round
5	San Sebastian Stags	0	13	.000	9	Twice-to-win in play-in round

Source: GMA News

==== Playoffs ====
Play-in round (No. 4 twice-to-beat)
B4	Perpetual	79
B5	San Sebastian	73
A4	Mapúa	83
A5	Lyceum	68

Quarterfinals (Top 2 twice-to-beat)
A1	San Beda	73
B4	Perpetual	71
B2	EAC	88
A3	Benilde	64
B1	Letran	86
A4	Mapúa	75
A2	JRU	81
B3	Arellano	70

Semifinals (Best-of-three playoff)
A1	San Beda	^
B2	EAC	^
B1	Letran	^
A2	JRU	^

Finals (Best-of-three playoff)
^
^
Third place playoff

^If necessary

=== Juniors' tournament ===
==== Group stage ====
===== Group A =====
Pos	Team	W	L	PCT	GB	Qualification
1	JRU Light Bombers	10	3	.769	—	Twice-to-beat in the quarterfinals
2	La Salle Green Hills Greenies	9	4	.692	1	Twice-to-beat in the quarterfinals
3	Mapúa Red Robins	8	5	.615	2	Twice-to-win in the quarterfinals
4	San Beda Red Cubs (H)	5	8	.385	5	Twice-to-beat in play-in round
5	Lyceum Junior Pirates	0	13	.000	10	Twice-to-win in play-in round

(H) Hosts

===== Group B =====
Pos	Team	W	L	PCT	GB	Qualification
1	Perpetual Junior Altas	10	3	.769	—	Twice-to-beat in the quarterfinals
2	EAC–ICA Brigadiers	8	5	.615	2	Twice-to-beat in the quarterfinals
3	Letran Squires	7	6	.538	3	Twice-to-win in the quarterfinals
4	Arellano Braves	5	8	.385	5	Twice-to-beat in play-in round
5	San Sebastian Staglets	3	10	.231	7	Twice-to-win in play-in round

==== Playoffs ====
Play-in round (No. 4 twice-to-beat)
B4	Arellano	82
B5	San Sebastian	77
A4	San Beda	67	68
A5	Lyceum	68	49

Quarterfinals (Top 2 twice-to-beat)
A1	JRU	96*
B4	Arellano	93
B2	EAC	72
A3	Mapúa	66
B1	Perpetual	93
A4	San Beda	71
A2	LSGH	93
B3	Letran	75

Semifinals (Best-of-three playoff)
A1	JRU	^
B2	EAC	^
B1	Perpetual	^
A2	LSGH	^

Finals (Best-of-three playoff)
^
^
Third place playoff

*Overtime
^If necessary

== Swimming ==
The NCAA swimming championships were held at the Teofilo Yldefonso Swimming Pool of the Rizal Memorial Sports Complex in Manila, from November 9 to 13, 2026.

=== Men's tournament ===
Pos	Team	Points
1st place, gold medalist(s)	San Beda University	1411.25
2nd place, silver medalist(s)	De La Salle–College of Saint Benilde	973.50
3rd place, bronze medalist(s)	University of Perpetual Help System DALTA	242.50
4	San Sebastian College–Recoletos	203.75
5	Colegio de San Juan de Letran	169.00
6	Arellano University	132.50
7	Mapúa University	113.50
8	Emilio Aguinaldo College	52.00
9	Lyceum of the Philippines University	9.00
10	José Rizal University	8.00

=== Women's tournament ===
Pos	Team	Points
1st place, gold medalist(s)	San Beda University	1402.00
2nd place, silver medalist(s)	De La Salle–College of Saint Benilde	850.50
3rd place, bronze medalist(s)	University of Perpetual Help System DALTA	433.50
4	Emilio Aguinaldo College	252.00
5	Colegio de San Juan de Letran	118.50
6	San Sebastian College–Recoletos	113.75
7	Arellano University	41.75
8	Mapúa University	26.00
9	José Rizal University	—
10	Lyceum of the Philippines University	2.00

=== Juniors' tournament ===
Pos	Team	Points
1st place, gold medalist(s)	La Salle Green Hills	1139.00
2nd place, silver medalist(s)	San Beda University	619.00
3rd place, bronze medalist(s)	Colegio de San Juan de Letran	417.00
4	Emilio Aguinaldo College	363.25
5	Lyceum of the Philippines University	274.75
6	San Sebastian College–Recoletos	161.75
7	University of Perpetual Help System DALTA	139.50
8	Arellano University	88.00
9	Mapúa University	73.75
10	José Rizal University	14.00

== General championship summary ==
=== Medal tables ===
==== Seniors' division ====
Rank	Team	Gold	Silver	Bronze	Total
1	San Beda University*	3	1	0	4
2	De La Salle–College of Saint Benilde	1	3	0	4
3	University of Perpetual Help System DALTA	0	0	2	2
4	Arellano University	0	0	0	0
4	Colegio de San Juan de Letran	0	0	0	0
4	Emilio Aguinaldo College	0	0	0	0
4	José Rizal University	0	0	0	0
4	Lyceum of the Philippines University	0	0	0	0
4	Mapúa University	0	0	0	0
4	San Sebastian College–Recoletos	0	0	0	0
Totals (10 entries)		4	4	2	10

* Host nation (Season host); Leads the general championship tally
Notes: Season in progress. Results are not yet final.

==== Juniors' division ====
Rank	Team	Gold	Silver	Bronze	Total
1	La Salle Green Hills	1	0	0	1
2	San Beda University–Rizal*	0	1	0	1
3	Colegio de San Juan de Letran	0	0	1	1
4	Arellano University	0	0	0	0
4	EAC–Immaculate Conception Academy	0	0	0	0
4	José Rizal University	0	0	0	0
4	Lyceum of the Philippines University–Cavite	0	0	0	0
4	Malayan High School of Science	0	0	0	0
4	San Sebastian College–Recoletos	0	0	0	0
4	University of Perpetual Help System DALTA	0	0	0	0
Totals (10 entries)		1	1	1	3

* Host nation (Season host); Leads the general championship tally
Notes: Season in progress. Results are not yet final.

=== General championship tally ===
==== Seniors' division ====
		Swimming		Taekwondo		Total		
Rank	Team	M	W	M	W	M	W	Overall
1	San Beda (H)	50	50	50	40	100	90	190
2	Benilde	40	40	40	50	80	90	170
3	Perpetual	35	35	—	—	35	35	70
4	Letran	25	25	—	—	25	25	50
4	San Sebastian	30	20	—	—	30	20	50
6	EAC	10	30	—	—	10	30	40
7	Arellano	20	15	—	—	20	15	35
8	Mapúa	15	10	—	—	15	10	25
9	Lyceum	8	8	—	—	8	8	16
10	JRU	6	6	—	—	6	6	12

(H) Season host; = Champion; = Runner-up; = Third place; — = No team.
Notes: Season in progress. Results are not yet final.

==== Juniors' division ====
		Swimming	Total
Rank	Team	B	Overall
1	LSGH	50	50
2	SBU–R (H)	40	40
3	Letran	35	35
4	Arellano	—	0
4	Perpetual	—	0
4	EAC–ICA	—	0
4	JRU	—	0
4	LPU–C	—	0
4	Malayan	—	0
4	San Sebastian	—	0

(H) Season host; = Champion; = Runner-up; = Third place; — = No team.
Notes: Season in progress. Results are not yet final.

== See also ==
- UAAP Season 89
