= UAAP Season 89 =

2026–27 Philippine university athletics season

- "For Everyone, UAAP"
- Host school: Far Eastern University

Seniors' champions
| Sport | | Men | Women |
- Basketball
- Volleyball
| Football | | | FEU |
| Baseball | | | NT |
| Softball | | NT | |
- 3x3 basketball
- Athletics
| Badminton | | NU | UP |
- Beach volleyball
- Chess
- Fencing
- Judo
- Swimming
| Table tennis | | UST | FEU |
- Tennis
- Taekwondo
- Golf
- Poomsae: (Coed)
- Esports: (Ex - Coed)
- Cheerdance: NU (Ex - Coed)
- Street dance: (Ex - Coed)

Juniors' champions
| Sport | | Boys | Girls |
- Basketball
- Volleyball
| Football | | | NT |
- 3x3 basketball
- Athletics
- Beach volleyball
- Chess
- Fencing
- Judo
- Swimming
| Table tennis | | UST | UST |
- Tennis
- Taekwondo
| JHS basketball | | | NT |
- Poomsae: (DS - Coed)
- Street dance: (Ex - Coed)
- (NT) = No tournament; (DS) = Demonstration Sport; (Ex) = Exhibition;

UAAP Season 89 is the 2026–27 season of the University Athletic Association of the Philippines (UAAP) hosted by Far Eastern University (FEU), with the theme "For Everyone, UAAP". The opening ceremony was held on September 12, 2026, at the SM Mall of Asia Arena.

== Background ==
=== Deaths of Divine Adili and Rene Baterbonia ===
On June 8, 2026, Ateneo Blue Eagles men's basketball players Divine Adili and Rene Baterbonia's deaths were announced by the Ateneo de Manila University. Ateneo announced that Adili, who had already played in the UAAP, and Baterbonia, a new recruit in the team, drowned in a team building activity off the waters of Dipaculao, Aurora. Two days later, the UAAP issued a statement saying they "will go where the evidence leads" in response to the drownings. More than a week later, the UAAP announced that members of the Ateneo coaching staff that were present in Aurora were barred from joining any UAAP-sanctioned activities.

On August 7, the UAAP announced the perpetual ban on former Ateneo coach Tab Baldwin and certain Ateneo men's basketball staff, but allowed Ateneo's teams to participate.

=== Addition of guest teams ===
The UAAP expanded its guest-school participation in Season 89, welcoming the National Academy of Sports (NAS) and University of the Philippines Cebu (UP Cebu), alongside existing guest schools PAREF Southridge School and Claret School of Quezon City, which first joined the league in Season 87.

NAS became the first guest school to participate in girls' competitions, fielding high school athletes in both boys' and girls' events across five sports: table tennis, athletics, swimming, judo, and taekwondo. The Excel Lions made their UAAP debut in the high school table tennis tournament in November 2026.

UP Cebu also joined the league as a guest participant in the high school boys' football tournament, becoming the first school based outside Luzon to enter the UAAP. Represented by the UP High School Cebu football team, the university is scheduled to make its debut against the University of Santo Tomas on January 13, 2027, expanding the boys' football tournament to eight teams.

== Broadcasting ==
This is the sixth consecutive season of the UAAP's broadcast partnership with Cignal TV and the first under a renewed five-year deal. The network announced the renewal was announced in June 30, 2025, ahead of the previous season, and is set to last through Season 93 in 2030–31.

== Sports calendar ==
=== First semester ===
| Event (Division) | Event Sub-Host | Duration | Venue/s |
|---|---|---|---|
| Opening Ceremony | Far Eastern University | Sep 12, 2026 | SM Mall of Asia Arena |
| Basketball (Collegiate and 16U) | Far Eastern University | Sep 13, 2026 | FEU Diliman Gym; Quadricentennial Pavilion; Adamson Gym; Lucio K. Tan Jr. Gym; Araneta Coliseum; SM Mall of Asia Arena; DLSZ Sports Pavilion; Gameville Central Park; PhilSports Arena; Blue Eagle Gym; Ninoy Aquino Stadium |
| Volleyball (High School) | National University | Sep 19, 2026 | Paco Arena |
| Football (Collegiate) | University of the Philippines | Sep 23, 2026 | UP Diliman Football Stadium |
| Chess (Standard) (Collegiate and High School) | Adamson University | Oct 3, 2026 | UST Buenaventura Garcia Paredes, O.P. Building |
| Badminton (Collegiate) | National University | Oct 17 – Nov 3, 2026 | Gameville Central Park |
| Table Tennis (Collegiate and High School) | University of the Philippines | Nov 8–16, 2026 | Gameville Central Park |

== Basketball ==
=== Men's tournament ===
==== Elimination round ====
| Pos | Team | W | L | PCT | GB | Qualification |
|---|---|---|---|---|---|---|
| 1 | NU Bulldogs (T) | 9 | 3 | .750 (Note: Head-to-head record: NU 1–0 UP) | — | Twice-to-beat in the semifinals |
| 2 | UP Fighting Maroons (T) | 9 | 3 | .750 | — | Twice-to-beat in the semifinals |
| 3 | FEU Tamaraws (H) | 7 | 5 | .583 (Note: Head-to-head record: FEU 1–0 La Salle) | 2 | Twice-to-win in the semifinals |
| 4 | De La Salle Green Archers | 7 | 5 | .583 | 2 | Twice-to-win in the semifinals |
| 5 | UST Growling Tigers | 7 | 6 | .538 | 2.5 | |
| 6 | Adamson Soaring Falcons (E) | 5 | 8 | .385 (Note: Head-to-head record: Adamson 1–1 Ateneo (Adamson +2)) | 4.5 | |
| 7 | Ateneo Blue Eagles (E) | 5 | 8 | .385 | 4.5 | |
| 8 | UE Red Warriors (E) | 1 | 12 | .077 | 8.5 | |

Updated to match(es) played on November 15, 2026. Source: Philippine Daily Inquirer
Rules for classification: 1) winning percentage; 2) if tied for #2 or #4, one-game playoff; 3) head-to-head record; 4) head-to-head point differential; 5) overall point differential:
(E) Eliminated; (H) Hosts; (T) Qualified, but not yet for the particular phase indicated

=== Women's tournament ===
==== Elimination round ====
| Pos | Team | W | L | PCT | GB | Qualification |
|---|---|---|---|---|---|---|
| 1 | UST Growling Tigresses (Z) | 12 | 0 | 1.000 | — | Twice-to-beat in the semifinals |
| 2 | NU Lady Bulldogs | 8 | 4 | .667 | 4 | Twice-to-beat in the semifinals |
| 3 | Adamson Lady Falcons | 8 | 5 | .615 | 4.5 | Twice-to-win in the semifinals |
| 4 | Ateneo Blue Eagles | 6 | 6 | .500 (Note: Head-to-head record: Ateneo 1–0 FEU) | 6 | Twice-to-win in the semifinals |
| 5 | FEU Lady Tamaraws (H) | 6 | 6 | .500 | 6 | |
| 6 | UP Fighting Maroons | 5 | 6 | .455 | 6.5 | |
| 7 | De La Salle Lady Archers (E) | 2 | 10 | .167 | 10 | |
| 8 | UE Lady Warriors (E) | 1 | 11 | .083 | 11 | |

Updated to match(es) played on November 15, 2026. Source: Philippine Daily Inquirer
Rules for classification: 1) winning percentage; 2) if tied for #2 or #4, one-game playoff; 3) head-to-head record; 4) head-to-head point differential; 5) overall point differential:
(E) Eliminated; (H) Hosts; (Z) Clinched twice-to-beat in the semifinals, can still clinch outright finals

=== 16U tournament ===
==== Elimination round ====
| Pos | Team | W | L | PCT | GB | Qualification |
|---|---|---|---|---|---|---|
| 1 | NUNS Bullpups | 14 | 0 | 1.000 | — | Advance to the Finals (Note: As NUNS won all of their elimination round games, the stepladder format was used instead of the regular Final Four format.) |
| 2 | FEU–D Baby Tamaraws (H) | 11 | 3 | .786 | 3 | Advance to stepladder semifinal |
| 3 | Zobel Junior Archers | 9 | 5 | .643 | 5 | Proceed to stepladder quarterfinal |
| 4 | UE Junior Red Warriors | 8 | 6 | .571 | 6 | Proceed to stepladder quarterfinal |
| 5 | UST Tiger Cubs | 7 | 7 | .500 | 7 | |
| 6 | Adamson Baby Falcons | 3 | 11 | .214 | 11 | |
| 7 | Ateneo Blue Eagles | 2 | 12 | .143 (Note: Head-to-head record: Ateneo 1–1 UPIS (Ateneo +17)) | 12 | |
| 8 | UPIS Junior Fighting Maroons | 2 | 12 | .143 | 12 | |

Rules for classification: 1) winning percentage; 2) if tied for #2 or #4, one-game playoff; 3) head-to-head record; 4) head-to-head point differential; 5) overall point differential:
(H) Hosts

== Football ==
=== Men's tournament ===
==== Elimination round ====
| Pos | Team | Pld | W | D | L | GF | GA | GD | Pts | Qualification |
|---|---|---|---|---|---|---|---|---|---|---|
| 1 | De La Salle Green Booters (T) | 10 | 7 | 2 | 1 | 23 | 7 | +16 | 23 | Twice-to-beat in the semifinals |
| 2 | Adamson Soaring Falcons (T) | 10 | 7 | 1 | 2 | 21 | 7 | +14 | 22 | Twice-to-beat in the semifinals |
| 3 | UP Fighting Maroons (H, T) | 10 | 6 | 3 | 1 | 16 | 9 | +7 | 21 | Twice-to-win in the semifinals |
| 4 | UST Golden Booters (T) | 10 | 5 | 2 | 3 | 16 | 8 | +8 | 17 | Twice-to-win in the semifinals |
| 5 | FEU Tamaraws | 10 | 2 | 4 | 4 | 20 | 16 | +4 | 10 | |
| 6 | Ateneo Blue Eagles | 11 | 2 | 2 | 7 | 19 | 20 | −1 | 8 | |
| 7 | UE Red Warriors | 11 | 0 | 0 | 11 | 2 | 50 | −48 | 0 | |

Updated to match(es) played on November 19, 2026. Source: The UAAP
(H) Hosts; (T) Qualified, but not yet for the particular phase indicated

=== Women's tournament ===
==== Elimination round ====
| Pos | Team | Pld | W | D | L | GF | GA | GD | Pts | Qualification |
|---|---|---|---|---|---|---|---|---|---|---|
| 1 | FEU Lady Tamaraws | 10 | 9 | 0 | 1 | 32 | 6 | +26 | 27 | Twice-to-beat in the semifinals |
| 2 | De La Salle Lady Booters | 10 | 7 | 1 | 2 | 15 | 5 | +10 | 22 | Twice-to-beat in the semifinals |
| 3 | UP Fighting Maroons (H) | 10 | 5 | 0 | 5 | 13 | 14 | −1 | 15 | Twice-to-win in the semifinals |
| 4 | Ateneo Blue Eagles | 10 | 4 | 1 | 5 | 14 | 15 | −1 | 13 | Twice-to-win in the semifinals |
| 5 | UST Lady Booters | 10 | 3 | 2 | 5 | 13 | 13 | 0 | 11 | |
| 6 | NU Lady Bulldogs | 10 | 0 | 0 | 10 | 0 | 34 | −34 | 0 | |

Source: The UAAP
(H) Hosts

== Volleyball ==
=== Boys' tournament ===
==== Elimination round ====
| Pos | Team | Pld | W | L | Pts | SW | SL | SR | SPW | SPL | SPR | Qualification |
|---|---|---|---|---|---|---|---|---|---|---|---|---|
| 1 | UST Junior Golden Spikers | 13 | 12 | 1 | 35 | 38 | 8 | 4.750 | 624 | 489 | 1.276 | Advance to the finals |
| 2 | FEU–D Baby Tamaraws | 13 | 12 | 1 | 37 | 38 | 5 | 7.600 | 580 | 450 | 1.289 | Proceed to stepladder round 2 |
| 3 | UE Junior Red Warriors | 13 | 9 | 4 | 27 | 27 | 16 | 1.688 | 499 | 425 | 1.174 | Proceed to stepladder round 1 |
| 4 | NUNS Bullpups (H) | 13 | 9 | 4 | 27 | 32 | 15 | 2.133 | 597 | 501 | 1.192 | Proceed to stepladder round 1 |
| 5 | Adamson Baby Falcons | 13 | 5 | 8 | 15 | 18 | 24 | 0.750 | 485 | 474 | 1.023 | |
| 6 | UPIS Junior Fighting Maroons | 13 | 3 | 10 | 8 | 10 | 32 | 0.313 | 514 | 590 | 0.871 | |
| 7 | Zobel Junior Archers | 13 | 2 | 11 | 7 | 9 | 33 | 0.273 | 439 | 529 | 0.830 | |
| 8 | Ateneo Blue Eagles | 13 | 0 | 13 | 0 | 0 | 39 | 0.000 | 302 | 600 | 0.503 | |

Updated to match(es) played on October 20, 2026. Source: UAAP Volleyball on Livestats
Rules for classification: 1) number of wins; 2) if tied for No. 2 or 4, one-game playoff; 3) match points; 4) sets ratio; 5) points ratio; 6) head-to-head record
(H) Host

=== Girls' tournament ===
==== Elimination round ====
| Pos | Team | Pld | W | L | Pts | SW | SL | SR | SPW | SPL | SPR | Qualification |
|---|---|---|---|---|---|---|---|---|---|---|---|---|
| 1 | NUNS Lady Bullpups (H) | 13 | 13 | 0 | 39 | 39 | 2 | 19.500 | 554 | 316 | 1.753 | Advance to the finals |
| 2 | UST Junior Tigresses | 13 | 11 | 2 | 33 | 34 | 8 | 4.250 | 521 | 378 | 1.378 | Proceed to stepladder round 2 |
| 3 | Adamson Lady Baby Falcons | 13 | 9 | 4 | 27 | 30 | 13 | 2.308 | 557 | 484 | 1.151 | Proceed to stepladder round 1 |
| 4 | FEU–D Lady Baby Tamaraws | 13 | 9 | 4 | 27 | 29 | 13 | 2.231 | 503 | 438 | 1.148 | Proceed to stepladder round 1 |
| 5 | Zobel Junior Lady Archers | 13 | 5 | 8 | 15 | 15 | 25 | 0.600 | 439 | 480 | 0.915 | |
| 6 | Ateneo Blue Eagles | 13 | 4 | 9 | 12 | 12 | 30 | 0.400 | 446 | 537 | 0.831 | |
| 7 | UPIS Junior Lady Maroons | 13 | 1 | 12 | 3 | 4 | 37 | 0.108 | 402 | 548 | 0.734 | |
| 8 | UE Junior Lady Warriors | 13 | 0 | 13 | 0 | 4 | 39 | 0.103 | 352 | 589 | 0.598 | |

Updated to match(es) played on October 16, 2026. Source: UAAP Volleyball on Livestats
Rules for classification: 1) number of wins; 2) if tied for No. 2 or 4, one-game playoff; 3) match points; 4) sets ratio; 5) points ratio; 6) head-to-head record
(H) Host

== Table tennis ==
The UAAP table tennis championships began on November 8, 2026 at the Gameville Central Park.

=== Team event ===
==== Men's tournament ====
===== Elimination round =====
| Pos | Team | Pld | W | L | Qualification |
|---|---|---|---|---|---|
| 1 | UST Tiger Paddlers | 6 | 6 | 0 | Advance to the semifinals |
| 2 | Ateneo Blue Eagles | 6 | 5 | 1 | Advance to the semifinals |
| 3 | UP Fighting Maroons (H) | 6 | 3 | 3 | Advance to the semifinals |
| 4 | De La Salle Green Paddlers | 6 | 3 | 3 | Advance to the semifinals |
| 5 | Adamson Soaring Falcons | 6 | 2 | 4 | |
| 6 | FEU Tamaraws | 6 | 2 | 4 | |
| 7 | UE Red Warriors | 6 | 0 | 6 | |

Source: UAAP Livestats
Rules for classification: 1) winning percentage; 2) if tied for #2 or #4, one-game playoff; 3) head-to-head record; 4) head-to-head point differential; 5) overall point differential
(H) Hosts

===== Playoffs =====
Semifinals
1 | UST | 3
4 | La Salle | 0
2 | Ateneo | 2
3 | UP | 3

Finals
1 | UST | 3
3 | UP | 0
Third place
4 | La Salle | 1
2 | Ateneo | 3

==== Women's tournament ====
===== Elimination round =====
| Pos | Team | Pld | W | L | Qualification |
|---|---|---|---|---|---|
| 1 | FEU Lady Tamaraws | 6 | 6 | 0 | Advance to the semifinals |
| 2 | UST Lady Paddlers | 6 | 5 | 1 | Advance to the semifinals |
| 3 | De La Salle Lady Paddlers | 6 | 4 | 2 | Advance to the semifinals |
| 4 | UP Fighting Maroons (H) | 6 | 3 | 3 | Advance to the semifinals |
| 5 | Ateneo Blue Eagles | 6 | 2 | 4 | |
| 6 | UE Lady Warriors | 6 | 1 | 5 | |
| 7 | Adamson Lady Falcons | 6 | 0 | 6 | |

Source: UAAP Livestats
Rules for classification: 1) winning percentage; 2) if tied for #2 or #4, one-game playoff; 3) head-to-head record; 4) head-to-head point differential; 5) overall point differential
(H) Hosts

===== Playoffs =====
Semifinals
1 | FEU | 3
4 | UP | 0
2 | UST | 3
3 | La Salle | 1

Finals
1 | FEU | 3
2 | UST | 1
Third place
4 | UP | 0
3 | La Salle | 3

==== Boys' tournament ====
===== Elimination round =====
| Pos | Team | Pld | W | L | Qualification |
|---|---|---|---|---|---|
| 1 | UST Junior Tiger Paddlers | 6 | 6 | 0 | Advance to the semifinals |
| 2 | NAS Excel Lions | 6 | 5 | 1 | Advance to the semifinals |
| 3 | UE Junior Red Warriors | 6 | 4 | 2 | Advance to the semifinals |
| 4 | Adamson Baby Falcons | 6 | 3 | 3 | Advance to the semifinals |
| 5 | DLSZ Junior Green Paddlers | 6 | 2 | 4 | |
| 6 | Ateneo Blue Eagles | 6 | 1 | 5 | |
| 7 | UPIS Junior Fighting Maroons (H) | 6 | 0 | 6 | |

Source: UAAP Livestats
Rules for classification: 1) winning percentage; 2) if tied for #2 or #4, one-game playoff; 3) head-to-head record; 4) head-to-head point differential; 5) overall point differential
(H) Hosts

===== Playoffs =====
Semifinals
1 | UST | 3
4 | Adamson | 1
2 | NAS | 3
3 | UE | 0

Finals
1 | UST | 3
2 | NAS | 0
Third place
4 | Adamson | 1
3 | UE | 3

==== Girls' tournament ====
===== Elimination round =====
| Pos | Team | Pld | W | L | Qualification |
|---|---|---|---|---|---|
| 1 | NAS Excel Lions | 6 | 6 | 0 | Advance to the semifinals |
| 2 | UST Junior Lady Paddlers | 6 | 5 | 1 | Advance to the semifinals |
| 3 | DLSZ Junior Lady Paddlers | 6 | 3 | 3 | Advance to the semifinals |
| 4 | UE Junior Lady Warriors | 6 | 3 | 3 | Advance to the semifinals |
| 5 | UP Fighting Maroons (H) | 6 | 2 | 4 | |
| 6 | Ateneo Blue Eagles | 6 | 1 | 5 | |
| 7 | Adamson Lady Baby Falcons | 6 | 1 | 5 | |

Source: UAAP Livestats
Rules for classification: 1) winning percentage; 2) if tied for #2 or #4, one-game playoff; 3) head-to-head record; 4) head-to-head point differential; 5) overall point differential
(H) Hosts

===== Playoffs =====
Semifinals
1 | NAS | 3
4 | UE | 1
2 | UST | 3
3 | DLSZ | 2

Finals
1 | NAS | 3
2 | UST | 0
Third place
4 | UE | 3
3 | La Salle | 2

=== Doubles event ===
==== Men's tournament ====
Quarterfinals
R Marcelino; A Antivo | 3
S Abirin; L Fresco | 1
J Noriega Jr; R Torres | 3
B Florida; E Tolentino | 0
J Rama; C Golez | 0
R Manlapaz; D Atilano | 3
J Del Rosario; R Digamon | 1
C Docto; Z Fresco | 3

Semifinals
R Marcelino; A Antivo
J Noriega Jr; R Torres
R Manlapaz; D Atilano
C Docto; Z Fresco

Finals

==== Women's tournament ====
Quarterfinals
B Sadora; F Obaña | 1
C Sarmiento; K Reyes | 3
C Golez; S Gabisay | 3
K Lozada; M A Gumobao | 0
J Montecarlo; A Deondo | 0
T Alarcon; K Encarnacion | 3
J Paculba; K Encarnacion | 1
A Fabregar; A Solis | 3

Semifinals
C Sarmiento; K Reyes
C Golez; S Gabisay
T Alarcon; K Encarnacion
A Fabregar; A Solis

Finals

==== Boys' tournament ====
Quarterfinals
K Redor; P Agunod | 3
J Fresco; L Morales | 1
N Enoza; M Santiago | 3
E Elazegui; A Fresco | 2
J Bañas; R Canalin | 3
J Moral; L Oblina | 0
P Mangundayao; J Manucduc | 1
T Anceno; E Vicente | 3

Semifinals
K Redor; P Agunod
N Enoza; M Santiago
J Bañas; R Canalin
T Anceno; E Vicente

Finals

==== Girls' tournament ====
Quarterfinals
J Bandojo; L Manay | 3
R De Pedro; R Depiedra | 0
K Cac; S Puentespina | 3
M Villacruel; L Clanor | 1
O Ducanes; A Acuzar | 3
C Davo; N Baholoy | 0
M Diolola; A Buquid | 3
L Perez; A Lopez | 0

Semifinals
J Bandojo; L Manay
K Cac; S Puentespina
O Ducanes; A Acuzar
M Diolola; A Buquid

Finals

=== Singles event ===
==== Men's tournament ====
Quarterfinals
M Cabrido | 3
S Llemit | 0
J Datahan | 1
K Piala | 3
A Samadsad | 1
R Reg | 3
E Tormis | 3
A Aroma | 2

Semifinals
M Cabrido
K Piala
R Reg
E Tormis

Finals

==== Women's tournament ====
Quarterfinals
A Gudes | 3
L Ebora | 0
C Santillan | 0
M Tanate | 3
M Dinauanao | 3
N Romero | 2
A Laude | 3
A Rom | 0

Semifinals
A Gudes
M Tanate
M Dinauanao
A Laude

Finals

==== Boys' tournament ====
Quarterfinals

Semifinals

Finals

==== Girls' tournament ====
Quarterfinals

Semifinals

Finals

== Cheerdance ==
The UAAP Cheerdance Competition was held on November 21, 2026 at the SM Mall of Asia Arena in Pasay City.

The UAAP severed its partnership with the National Cheerleading Championship, taking sole control of the competition for the first time in 12 years.

=== Team standings ===
| Rank | Team | Order | Tumbling | Stunts | Tosses | Pyramids | Dance | Penalties | Points | Percentage |
|---|---|---|---|---|---|---|---|---|---|---|
| 1st place, gold medalist(s) | NU Pep Squad | 7th | 83 | 90 | 76.5 | 86 | 359 | -1 | 693.5 | 86.69% |
| 2nd place, silver medalist(s) | UE Pep Squad | 3rd | 75 | 81 | 76 | 83 | 353.5 | -4 | 664.5 | 83.06% |
| 3rd place, bronze medalist(s) | FEU Cheering Squad | 8th | 81.5 | 78.5 | 79 | 82 | 332.5 | -6 | 647.5 | 80.94% |
| 4 | Adamson Pep Squad | 4th | 74.5 | 82.5 | 77.5 | 75 | 328 | -1 | 636.5 | 79.56% |
| 5 | UP Varsity Pep Squad | 2nd | 68.5 | 75 | 64 | 73 | 330 | -14 | 596.5 | 74.56% |
| 6 | DLSU Animo Squad | 5th | 72.5 | 65.5 | 58 | 74 | 309.5 | -14 | 565.5 | 70.69% |
| 7 | UST Salinggawi Dance Troupe | 1st | 69 | 69 | 59 | 64 | 285.5 | -9 | 537.5 | 67.19% |
| 8 | Ateneo Blue Eagles | 6th | 48.5 | 60 | 48 | 67 | 265 | -19 | 469.5 | 58.69% |

== General championship summary ==
The general champion is determined by a point system. The system gives 15 points to the champion team of a UAAP event, 12 to the runner-up, and 10 to the third placer. The following points: 8, 6, 4, 2 and 1 are given to the rest of the participating teams according to their order of finish.

=== Medal tables ===
==== Collegiate division ====
| Rank | Team | Gold | Silver | Bronze | Total |
|---|---|---|---|---|---|
| 1 | Far Eastern University* | 2 | 0 | 0 | 2 |
| 2 | University of Santo Tomas | 1 | 1 | 0 | 2 |
| 3 | University of the Philippines Diliman | 1 | 0 | 2 | 3 |
| 4 | National University | 1 | 0 | 1 | 2 |
| 5 | Ateneo de Manila University | 0 | 3 | 0 | 3 |
| 6 | De La Salle University | 0 | 1 | 2 | 3 |
| 7 | Adamson University | 0 | 0 | 0 | 0 |
| 7 | University of the East | 0 | 0 | 0 | 0 |
| Totals (8 entries) | | 5 | 5 | 5 | 15 |

* Host nation (Season host); General champions
Notes: Results are final.

==== High school division ====
| Rank | Team | Gold | Silver | Bronze | Total |
|---|---|---|---|---|---|
| 1 | University of Santo Tomas | 2 | 0 | 0 | 2 |
| 2 | De La Salle Zobel | 0 | 1 | 0 | 1 |
| 2 | University of the East | 0 | 1 | 0 | 1 |
| 4 | UP Integrated School | 0 | 0 | 1 | 1 |
| 5 | Adamson University | 0 | 0 | 0 | 0 |
| 5 | Ateneo de Manila University | 0 | 0 | 0 | 0 |
| 5 | Far Eastern University–Diliman* | 0 | 0 | 0 | 0 |
| 5 | National University–Nazareth School | 0 | 0 | 0 | 0 |
| Totals (8 entries) | | 2 | 2 | 1 | 5 |

* Host nation (Season host); General champions
Notes: Results are final.

=== General championship tally ===
==== Collegiate division ====
| | | Table tennis | | Badminton | | Football | Total | | |
| Rank | Team | M | W | M | W | W | M | W | Overall |
|---|---|---|---|---|---|---|---|---|---|
| 1 | Ateneo | 12 | 8 | 12 | 12 | 8 | 24 | 28 | 52 |
| 2 | UP | 8 | 6 | 10 | 15 | 10 | 18 | 31 | 49 |
| 3 | UST | 15 | 12 | 6 | 6 | 6 | 21 | 24 | 45 |
| 4 | La Salle | 10 | 10 | 8 | 4 | 12 | 18 | 26 | 44 |
| 5 | FEU (H) | 6 | 15 | — | — | 15 | 6 | 30 | 36 |
| 6 | NU | — | — | 15 | 10 | 4 | 15 | 14 | 29 |
| 7 | Adamson | 4 | 2 | 4 | 8 | — | 8 | 10 | 18 |
| 8 | UE | 2 | 4 | — | — | — | 2 | 4 | 6 |

(H) Season host; = Champion; = Runner-up; = Third place; — = No team.
Notes: Results are final.

==== High School division ====
| | | Table tennis | | Baseball | Total | | |
| Rank | Team | B | G | B | B | G | Overall |
|---|---|---|---|---|---|---|---|
| 1 | UST | 15 | 15 | — | 15 | 15 | 30 |
| 2 | DLSZ | 8 | 12 | — | 8 | 12 | 20 |
| 3 | UE | 12 | 6 | — | 12 | 6 | 18 |
| 4 | UPIS | 4 | 10 | — | 4 | 10 | 14 |
| 5 | Adamson | 6 | 2 | — | 6 | 2 | 8 |
| 6 | Ateneo | 2 | 4 | — | 2 | 4 | 6 |
| 7 | FEU–D (H) | — | — | — | 0 | 0 | 0 |
| 7 | NUNS | — | — | — | 0 | 0 | 0 |

(H) Season host; = Champion; = Runner-up; = Third place; — = No team.
Notes: Results are final.

== See also ==
- NCAA Season 102
