= One Sports =

Philippine sports programming division of TV5

One Sports Sports5 TV5 Sports
- Launched: February 22, 2004 (as ABC Sports); May 5, 2011 (as Sports5 first era); October 12, 2017 (as ESPN5); March 8, 2020 (as One Sports)
- Division of: TV5 Network, Inc.
- Key people: Victorico P. Vargas (President and CEO, TV5 Network, Inc.); Mico Halili (Head, Cignal TV Sports Content)
- Headquarters: TV5 Media Center, Reliance corner Sheridan Streets, Mandaluyong, Metro Manila, Philippines
- Formerly known as: ABC Sports (2004–2008); TV5 Sports (2009–2011); Sports5 (2011–2017, 2023–present); ESPN5 (2017–2020)
- Sister network: TV5; RPTV; One Sports; One Sports+; PBA Rush; NBA TV Philippines; UAAP Varsity Channel; Cignal Play
- Official website: onesports.ph

One Sports (formerly ABC Sports from 2004 to 2008, Sports5 from 2011 to 2017 and ESPN5 from 2017 to 2020) is the sports division of TV5 Network, Inc. and jointly-operated with sister company Cignal TV. One Sports supplies and airs major sporting events in the Philippines and the world for free-to-air TV channels TV5, RPTV, One Sports channel, Cignal-exclusive channels One Sports+, PBA Rush, NBA TV Philippines and UAAP Varsity Channel, and online sports streaming platform Pilipinas Live.

Its flagship program is the Philippine Basketball Association, the world's second oldest professional basketball league, since it acquired the television rights from 2004 to 2008 and since 2011.

== History ==
=== ABC Sports ===
The network's sports division, then known as ABC Sports, was established in 2004 as a result of ABC-5's acquisition of broadcast rights to the Philippine Basketball Association. The telecasts were known as the PBA on ABC, after the disbandment of the broadcasting consortium between NBN-4 and IBC-13. Aside from PBA, ABC Sports also broadcast volleyball games and local boxing bouts, as well as NBA basketball and WWE wrestling matches (in partnership with Solar Entertainment). But after ABC rebranded to TV5 in August 2008, the network still managed to cover the 2008 PBA Fiesta Conference finals, though it is under the auspices of ABC's blocktimer MPB Primedia, Inc. After which, broadcast rights for PBA, NBA, and WWE were then moved to Solar Sports and RPN starting in the 2008–09 season.

=== TV5 Sports ===
In 2009, ABC Sports, still under management of MPB Primedia, was renamed as TV5 Sports in the interim (does not identify as such), in which the network acquired broadcasting rights to the ASEAN Basketball League (the Philippine team in the league, AirAsia Philippine Patriots, was by-then managed by ABC/TV5 owner Antonio "Tonyboy" Cojuangco, Jr.), U.S. boxing matches, and others. In 2010, ABL's broadcasting contract with TV5 expired, after TV5 was acquired by MediaQuest Holdings, and was moved to IBC-13 and later, ABS-CBN Sports and Action.

=== Sports5 ===
In 2011, TV5 and IBC, inked a blocktime deal which subsequently became AKTV. It was launched on May 5, 2011, through a marathon held at the Mall Of Asia Grounds in Pasay.

From then on, Sports5 obtained rights to air major sporting leagues and events like the Philippine Basketball Association United Football League, the NCAA.

Until its flagship primetime sports block's closure on May 31, 2013 due to high blocktime costs and poor ratings, most of its programs are aired on IBC through its programming block AKTV. From June 2013 onwards, most of its sports coverages are shown on TV5, AksyonTV and Hyper. It is headquartered at TV5 Media Center, Reliance cor. Sheridan st., Mandaluyong.

Sports5 is the official TV partner of the Olympic Games in the Philippines from 2014 to 2016. In 2016, Sports5 acquired the Philippine broadcast rights (from ABS-CBN Sports) to air Ultimate Fighting Championship (UFC) on free TV and satellite.

=== ESPN5 ===
On October 12, 2017, TV5 announced that it had reached a partnership with ESPN International to re-brand Sports 5 as ESPN5; the re-branding took effect the next day, coinciding with game 1 of the PBA Governors' Cup final. As part of the relationship, the channel acquired domestic rights to some of ESPN's U.S. and international programming, including classic boxing matches aired on ESPN Classic (also includes some matches from ESPN2's Friday Night Fights), IndyCar Series, the NFL, ESPN Films' documentary series 30 for 30 and Nine for IX, Around the Horn, Pardon the Interruption, U.S. college sports, and the X Games. Although ESPN is a U.S. NBA broadcaster, the league has a separate rights deal with ABS-CBN (under partnership with Solar Sports). The operation includes a local version of ESPN's flagship studio program SportsCenter, SportsCenter Philippines (which premiered on December 17, 2017), and collaboration between ESPN and TV5 on digital content—having launched a localized version of ESPN.com and the streaming ESPN Player service on January 31, 2018. The partnership marked the return of the ESPN brand to the country since the replacement of ESPN Philippines with Fox Sports Asia. Meanwhile, the re-launch as ESPN5 also caused the delays of many of Viva Television's planned productions for TV5 to late 2020 and early 2021 (especially Masked Singer Pilipinas and Kagat ng Dilim).

=== One Sports ===
On March 8, 2020, ESPN5 ceased to exist on television and was rebranded as One Sports (named after the then pay television channel of the same name), as both 5 and the new One Sports channel decided to not carry any ESPN5-branded programming on its schedule. The partnership continued however both on online as the ESPN5 webpage it was active and served as the de facto One Sports homepage in the Philippines and on-air as ESPN programs continue to broadcast on both 5 (later reverted to TV5) and One Sports until October 13, 2021, as the new TV5 Network management will no longer renew a contract with ESPN due to massive negative feedbacks by the fans of the network's entertainment programming against former TV5 Network President and CEO Chot Reyes as well as poor ratings of its sports programming on TV5 and loss of advertisers' support. At the same day, 5 Plus was relaunched as a dedicated channel of One Sports which was moved from being an exclusive-pay television channel to free-to-air and eventually taking over its channel space. Meanwhile, its original pay television counterpart on Cignal was rebranded as One Sports+.

Following the closure of ABS-CBN Sports after 70 congressmen denied ABS-CBN Corporation's new franchise, One Sports replaced certain programming such as the NFL, NCAA (US), with some sports whose rights were previously held by ABS-CBN Sports, such as the NBA, ONE Championship, NCAA Philippines and UAAP.

== Current programs ==
=== RPTV ===
- Philippine Basketball Association (PBA) (2024–present)
- NCAA Philippines (2026–present)

=== One Sports ===
- Asian Tour
- Boxing's Greatest Fights (2022–present)
- European Tour
- Euroleague (2022–present)
- National Cheerleading Championship
- ONE Championship (2022–present)
- Premier Volleyball League (PVL) (2022–present)
- Spikers' Turf
- Starting Lineup (2022–present)
- University Athletic Association of the Philippines (2022–present)

=== One Sports+ ===
- FIBA World Basketball
- FIFA Women's World Cup
- Greatest of all Time
- Starting Lineup (2024–present)
- WWE Bottom Line

=== PBA Rush ===
- Basketball Almanac
- Basketball Science
- Hotseat
- Jumpball (simulcast on One PH and One Sports channel)
- Numbers
- PBA Rulebook
- Shootaround
- Step Back
- Swagg Anatomy
- The Chasedown
- The Huddle (simulcast on One PH and One Sports channel)

=== NBA TV Philippines ===
- NBA Hype
- NBA Spotlight

=== UAAP Varsity Channel ===
- Glory Days
- School Spirit
- Step Up
- The Bounce

=== GG Network ===
- Electronic Sports and Gaming Summit
- Geeks and Gamers Guide
- The Nationals

== Previous programs ==
=== Block ===
- AKTV (2011–2013)

=== Programs ===
- 2005 Southeast Asian Games
- 2007 Southeast Asian Games
- 2019 Southeast Asian Games
- 2011 Philippine Open Pool Championship
- 2012 London Olympic Games Sports Coverage
- 2016 Summer Olympics
- 2020 Summer Olympics
- 2024 Summer Olympics
- 2014 Asian Games
- 2018 Asian Games
- 2022 Asian Games
- 2014 Winter Olympics
- 2018 Winter Olympics
- 2022 Winter Olympics
- 2026 AFC Women's Asian Cup
- 30 for 30 (2018–2021)
- AFC Cup
- AFF Championship
- All Star Professional Wrestling
- Around the Horn (2018–2020)
- ASEAN Basketball League (2009–2010)
- Astig PBA (2007–2008)
- Buhay PBA (2007–2008)
- Badminton Asia Championships (national teams and individuals)
- Filsports Basketball Association (2015–2016)
- Formula E
- High Noon (2018)
- IndyCar Series
- iPBA (2007–2008)
- Maharlika Pilipinas Basketball League (2022–2024; rights now held by Solar Sports)
- MVP Cup
- NCAA (2017–2020; rights now held by ESPN-Disney+ and DAZN)
- NFL (2017–2020, terminated after acquiring ABS-CBN Sports rights; rights now held by TAP Digital Media Ventures Corporation and DAZN)
- Nike Rise
- Pacific Xtreme Combat
- Pardon the Interruption (2018–2020)
- PBA on ABC/TV5 (2004–2008)
- Philippine Super Liga (2015–2020)
- Manny Pacquiao Presents: Blow By Blow
- PBA 3x3
- Philippine Collegiate Champions League
- Ringside (2004–2008)
- Ronda Pilipinas (2015)
- Shakey's V-League (2005–2006)
- Sports 360 (2015–2016)
- SportsPage (2020)
- The Game (2020–2024)
- The Ultimate Fighter
- TNA Impact! (2004–2006)
- Ultimate Fighting Championship (rights now held by ESPN-Disney+)
- UFC Now
- UFC Presents
- UFC Unleashed
- UFC Ultimate Insider
- United Football League
- United Regional Basketball League
- Universities and Colleges Basketball League (2018)
- WWE Raw (1994–2001, 2007–2008, 2009–2010, 2017–2022; rights now held by Netflix)
- WWE SmackDown (2007–2008, 2017–2022; rights now held by Netflix)
- Top Rank Boxing (rights now held by DAZN)

=== Sports5.ph ===
- Speedo G-League

== Sports broadcasters ==
=== Current on-air staff ===
- Anthony Suntay ( NCAA play by play)
- Billie Capistrano (PVL play by play, The Game co-host)
- Migs Gomez ( PVL play-by-play)
- Charlie Cuna (PBA play by play)
- Denisse Valdesancho (NCAA courtside reporter)
- Apple David (PBA courtside reporter)
- Paolo del Rosario ( PBA Rush, PVL Lead play-by-play, Shootaround host, The Game host)
- Richard del Rosario ( PBA Rush Basketball analyst
- Tony Dela Cruz (PBA Basketball analyst)
- Jolly Escobar (PBA Basketball analyst)
- Miguel Dypiangco (PBA Rush, UAAP Basketball, PVL Play by play The Game host)
- Mae Reyes (NCAA courtside reporter)
- Fiona Bacani (NCAA courtside reporter)
- Jaime Ascalon (UAAP Basketball play-by-play, PVL courtside reporter)
- Neil Flores (PVL Volleyball analyst)
- Noreen Go (PVL Volleyball analyst)
- Boom Gonzalez (PVL and UAAP Basketball and Volleyball play-by-play, NBA Hype Host, School Spirit Host, The Game Weekend host)
- Ryan Gregorio (PBA Basketball analyst)
- Eric Altamirano (PBA Basketball analyst)
- Topex Robinson ( PBA Rush Basketball analyst, Jumpball Host)
- Bea Daez-Fabros (UAAP Basketball play-by-play, The Game co-host)
- Mico Halili (Creative Director for sports program and sports digital properties, Cignal TV, Hotseat host, Glory Days Host, UAAP Basketball play-by-play)
- Quinito Henson (PBA Lead Basketball analyst)
- Alexis Tinsay (PVL courtside reporter)
- Raine Ticzon (PVL courtside reporter)
- Sam Corrales (PVL courtside reporter)
- Lexi Rodriguez (PVL courtside reporter)
- Jeanine Tsoi (PVL courtside reporter)
- Frannie Reyes (PVL courtside reporter)
- Kobe Dayao (UAAP Basketball play-by-play)
- Andy Jao (PBA Basketball analyst)
- Bea Escudero ( PBA Rush Courtside reporter, NBA Hype co-host)
- Magoo Marjon (PBA play by play)
- Ronnie Magsanoc (PBA Basketball analyst)
- Danica Jose (UAAP Basketball analyst, NBA Hype co-host)
- Jinno Rufino (PBA Rush,NCAA play by play)
- Nikko Ramos (UAAP Basketball play-by-play)
- Enzo Floro (UAAP Basketball analyst)
- Carlo Pamintuan ( Spikers Turf PBA Rush Basketball analyst, play-by-play, Shootaround host)
- Ali Peek (PBA Rush Basketball analyst)
- Mozzy Ravena (PVL Volleyball analyst)
- Anne Remulla-Canda (PVL Volleyball analyst)
- Ivy Remulla (PVL Volleyball analyst)
- Ayel Estrañero (PVL, Spikers Turf, UAAP Volleyball analyst)
- Dzi Gervacio (PVL Volleyball analyst, The Game co-host)
- Jason Webb (UAAP Basketball analyst)
- Luigi Trillo (UAAP Basketball analyst)
- Eric Tipan (UAAP Basketball and Volleyball, PVL play-by-play)
- Andre Co (PBA Rush Play by play, NCAA play by play)
- Chiqui Reyes (PBA Rush Play-by-play)
- Belle Gregorio (NCAA Courtside reporter)
- Julia Vargas ( PBA Rush Courtside reporter)
- Eric Reyes ( PBA Rush Basketball analyst)
- Ela Gomez (PBA courtside reporter)
- Allan Gregorio (PBA Rush Basketball analyst,NCAA Basketball anaylst)
- Sev Sarmenta (PBA, PVL, Spikers Turf play-by-play)
- Yoyo Sarmenta (UAAP Basketball play-by-play)
- Jutt Sulit (PBA and NCAA play by play)
- Nadj Miravalles ( NCAA courtside reporter)
- Eileen Shi (PBA courtside reporter)
- Gab Reyes (PBA Rush courtside reporter)
- Charles Tiu (PBA Rush Basketball analyst, Basketball Science Host, NBA Hype co-Host)
- Vince Hizon (PBA Rush Basketball analyst)
- Mark Molina (PBA Rush Basketball analyst)
- Carmela Tunay (PVL, Spikers Turf, UAAP Volleyball analyst The Game host)
- Jong Uichico (PBA Rush Basketball analyst)
- Norman Black (UAAP Basketball analyst)
- Jude Turcuato (UAAP Basketball play-by-play)
- Dominic Uy (PBA and NCAA analyst)
- James Velasquez (PBA Rush play by play)

=== Past on-air staff ===
- Peaches Aberin
- Don Allado
- Mara Aquino
- Ramon Bautista
- Patricia Bermudez-Hizon
- Mich Del Carmen-Elorde
- Janeena Chan
- Rheema Chanco
- Ai Dela Cruz
- Lia Cruz
- Stephanie Cueva
- Rizza Diaz
- Joy Delorey
- Hans Montenegro
- Rado Dimalibot
- Kenneth Duremdes
- Amanda Fernandez
- Tex Suter
- Jing Jamlang
- Jojo Lastimosa
- Vitto Lazatin
- Rheena Villamor
- Laura Lehmann Pessumal
- Frankie Lim
- Miakka Lim
- Cesca Litton-Kalaw
- Chino Lui Pio
- Peter Martin
- Butch Maniego
- TJ Manotoc
- Eric Menk
- Jessica Mendoza
- L.A. Mumar
- Renz Ongkiko
- Chiqui Pablo
- Erika Padilla-Cariaso
- Joey Santa Maria
- George Rocha
- Benjie Paras
- Barry Pascua
- Ed Picson
- Chot Reyes
- Trish Roque
- Judy Saril
- Angelika Schmeing-Cruz
- Boyet Sison
- Niña Sison
- Pia Boren
- Jannelle So
- Mon Liboro
- Sam YG
- Mark Zambrano
- Noel Zarate
- Denice Dinsay
- Aaron Atayde
- Sel Guevara
- Gianna Llanes (former MPBL courtside reporter)
- Jeffrey Cariaso
- Chuck Araneta (former PBA play by play commentator)
- Shiela Salaysay (former MPBL courtside reporter)

== See also ==
- Philippine Basketball Association
- TV5
- One Sports (TV channel)
- PBA Rush
- PBA on NBN/IBC
- ABS-CBN Sports
- Solar Sports
- TAP Sports
- Premier Sports (Philippine TV channel)
