= List of 2024–25 PBA season transactions =

This is a list of transactions that have taken place during the off-season and the 2024–25 PBA season.

== Retirement ==
Date	Name	Team(s) played (years)	Age	Notes	Ref.
February 24	Alex Cabagnot	Sta. Lucia Realtors (2005–2007); Coca-Cola Tigers (2007–2009); Burger King Whoppers (2009–2010); San Miguel Beermen/Petron Blaze Boosters (2010–2014, 2014–2021); GlobalPort Batang Pier (2014); Terrafirma Dyip (2021–2023); Converge FiberXers (2024–2025)	42	Retirement specific to the PBA. He also became an assistant coach for the UE Red Warriors. Also played abroad.	

== Coaching changes ==
=== Off-season ===
Departure date	Team	Outgoing head coach	Reason for departure	Hire date	Incoming head coach	Last coaching position	Ref.
June 7	NLEX Road Warriors	Frankie Lim	Released	June 7	Jong Uichico	NLEX Road Warriors assistant coach (2023–2024)	
August 1	Converge FiberXers	Aldin Ayo	Released	August 1	Franco Atienza (interim)	Converge FiberXers assistant coach (2022–2024)	

=== In-season ===
Departure date	Team	Outgoing head coach	Reason for departure	Hire date	Incoming head coach	Last coaching position	Ref.
October 17	Terrafirma Dyip	Johnedel Cardel	Released	October 17	Raymond Tiongco (interim)	Terrafirma Dyip assistant coach (2019–2024)	
December 13	San Miguel Beermen	Jorge Gallent	Demoted to team consultant	December 13	Leo Austria	San Miguel Beermen team consultant (2022–2024)	

== Player movements ==
=== Trades ===
July
July 2	To Blackwater Bossing: Kib Montalbo; Jewel Ponferada; 2029 (S53) TNT second-round pick	To TNT Tropang Giga: Rey Nambatac
July 13	To Barangay Ginebra San Miguel: Isaac Go; Stephen Holt; 2024 (S49) Terrafirma first-round pick	To Terrafirma Dyip: Stanley Pringle; Christian Standhardinger; 2024 (S49) Barangay Ginebra first-round pick
July 15	To Barangay Ginebra San Miguel: Ben Adamos	To NorthPort Batang Pier: Sidney Onwubere
July 15	To Magnolia Chicken Timplados Hotshots: Zavier Lucero	To NorthPort Batang Pier: Jio Jalalon; Abu Tratter
July 17	To Barangay Ginebra San Miguel: 2025 (S50) Terrafirma second-round pick	To Terrafirma Dyip: Didat Hanapi; Paolo Hernandez
July 17	To NorthPort Batang Pier: 2027 (S51) Terrafirma second-round pick	To Terrafirma Dyip: Brent Paraiso
July 17	To Blackwater Bossing: Miguel Corteza	To Rain or Shine Elasto Painters: 2027 (S51) Blackwater second-round pick (from TNT)
September
September 11	To NLEX Road Warriors: Javee Mocon	To Phoenix Fuel Masters: Ato Ular; 2027 (S51) NLEX second-round pick
November
November 12	To Converge FiberXers: Jordan Heading	To Terrafirma Dyip: Aljun Melecio; Keith Zaldivar; 2027 (S51) Converge first-round pick
November 25	To San Miguel Beermen: Andreas Cahilig; Juami Tiongson	To Terrafirma Dyip: Vic Manuel; Terrence Romeo
February
February 18	To Blackwater Bossing: BJ Andrade	To Converge FiberXers: Rey Suerte
April
April 2	To NorthPort Batang Pier: Avan Nava; 2025 (S50) San Miguel second-round pick (from North Port)	To San Miguel Beermen: JM Calma
April 23	To Blackwater Bossing: Abu Tratter	To NorthPort Batang Pier: James Kwekuteye
May
May 27	To Magnolia Chicken Timplados Hotshots: William Navarro	To NorthPort Batang Pier: Calvin Abueva; Jerrick Balanza; 2027 (S51) Magnolia second-round pick
June
June 2	To Converge FiberXers: Mikey Williams	To TNT Tropang 5G: Jordan Heading

=== Free agents ===
Player	Date signed	Contract amount	Contract length	New team	Former team	Ref.
Matt Nieto	May 16, 2024	Not disclosed	2 years	NLEX Road Warriors		
Ben Adamos	June 7	Not disclosed	1 year	NorthPort Batang Pier		
Kris Rosales	June 7	Not disclosed	1 year	NorthPort Batang Pier		
Paul Zamar	June 7	Not disclosed	1 year	NorthPort Batang Pier		
Bradwyn Guinto	June 8	Not disclosed	2 years	Blackwater Bossing		
Jaydee Tungcab	June 8	Not disclosed	2 years	Blackwater Bossing		
John Amores	June 9	Not disclosed	2 years	NorthPort Batang Pier		
JM Calma	June 9	Not disclosed	2 years	NorthPort Batang Pier		
Joshua Munzon	June 21	Not disclosed	2 years	NorthPort Batang Pier		
Allyn Bulanadi	July 25	Not disclosed	1 year	NorthPort Batang Pier		
Joseph Eriobu	August 2	Not disclosed	1 year	Magnolia Chicken Timplados Hotshots		
Kris Rosales	August 5	Not disclosed	Not disclosed	San Miguel Beermen	NorthPort Batang Pier	
Alex Cabagnot	August 5	Not disclosed	Not disclosed	Converge FiberXers	Taiwan Mustangs (The Asian Tournament)	
Beau Belga	September 11	Not disclosed	1 year	Rain or Shine Elasto Painters		
Joe Devance	September 24	Not disclosed	Not disclosed	Barangay Ginebra San Miguel	Retired (Note: Last played for the Barangay Ginebra San Miguel in 2022)	
Jordan Heading	November 18	₱200,000 per month	2 years	Converge FiberXers	West Adelaide Bearcats (NBL1 Central)	
Troy Rosario	November 25	Not disclosed	3 years	Barangay Ginebra San Miguel	Blackwater Bossing	
JB Bahio	November 29	Not disclosed	Not disclosed	NLEX Road Warriors	Nueva Ecija Rice Vanguards (MPBL)	
Jielo Razon	December 4	Not disclosed	1 year	TNT Tropang Giga	Parañaque Patriots (MPBL)	
Aljon Mariano	January 10, 2025	Not disclosed	2 years	Barangay Ginebra San Miguel		
MJ Garcia	January 18	Not disclosed	Not disclosed	Converge FiberXers	Pampanga Giant Lanterns (MPBL)	
Kim Aurin	January 29	Not disclosed	2 years	TNT Tropang Giga		
Jayson Castro	January 29	Not disclosed	2 years	TNT Tropang Giga		
Poy Erram	January 29	Not disclosed	1 year	TNT Tropang Giga		
Rey Nambatac	January 29	Not disclosed	2 years	TNT Tropang Giga		
Jericho Cruz	February 7	Not disclosed	2 years	San Miguel Beermen		
Troy Mallillin	February 24	Not disclosed	Not disclosed	Blackwater Bossing	San Miguel Beermen	
Jackson Corpuz	March 14	Not disclosed	Not disclosed	Converge FiberXers	Magnolia Chicken Timplados Hotshots	
Prince Caperal	March 18	Not disclosed	1 conference	Blackwater Bossing	Zamboanga Valientes (Dubai International Basketball Championship)	
Jhan Nermal	April 2	Not disclosed	Not disclosed	Converge FiberXers	NLEX Road Warriors	
Simon Enciso	April 8	Not disclosed	2 years	TNT Tropang 5G	San Miguel Beermen	
Mike Malonzo	April 14	Not disclosed	3 years	Rain or Shine Elasto Painters		
JC Cullar	May 1	Not disclosed	Not disclosed	Phoenix Fuel Masters	Nueva Ecija Rice Vanguards (MPBL)	
Kevin Racal	May 5	Not disclosed	1 year	Converge FiberXers		
Kelly Williams	May 13	Not disclosed	1 year	TNT Tropang 5G		
Javee Mocon	May 25	Not disclosed	1 year	NLEX Road Warriors		
Kris Porter	May 28	Not disclosed	Not disclosed	Rain or Shine Elasto Painters	Batangas City Tanduay Rum Masters (MPBL)	
Mike Nieto	June 3	Not disclosed	Not disclosed	TNT Tropang 5G	Converge FiberXers	
Juami Tiongson	June 5	Not disclosed	3 years	San Miguel Beermen		
Gelo Alolino	June 16	Not disclosed	1 conference	Converge FiberXers	Terrafirma Dyip	
JB Bahio	June 18	Not disclosed	2 years	NLEX Road Warriors		
Adrian Nocum	July 1	₱420,000 per month (max. contract)	3 years	Rain or Shine Elasto Painters		
Player	Date signed	Contract amount	Contract length	New team	Former team	Ref

=== 3x3 ===
Player	Date	Movement	Mother team	3x3 team	Ref.
Chris Exciminiano	July 18	Promoted to mother team	TNT Tropang Giga	TNT Triple Giga	
Almond Vosotros	July 18	Promoted to mother team	TNT Tropang Giga	TNT Triple Giga	

=== Going to other Philippine leagues ===
Player	Date signed	New team	New league	Former PBA team	Ref.
Sherwin Concepcion	June 15, 2024	Abra Weavers	MPBL	Rain or Shine Elasto Painters	
Allen Mina	June 17, 2024	Pangasinan Heatwaves	MPBL	Terrafirma Dyip	
JP Calvo	July 31, 2024	South Cotabato Warriors	MPBL	Terrafirma Dyip	
Kyt Jimenez	February 16, 2025	Sarangani Gripper Motorcycle Tire	MPBL	San Miguel Beermen	
Vic Manuel	March 1, 2025	Pangasinan Heatwaves	MPBL	Terrafirma Dyip	
Alex Cabagnot	March 4, 2025	Basilan Viva Portmasters	MPBL	Converge FiberXers	
Yousef Taha	Not disclosed	Abra Solid North Weavers	MPBL	NLEX Road Warriors	
Jeff Chan	Not disclosed	Biñan Tatak Gel	MPBL	NorthPort Batang Pier	
Chris Lalata	Not disclosed	Pampanga Giant Lanterns	MPBL	Phoenix Fuel Masters	
Donald Gumaru	Not disclosed	Pampanga Giant Lanterns	MPBL	Barangay Ginebra San Miguel	
Michael DiGregorio	Not disclosed	Pangasinan Heatwaves	MPBL	Blackwater Bossing	
Diego Dario	Not disclosed	Quezon Huskers	MPBL	Meralco Bolts	
Eric Camson	Not disclosed	Rizal Golden Coolers	MPBL	Terrafirma Dyip	
Nick Demusis	June 17, 2025	Nueva Ecija Rice Vanguards	MPBL	Rain or Shine Elasto Painters	

=== Going abroad ===
Player	Date signed	New team	New country	Former PBA team	Ref.
Javi Gómez de Liaño	June 20, 2024	Anyang Jung Kwan Jang Red Boosters	South Korea	Terrafirma Dyip	
Arvin Tolentino	May 30, 2025	Seoul SK Knights	South Korea	NorthPort Batang Pier	

== 2024 PBA draft ==
The PBA season 49 draft was held on July 14, 2024, at Glorietta Activity Center in Makati. A total of 48 amateur players were selected in 6 rounds of draft.

Round	Pick	Player	Date signed	Contract length	Team (Note: Team denotes the team that holds the players' draft rights at the time of contract signing. Teams in parentheses denotes the teams that drafted the players before any trade or free agent signing occurred)	Ref.
1	1	Justine Baltazar	December 11	1 year	Converge FiberXers	
1	2	Sedrick Barefield	July 23	2 years	Blackwater Bossing	
1	3	RJ Abarrientos	July 29	3 years	Barangay Ginebra San Miguel	
1	4	Kai Ballungay	July 31	3 years	Phoenix Fuel Masters	
1	6	Jonnel Policarpio	July 29	3 years	NLEX Road Warriors	
1	7	Caelan Tiongson	July 28	3 years	Rain or Shine Elasto Painters	
1	8	Felix Pangilinan-Lemetti	July 19	3 years	Rain or Shine Elasto Painters	
1	9	Jerom Lastimosa	July 26	3 years	Magnolia Chicken Timplados Hotshots	
1	10	Mark Nonoy	October 17	2 years	Terrafirma Dyip	
1	11	CJ Cansino	August 5	2 years	Meralco Bolts	
1	12	Avan Nava	August 15	1 year	San Miguel Beermen	
2	13	Francis Escandor	July 19	1 year	Rain or Shine Elasto Painters	
2	14	Evan Nelle	July 19	2 years	NorthPort Batang Pier	
2	15	CJ Catapusan	August 6	2 years	Terrafirma Dyip	
2	16	Mike Malonzo	November 26	Rest of the season	Rain or Shine Elasto Painters	
2	17	Didat Hanapi	August 1	1 year	Terrafirma Dyip (rights acquired from Barangay Ginebra)	
2	18	Brandon Ramirez	December 18	2 years	NLEX Road Warriors	
2	19	Paolo Javillonar	November 21	Not disclosed	Converge FiberXers	
2	20	Miguel Corteza	July 24	1 year	Blackwater Bossing (rights acquired from Rain or Shine)	
2	22	Paolo Hernandez	August 1	1 year	Terrafirma Dyip (rights acquired from Barangay Ginebra)	
2	23	Kurt Reyson	December 12	Not disclosed	Meralco Bolts	
3	25	Ronan Santos	March 26	Not disclosed	Converge FiberXers	
3	26	DJ Mitchell	July 24	1 year	Blackwater Bossing	
3	27	Peter Alfaro	August 2	Not disclosed	Magnolia Chicken Timplados Hotshots (drafted by Terrafirma but left unsigned)	
3	28	CJ Payawal	July 29	1 year	TNT Tropang Giga (drafted by Phoenix but left unsigned)	
3	29	Agem Miranda	November 26	Not disclosed	NorthPort Batang Pier	
3	30	Xyrus Torres	September 19	Not disclosed	NLEX Road Warriors	
3	34	Paul Garcia	August 5	2 years	Barangay Ginebra San Miguel	
3	35	JP Maguliano	Not disclosed	Not disclosed	Meralco Bolts	
