= 2025 AsiaBasket International Invitational =

Ninth tournament of AsiaBasket; second in 2025

- Official promotional poster (as International Championship)

Tournament details
- Country: Philippines
- City: San Juan
- Venue: Playtime Filoil Centre
- Dates: July 20–25, 2025
- Teams: 8

Final positions
- Champions: (Philippines) Adamson Soaring Falcons
- Runners-up: (Philippines) UST Growling Tigers
- Third place: (Philippines) Letran Knights
- Fourth place: (Philippines) San Beda Red Lions

The 2025 AsiaBasket International Invitational was the ninth tournament organized by AsiaBasket and the fourth running of the International Championship. The tournament ran from July 20 to 25, 2025 and featured eight teams representing four countries. All games were held at Playtime Filoil Centre in San Juan, Philippines.

The De La Salle Green Archers were defending champions but did not enter this tournament. The tournament was won by the Adamson Soaring Falcons, defeating the UST Growling Tigers, 68–63, in the championship.

== Teams ==
This tournament features eight teams, making it the smallest pool of teams in league history. Five teams represent the Philippines including the debuting UST Growling Tigers. Taiwan (Chinese Taipei) and the United States each have one team. In addition, Canada will be represented for the first time with sole entrant United Prep Canada.

Team	Affiliation	Appearance	Last appearance	Best result
(Philippines) Adamson Soaring Falcons	Adamson University	3rd	CCT 2025	Runner-up (1x)
(Philippines) Benilde Blazers	De La Salle–College of Saint Benilde	6th	International 2024	Champion (1x)
(Chinese Taipei) Formosa Tiger Kings	National Formosa University	2nd	International 2024	Quarterfinalist (1x)
(United States) Lakas California	—N/a	2nd	International 2024	Group stage (1x)
(Philippines) Letran Knights	Colegio de San Juan de Letran	2nd	Las Piñas 2024	Quarterfinalist (1x)
(Philippines) San Beda Red Lions	San Beda University	5th	CCT 2025	Runner-up (1x)
United Prep Canada	—N/a	Debut	—N/a	
(Philippines) UST Growling Tigers	University of Santo Tomas	Debut	—N/a	

== Group stage ==
The tournament uses the two-group format used since the 2022 International Championship, with the eight teams divided into two groups of four. From there, each team plays one game against all other teams from the same group, with each team playing three games. All teams will automatically qualify for the single-elimination knockout stage.

On July 22, the league announced that the games scheduled for that day have been cancelled due to conditions brought by the southwest moonsoon. All teams ended up only playing two games each.

=== Group A ===
Pos	Team	Pld	W	L	PF	PA	PD	PCT	SBU	CSJL	UST	LCA
1	San Beda Red Lions	2	2	0	169	138	+31	1.000	—	Canc.	87–84	82–54
2	Letran Knights	2	2	0	185	165	+20	1.000	Canc.	—	88–87	97–78
3	UST Growling Tigers	2	0	2	171	175	−4	.000	84–87	87–88	—	Canc.
4	Lakas California	2	0	2	132	179	−47	.000	54–82	78–97	Canc.	—

Source: Schedule
Rules for classification: 1) Win percentage; 2) Head-to-head record; 3) Head-to-head point differential; 4) Head-to-head points scored; 5) Overall point differential; 6) Overall points scored.

July 20
4:00 pm

Boxscore

San Beda Red Lions (Philippines)	82–54	(United States) Lakas California
Pts: Andrada 22; Rebs: Etulle 13; Asts: Sajonia 5		Pts: Malinis, Reyes 9 Rebs: Spinoso 11; Asts: Dimalanta 5

Playtime Filoil Centre, San Juan

July 20
6:00 pm

Boxscore

Letran Knights (Philippines)	88–87	(Philippines) UST Growling Tigers
Pts: Gammad 16; Rebs: Tapenio 10; Asts: Manalili 10		Pts: Llemit 19; Rebs: Akowe 21; Asts: Padrigao 10

Playtime Filoil Centre, San Juan

July 21
4:00 pm

Boxscore

Letran Knights (Philippines)	97–78	(United States) Lakas California
Pts: Alejandro 19; Rebs: Mundas 10; Asts: Diamante 8		Pts: Andrews, Spinoso 18; Rebs: Spinoso 15; Asts: four players 4

Playtime Filoil Centre, San Juan

July 21
6:00 pm

Boxscore

UST Growling Tigers (Philippines)	84–87	(Philippines) San Beda Red Lions
Pts: Llemit 21; Rebs: Akowe 15; Asts: Paranada 7		Pts: Andrada 24; Rebs: Etulle 9 Asts: Gonzales 13

Playtime Filoil Centre, San Juan

July 22
2:00 pm

Lakas California (United States)	vs.	(Philippines) UST Growling Tigers
Game cancelled due to weather conditions

Playtime Filoil Centre, San Juan

July 22
6:00 pm

San Beda Red Lions (Philippines)	vs.	(Philippines) Letran Knights
Game cancelled due to weather conditions

Playtime Filoil Centre, San Juan

=== Group B ===
Pos	Team	Pld	W	L	PF	PA	PD	PCT	AdU	CSB	NFU	UPC
1	Adamson Soaring Falcons	2	2	0	139	124	+15	1.000	—	Canc.	64–61	75–63
2	Benilde Blazers	2	2	0	185	173	+12	1.000	Canc.	—	91–84	94–89
3	Formosa Tiger Kings	2	0	2	145	155	−10	.000	61–64	84–91	—	Canc.
4	United Prep Canada	2	0	2	152	169	−17	.000	63–75	89–94	Canc.	—

Source: Schedule
Rules for classification: 1) Win percentage; 2) Head-to-head record; 3) Head-to-head point differential; 4) Head-to-head points scored; 5) Overall point differential; 6) Overall points scored.

July 20
12:00 pm

Boxscore

Adamson Soaring Falcons (Philippines)	75–63	United Prep Canada
Pts: Fransman, Manzano 12; Rebs: Fransman 10; Asts: Montebon 5		Pts: Paul 20; Rebs: Faty 10; Asts: Bah 4

Playtime Filoil Centre, San Juan

July 20
2:00 pm

Boxscore

Formosa Tiger Kings (Chinese Taipei)	84–91	(Philippines) Benilde Blazers
Pts: Jones 31; Rebs: Jones, Thaher 10; Asts: Lee 4		Pts: Cometa, Moore 12; Rebs: Gaspay 6 Asts: Torres 5

Playtime Filoil Centre, San Juan

July 21
12:00 pm

Boxscore

Formosa Tiger Kings (Chinese Taipei)	61–64	(Philippines) Adamson Soaring Falcons
Pts: Lin 12; Rebs: Tsang 8 Asts: Lin 5		Pts: Manzano 12; Rebs: Gaye 9 Asts: three players 3

Playtime Filoil Centre, San Juan

July 21
2:00 pm

Boxscore

Benilde Blazers (Philippines)	94–89	United Prep Canada
Pts: Eusebio 19; Rebs: Gaspay 8 Asts: Umali 6		Pts: Hosannah, Mongard 24; Rebs: Paul 12; Asts: Tan 9

Playtime Filoil Centre, San Juan

July 22
12:00 pm

Adamson Soaring Falcons (Philippines)	vs.	(Philippines) Benilde Blazers
Game cancelled due to weather conditions

Playtime Filoil Centre, San Juan

July 22
4:00 pm

United Prep Canada	vs.	(Chinese Taipei) Formosa Tiger Kings
Game cancelled due to weather conditions

Playtime Filoil Centre, San Juan

== Knockout stage ==
The knockout stage format has changed for the first time since the 2023 Las Piñas Championship.

In the quarterfinals, the first-seeded teams were matched with the fourth-seeded teams from the opposing group. The same process followed for the second- and third-seeded teams. Teams that won their quarterfinal game advanced to the semifinals while those that lost moved on to the classification bracket.

In the classification round, winning teams competed for fifth place while losing teams competed for seventh place. In the semifinals, winning teams advanced to the championship while losing teams played for the bronze medal.

Fifth-place game
B2	(Philippines) Benilde	98
A4	(United States) Lakas California	81
Seventh-place game
B4	(Canada) United Prep	55
B3	(Chinese Taipei) Formosa	51

Classification round
B4	(Canada) United Prep	96
B2	(Philippines) Benilde	107
A4	(United States) Lakas California	70
B3	(Chinese Taipei) Formosa	67

Quarterfinals
A1	(Philippines) San Beda	68
B4	(Canada) United Prep	58
B2	(Philippines) Benilde	67
A3	(Philippines) UST	80
B1	(Philippines) Adamson	89
A4	(United States) Lakas California	55
A2	(Philippines) Letran	104
B3	(Chinese Taipei) Formosa	100

Semifinals
A1	(Philippines) San Beda	68
A3	(Philippines) UST	82
B1	(Philippines) Adamson	76
A2	(Philippines) Letran	69

Championship
A3	(Philippines) UST	63
B1	(Philippines) Adamson	68
Third-place game
A1	(Philippines) San Beda	0
A2	(Philippines) Letran	20

=== Day 1 ===
==== Quarterfinals ====
July 23
9:00 am

Boxscore

Adamson Soaring Falcons (Philippines)	89–55	(United States) Lakas California

Playtime Filoil Centre, San Juan

July 23
11:00 am

Boxscore

Letran Knights (Philippines)	104–100	(Chinese Taipei) Formosa Tiger Kings

Playtime Filoil Centre, San Juan

July 23
1:00 pm

Boxscore

San Beda Red Lions (Philippines)	68–58	United Prep Canada

Playtime Filoil Centre, San Juan

July 23
3:00 pm

Boxscore

Benilde Blazers (Philippines)	67–80	(Philippines) UST Growling Tigers

Playtime Filoil Centre, San Juan

=== Day 2 ===
==== 5th–8th classification round ====
July 24
12:00 pm

Boxscore

Lakas California (United States)	70–67	(Chinese Taipei) Formosa Tiger Kings

Playtime Filoil Centre, San Juan

July 24
2:00 pm

Boxscore

United Prep Canada	96–107	(Philippines) Benilde Blazers

Playtime Filoil Centre, San Juan

==== Semifinals ====
July 24
4:00 pm

Boxscore

San Beda Red Lions (Philippines)	68–82	(Philippines) UST Growling Tigers

Playtime Filoil Centre, San Juan

July 24
6:00 pm

Boxscore

Adamson Soaring Falcons (Philippines)	76–69	(Philippines) Letran Knights

Playtime Filoil Centre, San Juan

=== Day 3 ===
==== Seventh-place game ====
July 25
1:00 pm

Boxscore

Formosa Tiger Kings (Chinese Taipei)	51–55	United Prep Canada

Playtime Filoil Centre, San Juan

==== Fifth-place game ====
July 25
3:00 pm

Boxscore

Benilde Blazers (Philippines)	98–81	(United States) Lakas California

Playtime Filoil Centre, San Juan

==== Battle for third ====
July 25

San Beda Red Lions (Philippines)	0–20	(Philippines) Letran Knights
Game forfeited in favor of Letran

Playtime Filoil Centre, San Juan

==== Championship ====
July 25
5:30 pm

Boxscore

Adamson Soaring Falcons (Philippines)	68–63	(Philippines) UST Growling Tigers

Playtime Filoil Centre, San Juan

== Awards ==
Awards	Winner (s)	Team
Most Valuable Player	Collins Akowe	(Nigeria) UST Growling Tigers
Finals MVP	John Earl Medina	(Philippines) Adamson Soaring Falcons
Coach of the Tournament	Nash Racela	(Philippines) Adamson Soaring Falcons
