= 2024 AsiaBasket International Championship =

Seventh tournament of AsiaBasket; first in 2024

Tournament details
- Country: Philippines
- City: Taguig
- Venue: Enderun Colleges
- Dates: July 9–16, 2024
- Teams: 10

Final positions
- Champions: (Philippines) NU Bulldogs
- Runners-up: (Philippines) Adamson Soaring Falcons
- Third place: (Philippines) Benilde Blazers
- Fourth place: (Philippines) FEU Tamaraws

The 2024 AsiaBasket International Championship was the seventh tournament under the AsiaBasket. The tournament took place at the Enderun Colleges in Taguig from July 9 to 16.

The Benilde Blazers, the defending champions, were among the teams competing.

== Background ==
Prior to the announcement of the 2024 International Championship, AsiaBasket in January announced the 2024 Cebu Championship during the Sinulog festival. Initially announced to take place in April at the Hoops Dome in Lapu-Lapu City, the tournament eventually did not push through.

The 2024 International Championship was announced on July 7, 2024, two days before the start of the event.

== Teams ==
Similar to previous tournaments since International 2022, ten teams compete, including seven from the Philippines, one from Indonesia, one from the United States, and for the first time in AsiaBasket, one from Taiwan.

Out of the ten teams competing, seven of them make their AsiaBasket debut, while the Benilde Blazers, FEU Tamaraws, and San Beda Red Lions are the three returning teams in this tournament.

Name	Locality / College	Country	Last appearance	Best result
National Formosa University	National Formosa University	Chinese Taipei	Debut	
DKI Jakarta Indonesia	Jakarta	Indonesia	Debut	
Adamson Soaring Falcons	Adamson University	Philippines	Debut	
Benilde Blazers	De La Salle–College of Saint Benilde	Philippines	Dasmariñas 2023	Champion (1x)
FEU Tamaraws	Far Eastern University	Philippines	Las Piñas 2023	Quarterfinalist (1x)
Mapúa Cardinals	Mapúa University	Philippines	Debut	
NU Bulldogs	National University	Philippines	Debut	
Phenom Blue Fire	—N/a	Philippines	Debut	
San Beda Red Lions	San Beda University	Philippines	Las Piñas 2023	Runner-up (1x)
Lakas California	California	United States	Debut	

== Group stage ==
This tournament uses the same two-group format used since International 2022, with the ten teams being divided into two groups of five. From there each team plays one game against all other teams from the same group, with each team playing four games. The top four teams will advance to the single-elimination knockout stage, as has been the case since Las Piñas 2023, meaning that only the lowest-ranking team in each group will be eliminated after the group stage.

=== Group A ===
Pos	Team	Pld	W	L	PF	PA	PD	PCT	Qualification	NU	CSB	NFU	PBF	LCA
1	NU Bulldogs	4	4	0	365	275	+90	1.000	Quarterfinals	—	92–72	101–76	80–65	92–62
2	Benilde Blazers	4	2	2	352	355	−3	.500 (Note: Benilde wins tiebreaker over Formosa by head-to-head victory.)	Quarterfinals	72–92	—	92–79	100–94	88–90
3	National Formosa University	4	2	2	334	342	−8	.500	Quarterfinals	76–101	79–92	—	83–71	96–78
4	Phenom Blue Fire	4	1	3	307	331	−24	.250 (Note: Phenom wins tiebreaker over Lakas California by head-to-head victory.)	Quarterfinals	65–80	94–100	71–83	—	77–68
5	Lakas California	4	1	3	298	353	−55	.250		62–92	90–88	78–96	68–77	—

Rules for classification: 1) Win percentage; 2) Head-to-head record; 3) Head-to-head point differential; 4) Head-to-head points scored; 5) Overall point differential; 6) Overall points scored.

=== Group B ===
Pos	Team	Pld	W	L	PF	PA	PD	PCT	Qualification	AdU	FEU	MU	SBU	DKI
1	Adamson Soaring Falcons	4	4	0	293	215	+78	1.000	Quarterfinals	—	79–56	81–67	65–57	68–35
2	FEU Tamaraws	4	3	1	303	260	+43	.750	Quarterfinals	56–79	—	86–69	82–74	79–38
3	Mapúa Cardinals	4	2	2	324	300	+24	.500	Quarterfinals	67–81	69–86	—	89–75	99–58
4	San Beda Red Lions	4	1	3	295	279	+16	.250	Quarterfinals	57–65	74–82	75–89	—	89–43
5	DKI Jakarta Indonesia	4	0	4	174	335	−161	.000		35–68	38–79	58–99	43–89	—

Rules for classification: 1) Win percentage; 2) Head-to-head record; 3) Head-to-head point differential; 4) Head-to-head points scored; 5) Overall point differential; 6) Overall points scored.

== Knockout stage ==
In the quarterfinals, the first-seeded teams will be matched with the fourth-seeded teams from the opposing group. The same process will follow for the second- and third-seeded teams. Being single-elimination, the winner of each game advances to the next round. In the semifinals, the losing teams will compete in a third place game.

Quarterfinals
A1	(Philippines) NU	83
B4	(Philippines) San Beda	63
B2	(Philippines) FEU	94
A3	(Chinese Taipei) NFU	89
B1	(Philippines) Adamson	105
A4	(Philippines) Phenom	78
A2	(Philippines) Benilde	90
B3	(Philippines) Mapúa	63

Semifinals
A1	(Philippines) NU	85
B2	(Philippines) FEU	79
B1	(Philippines) Adamson	74
A2	(Philippines) Benilde	73

Finals
A1	(Philippines) NU	73
B1	(Philippines) Adamson	64
Third place
B2	(Philippines) FEU	77
A2	(Philippines) Benilde	84

== Awards ==
The individual league awards was given before the Finals of the 2024 AsiaBasket International Championship at the Enderun Colleges in Taguig.

Awards	Winner (s)	Team
Most Valuable Player	Steve Nash Enriquez	(Philippines) NU Bulldogs
Finals MVP	Steve Nash Enriquez	(Philippines) NU Bulldogs
All-AsiaBasket First Team	Veejay Pre	(Philippines) FEU Tamaraws
All-AsiaBasket First Team	AJ Fransman	(Philippines) Adamson Soaring Falcons
All-AsiaBasket First Team	Jonathan Ncheckube	(Chinese Taipei) National Formosa University
All-AsiaBasket First Team	Jake Figueroa	(Philippines) NU Bulldogs
All-AsiaBasket First Team	Janrey Pasaol	(Philippines) FEU Tamaraws
Coach of the Tournament	Jeff Napa	(Philippines) NU Bulldogs
