= PBA season 49 draft =

Player selection in Philippine basketball

General information
- Date: July 14, 2024
- Location: Glorietta Activity Center
- Networks: One Sports (RPTV, PBA Rush)

Overview
- League: Philippine Basketball Association
- First selection: Justine Baltazar (Converge FiberXers)

The PBA season 49 draft was the 39th edition of the PBA draft and the draft for the 2024–25 PBA season. It was held at Glorietta Activity Center in Makati on July 14, 2024, marking its first time at the venue since 2004. The league determined the drafting order based on the performance of the member teams from the 2023–24 season, with the Converge FiberXers, which finished last, picking first.

== Draft order ==
The draft order was determined based on the overall performance of the teams from the previous season. The Commissioner's Cup final ranking comprises 40% of the points, while the ranking of the Philippine Cup is 60%.

Draft order	Team	Final ranking		Total
Draft order	Team	COM	PHI	Total
1st	Converge FiberXers	12th	12th	12
2nd	Blackwater Bossing	11th	10th	10.4
3rd	Terrafirma Dyip	10th	8th	8.8
4th	Phoenix Fuel Masters	4th	11th	8.2
5th	NorthPort Batang Pier	6th	9th	7.8
6th	NLEX Road Warriors	9th	6th	7.2
7th	TNT Tropang Giga	8th	5th	6.2
8th	Rain or Shine Elasto Painters	7th	4th	5.2
9th	Magnolia Chicken Timplados Hotshots	2nd	7th	5
10th	Barangay Ginebra San Miguel	3rd	3rd	3
11th	Meralco Bolts	5th	1st	2.6
12th	San Miguel Beermen	1st	2nd	1.6

== Draft selections ==
PG	Point guard	SG	Shooting guard	SF	Small forward	PF	Power forward	C	Center	*	Mythical team member	^{#}	All-Star

=== 1st round ===
Pick	Player	Pos.	Country of birth	Team	School / club team
1	Justine Baltazar^{#}	PF/C	Philippines	Converge FiberXers	De La Salle / Pampanga Giant Lanterns (MPBL)
2	Sedrick Barefield	PG/SG	United States	Blackwater Bossing	Utah
3	RJ Abarrientos^{#}	PG	Philippines	Barangay Ginebra San Miguel (from Terrafirma) (Note: July 13, 2024: Terrafirma to Barangay Ginebra: Barangay Ginebra acquired Isaac Go, Stephen Holt, and a 2023 first-round pick; Terrafirma acquired Stanley Pringle, Christian Standhardinger, and a 2023 first-round pick)	FEU
4	Kai Ballungay	PF/C	United States	Phoenix Fuel Masters	Ateneo
5	Dave Ildefonso	SG/SF	Philippines	NorthPort Batang Pier	Ateneo
6	Jonnel Policarpio	PF/SF	Philippines	NLEX Road Warriors	De La Salle
7	Caelan Tiongson	PF/SF	United States	Rain or Shine Elasto Painters (from TNT via Blackwater) (Note: March 11, 2021: Blackwater to NLEX (three-team trade with TNT): NLEX acquired Don Trollano, Roi Sumang, Maurice Shaw, and a 2022 second-round pick (from TNT via Blackwater); Blackwater acquired David Semerad, Simon Enciso, a 2023 first-round pick (from TNT), and a 2024 second-round pick (from TNT); TNT acquired a 2020 first-round pick (from NLEX); February 14, 2024: Blackwater to Rain or Shine: Rain or Shine acquired a 2023 first-round pick (from TNT), and 2024 second-round pick (from TNT); Blackwater acquired Rey Nambatac)	Biola
8	Felix Pangilinan-Lemetti	PG	Sweden	Rain or Shine Elasto Painters	Salt Lake CC
9	Jerom Lastimosa	PG	Philippines	Magnolia Chicken Timplados Hotshots	Adamson
10	Mark Nonoy	PG	Philippines	Terrafirma Dyip (from Barangay Ginebra)	De La Salle / Iloilo United Royals (MPBL)
11	CJ Cansino^{#}	SG	Philippines	Meralco Bolts	UP Diliman / Iloilo United Royals (MPBL)
12	Avan Nava	SG/PG	Canada	San Miguel Beermen	St. Francis Xavier

=== 2nd round ===
Pick	Player	Pos.	Country of birth	Team	School / club team
13	Francis Escandor	SF/SG	Philippines	Rain or Shine Elasto Painters (from Converge) (Note: May 8, 2023: Converge to Rain or Shine: Rain or Shine acquired 2023 and 2024 second-round picks; Converge acquired Mike Nieto)	De La Salle / Manila Batang Sampaloc (MPBL)
14	Evan Nelle	PG	Philippines	NorthPort Batang Pier (from Blackwater via NLEX) (Note: November 16, 2021: Blackwater to NLEX: NLEX acquired Marion Magat and Blackwater's 2023 second-round pick; Blackwater acquired Mike Ayonayon and Will McAloney; December 11, 2023: NLEX to NorthPort (three-team trade with San Miguel): NLEX acquired Robert Bolick and Kent Salado (from NorthPort); NorthPort acquired Ben Adamos, Kris Rosales, and Blackwater's 2023 second-round pick (from NLEX); Allyn Bulanadi and Jeepy Faundo (from San Miguel); San Miguel acquired Don Trollano (from NLEX))	De La Salle
15	CJ Catapusan	SF	Philippines	Terrafirma Dyip	UP Diliman / Iloilo United Royals (MPBL)
16	Mike Malonzo	SF	Philippines	Rain or Shine Elasto Painters (from Phoenix) (Note: June 7, 2022: Phoenix to Rain or Shine: Rain or Shine acquired Nick Demusis, a 2022 first-round pick, and a 2023 second-round pick; Phoenix acquired Javee Mocon)	NU / San Juan Knights (MPBL)
17	Didat Hanapi	SG/SF	Philippines	Barangay Ginebra San Miguel (from NorthPort, (Note: May 8, 2023: NorthPort to Barangay Ginebra: Barangay Ginebra acquired a 2023 second-round pick; NorthPort acquired MJ Ayaay) traded to Terrafirma) (Note: July 17, 2024: Barangay Ginebra to Terrafirma: Terrafirma acquired the draft rights to Didat Hanapi (No. 17) and Paolo Hernandez (No. 22); Barangay Ginebra acquired a 2024 second-round pick)	Adamson / Manila Batang Sampaloc (MPBL)
18	Brandon Ramirez	C/PF	Canada	NLEX Road Warriors	York / Pampanga Giant Lanterns (MPBL)
19	Paolo Javillonar	PF/C	Philippines	Converge FiberXers (from TNT) (Note: January 6, 2020: TNT to Converge: Converge acquired Michael DiGregorio and a 2023 second-round pick; TNT acquired Simon Enciso)	Letran
20	Miguel Corteza	PF	Philippines	Rain or Shine Elasto Painters (traded to Blackwater) (Note: July 17, 2024: Blackwater to Rain or Shine: Rain or Shine acquired a 2025 second-round pick (from TNT); Blackwater acquired the draft rights to Miguel Corteza (No. 20))	Benilde / Marikina Shoemasters (MPBL)
21	Ben Phillips	PF/C	United States	Converge FiberXers (from Magnolia) (Note: April 11, 2024: Magnolia to Converge: Converge acquired a 2023 second-round pick; Magnolia acquired Jerrick Balanza)	De La Salle
22	Paolo Hernandez	SG	Philippines	Barangay Ginebra San Miguel (traded to Terrafirma)	Mapúa / San Juan Knights (MPBL)
23	Kurt Reyson	PG	Philippines	Meralco Bolts	Letran / Pampanga Giant Lanterns (MPBL)
24	Jason Credo	SF	Philippines	Converge FiberXers (from San Miguel) (Note: June 6, 2022: San Miguel to Converge: Converge acquired 2023 and 2024 second-round picks; San Miguel acquired Robbie Herndon)	Ateneo / Iloilo United Royals (MPBL)

=== 3rd round ===
Pick	Player	Pos.	Country of birth	Team	School / club team
25	Ronan Santos	C	Philippines	Converge FiberXers	Arellano / Pampanga Giant Lanterns (MPBL)
26	DJ Mitchell	PG/SG	United States	Blackwater Bossing	Hartford / Manila Batang Sampaloc (MPBL)
27	Peter Alfaro	PG	Philippines	Terrafirma Dyip	San Beda
28	CJ Payawal	SF	United States	Phoenix Fuel Masters	UE / Valenzuela Classic (MPBL)
29	Agem Miranda	PG/SG	Philippines	NorthPort Batang Pier	JRU
30	Xyrus Torres	SG	Philippines	NLEX Road Warriors	FEU / Quezon Huskers (MPBL)
31	Jared Brown	PG	United States	TNT Tropang Giga	Ateneo
32	Darwish Bederi	C/PF	Philippines	Rain or Shine Elasto Painters	UP Diliman
33	RV Berjay	PF/C	Philippines	Magnolia Chicken Timplados Hotshots	Ateneo / Iloilo United Royals (MPBL)
34	Paul Garcia	SG	United States	Barangay Ginebra San Miguel	Ateneo / Quezon City Toda Aksyon (MPBL)
35	JP Maguliano	PF	Philippines	Meralco Bolts	EAC / Pangasinan Heatwaves (MPBL)
36	Abdul Sawat	SF/PF	Philippines	San Miguel Beermen	UE / Quezon City Toda Aksyon (MPBL)

=== 4th round ===
Pick	Player	Pos.	Country of birth	Team	School / club team
37	Keith Pido	PG	Philippines	Blackwater Bossing	Perpetual / Parañaque Patriots (MPBL)
38	Chino Mosqueda	SG	Philippines	Phoenix Fuel Masters	NU / Quezon City Toda Aksyon (MPBL)
39	John Uduba	PF	Philippines	NorthPort Batang Pier	Olivarez / Parañaque Patriots (MPBL)
40	Denzel Wong	PG	Philippines	NLEX Road Warriors	Asia Pacific
41	Mark Neil Cruz	PF/C	Philippines	TNT Tropang Giga	CEU / Batangas City Tanduay Rum Masters (MPBL)
42	Ry dela Rosa	SG	United States	Magnolia Chicken Timplados Hotshots	JRU
43	Jordan Bartlett	PG	United States	Meralco Bolts	De La Salle
44	Ralph Robin	SG	Philippines	San Miguel Beermen	EAC / Pangasinan Heatwaves (MPBL)

- Converge, Terrafirma, Rain or Shine, and Barangay Ginebra passed during the round.

=== 5th round ===
Pick	Player	Pos.	Country of birth	Team	School / club team
45	Patrick Feliciano	SG	Philippines	Phoenix Fuel Masters	Diliman
46	Germy Mahinay	C	Philippines	NorthPort Batang Pier	NU
47	Adrian Partosa	SG	Philippines	NLEX Road Warriors	Benilde

- Blackwater, TNT, Magnolia, Meralco, and San Miguel passed during the round.

=== 6th round ===
Pick	Player	Pos.	Country of birth	Team	School / club team
48	Robbi Darang	PG	Philippines	NorthPort Batang Pier	Diliman / Bataan Risers (MPBL)

- Phoenix and NLEX passed during the round.

=== 7th round ===
A seventh round was held, but NorthPort passed, thus ending the draft.

== Trades involving draft picks ==
NOTE: Due to the postponement of the PBA season 46 draft, all draft picks from 2020 onwards are executed one year later.

=== Pre-draft trades ===
Prior to the draft, the following trades were made and resulted in exchanges of draft picks between teams. Converge retained the right to Alaska's second-round picks.

=== Post-draft trades ===
Post-draft trades are made after the draft begins. These trades are usually not confirmed until the next day.

== Combine ==
The PBA draft combine for this edition of the draft was held at the Ynares Sports Arena in Pasig from July 10 to 11, with 70 applicants expected to attend. 62 of the 70 showed up to the two-day event, with several unable to make it due to commitments with Strong Group Athletics (such as RJ Abarrientos and Dave Ildefonso) or were still in the US (such as Sedrick Barefield and Evan Nelle). Jonnel Policarpio was named the draft combine MVP as his team won the mini-tournament, and he, Justine Baltazar, Brandon Ramirez, Kurt Reyson, and Jordan Bartlett were named to the Mythical Five.

== Eligibility and entrants ==
Applications for the draft began on May 8 and ended on July 4. By the end of the application period, 70 players applied for the draft. The final tally was brought down to 67 after three players were dropped from the pool.

The following were the eligibility requirements for local players:

- Entrants of at least 22 years of age on the day of the draft must be four years removed from high school or have played one year of college basketball;
- Entrants between 19 and 21 years of age must have had at least two years of college education;
- All entrants must be at least 5 feet 6 inches (1.68 m) in height.

Eligibility requirements for Filipino-foreigner entrants are similar to the locals but with some additions:

- All Filipino-foreigner entrants must be a holder of a Philippine passport.
- All Filipino-foreigner entrants must have previously played professional basketball elsewhere and is not under contract with other teams.

Players who applied for the draft on the fourth or fifth year of eligibility will instead be assigned to a lottery separate from draft proper.

=== Notable entrants ===
==== Domestic league players ====
In this section, only entrants who have played for a UAAP, NCAA, CESAFI, UCAL, NCRAA or U.S. NCAA school are included. Additionally, all listed entrants have played in the Maharlika Pilipinas Basketball League prior to the draft unless specified.

- Justine Baltazar – F/C, De La Salle / Pampanga Giant Lanterns
- Darwish Bederi – C/F, UP / Sarangani Marlins
- RV Berjay – F, Ateneo / Iloilo United Royals
- CJ Cansino – G, UP / Iloilo United Royals
- CJ Catapusan – G, UP / Iloilo United Royals
- Miguel Corteza – F, Benilde / Marikina Shoemasters
- Mark Neil Cruz – C/F, CEU / Batangas City Tanduay Rum Masters
- Lugie Cuyos – G, USPF / Negros Muscovados
- Robbie Darang – G, Diliman College / Bataan Risers
- Ry dela Rosa – G, JRU / Iloilo United Royals
- Martin Enriquez – G, San Diego State / Quezon City Toda Aksyon
- Francis Escandor – G/F, De La Salle / Manila Batang Sampaloc
- Paul Garcia – G, Ateneo / Quezon City Toda Aksyon
- Alfren Gayosa – G, Arellano / Bicol Volcanoes
- Didat Hanapi – G, Adamson / Manila Batang Sampaloc
- Paolo Hernandez – Mapúa / San Juan Knights
- Pio Longa – F, UP / Negros Muscovados
- JP Maguliano – F, EAC / Pangasinan Heatwaves
- Germy Mahinay – C, NU Bulldogs basketball / Negros Muscovados
- Mike Malonzo – F, NU / San Juan Knights
- Agem Miranda – G, JRU / San Juan Knights
- DJ Mitchell – G, Hartford / Manila Batang Sampaloc
- Chino Mosqueda – G, NU / Quezon City Toda Aksyon
- Mark Nonoy – G, De La Salle / Iloilo United Royals
- Khen Osicoy – F, TIP / Mindoro Tamaraws
- Adrian Partosa – F, Benilde / Bacolod City of Smiles
- CJ Payawal – G, UE / Valenzuela Classic
- Keith Pido – G, Perpetual / Parañaque Patriots
- Brandon Ramirez – F/C, York / Pampanga Giant Lanterns
- Jielo Razon – G, Perpetual / Parañaque Patriots
- Kurt Reyson – G, Letran / Pampanga Giant Lanterns
- Ralph Robin – G, EAC / Pangasinan Heatwaves
- Ronan Santos – F, Arellano / Pampanga Giant Lanterns
- JP Sarao – F, Saint Francis of Assisi College / Parañaque Patriots
- Abdul Sawat – F, UE / Quezon City Toda Aksyon
- Jason Tan – G, JRU / Pangasinan Heatwaves
- Xyrus Torres – G, FEU / Quezon Huskers
- John Uduba – F, Olivarez / Parañaque Patriots

==== International league players ====
- RJ Abarrientos – G, FEU / Shinshu Brave Warriors (Japan)
- Sedrick Barefield – G, Utah / Taipei Fubon Braves (Taiwan)
- Dave Ildefonso – G, Ateneo / Suwon KT Sonicboom (Korea)
- Felix Pangilinan-Lemetti – G, Salt Lake CC / Fryshuset Basket (Sweden)
- Avan Nava – G, St. Francis Xavier / Seoul Samsung Thunders (Korea)
- Toan-Anh Nguyen – G, Algonquin College / Cantho Catfish (Vietnam)
- Caelan Tiongson – F, Biola / Taoyuan Leopards (Taiwan)

==== PBA on Tour / PBA D-League / PBA 3x3 players ====
- Peter Alfaro III – G, San Beda / TNT Tropang Giga
- Denzel Wong – G, Asia Pacific College / Marinerong Pilipino Skippers
- Jayson Puray – F, CEU

==== UAAP and NCAA players ====
- Kai Ballungay – F, Ateneo
- Jordan Bartlett – G, De La Salle
- Jared Brown – G, Ateneo
- Jason Credo – G/F, Ateneo
- Pao Javillonar – F/C, Letran
- Jerom Lastimosa – G, Adamson
- Evan Nelle – G, De La Salle
- Ben Phillips – F, De La Salle
- Jonnel Policarpio – F, De La Salle
- Jade Talampas – G, Arellano
