= NCAA Season 76 basketball tournaments =

76th NCAA season
- Host school: Mapua Institute of Technology
Men's Finals	G1	G2	Wins
Benilde Blazers	66	74	2
San Sebastian Stags	64	61	0
- Duration: October 9–11, 2000
- Arena(s): Rizal Memorial Coliseum
- Finals MVP: Mark Magsumbol
- Winning coach: Dong Vergeire (1st title)
- Semifinalists: JRU Heavy Bombers; Perpetual Altas
- TV network(s): PTV-4
Juniors' Finals	G1	G2	Wins
Letran Squires	61	55	0+1
Mapua Red Robins	75	77	2
- Duration: October 9–11, 2000
- Arena(s): Rizal Memorial Coliseum

The basketball tournaments of NCAA Season 76 are the Philippines' National Collegiate Athletic Association tournaments for basketball in its 2000–2001 season. Mapua Institute of Technology hosted the season, starting with an opening ceremony held at the Araneta Coliseum on July 22, 2000 followed by a quadruple-header. Games then are subsequently held at Rizal Memorial Coliseum and aired by PTV-4.

== Men's tournament ==
=== Elimination round ===
==== Team standings ====
Pos	Team	W	L	PCT	GB	Qualification
1	JRU Heavy Bombers	11	3	.786	—	Twice-to-beat in the semifinals
2	Perpetual Altas	10	4	.714	1	Twice-to-beat in the semifinals
3	Benilde Blazers (X)	9	5	.643	2	Twice-to-win in the semifinals
4	San Sebastian Stags	8	6	.571	3	Twice-to-win in the semifinals
5	Mapúa Cardinals (H)	5	9	.357 (Note: Head-to-head record: Mapua 1–1 San Beda (Mapua +8))	6	
6	San Beda Red Lions	5	9	.357	6	
7	PCU Dolphins	4	10	.286 (Note: Head-to-head record: PCU 1–1 Letran (PCU +3))	7	
8	Letran Knights	4	10	.286	7	

Source: Philippine Daily Inquirer
Rules for classification: 1) winning percentage; 2) if tied for #2 and #4, one-game playoff; 3) head-to-head record; 4) head-to-head point differential; 5) overall point differential
(H) Hosts; (X) Under probation

==== Match-up results ====
	Round 1							Round 2						
Team ╲ Game	1	2	3	4	5	6	7	8	9	10	11	12	13	14
Letran	Mapua school colors	SSC-R school colors	PCU school colors	UPHD school colors	CSB school colors	San Beda school colors	JRU school colors	UPHD school colors	CSB school colors	JRU school colors	PCU school colors	Mapua school colors	San Beda school colors	SSC-R school colors
Benilde	UPHD school colors	San Beda school colors	JRU school colors	Mapua school colors	Letran school colors	SSC-R school colors	PCU school colors	SSC-R school colors	Letran school colors	JRU school colors	San Beda school colors	Mapua school colors	PCU school colors	UPHD school colors
JRU	San Beda school colors	UPHD school colors	CSB school colors	SSC-R school colors	PCU school colors	Mapua school colors	Letran school colors	Mapua school colors	PCU school colors	Letran school colors	CSB school colors	SSC-R school colors	San Beda school colors	UPHD school colors
Mapúa	Letran school colors	PCU school colors	SSC-R school colors	CSB school colors	UPHD school colors	JRU school colors	San Beda school colors	JRU school colors	PCU school colors	SSC-R school colors	UPHD school colors	Letran school colors	CSB school colors	San Beda school colors
PCU	SSC-R school colors	Mapua school colors	Letran school colors	San Beda school colors	JRU school colors	UPHD school colors	CSB school colors	San Beda school colors	JRU school colors	Mapua school colors	SSC-R school colors	Letran school colors	UPHD school colors	CSB school colors
San Beda	JRU school colors	CSB school colors	UPHD school colors	PCU school colors	SSC-R school colors	Letran school colors	Mapua school colors	PCU school colors	UPHD school colors	CSB school colors	JRU school colors	Letran school colors	Mapua school colors	SSC-R school colors
San Sebastian	PCU school colors	Letran school colors	Mapua school colors	JRU school colors	San Beda school colors	CSB school colors	UPHD school colors	CSB school colors	Mapua school colors	PCU school colors	JRU school colors	UPHD school colors	Letran school colors	San Beda school colors
Perpetual	CSB school colors	JRU school colors	San Beda school colors	Letran school colors	Mapua school colors	PCU school colors	SSC-R school colors	Letran school colors	San Beda school colors	Mapua school colors	PCU school colors	SSC-R school colors	JRU school colors	CSB school colors

Source: Philippine Daily Inquirer
= Win; = OT win; = Loss; = OT loss

==== Scores ====
Results on top and to the right of the dashes are for first-round games; those to the bottom and to the left of it are second-round games.

Teams	CSJL	CSB	JRU	MIT	PCU	SBC	SSC-R	UPHR
Letran Knights	—	63–67	61–62	75–50	47–56	71–60	41–51	71–72
Benilde Blazers	62–58	—	64–66	77–59	97–77	63–66	60–67	76–78
JRU Heavy Bombers	74–66	73–60	—	69–67	93–75	78–73	74–79	87–76
Mapúa Cardinals	59–57	65–72	82–78	—	68–62	66–68	86–89	61–80
PCU Dolphins	55–61	65–71	85–76	63–70	—	61–68	53–52	75–88
San Beda Red Lions	65–88	83–90	80–72	74–84	78–65	—	86–76	67–81
San Sebastian Stags	67–58	62–66	87–67	59–78	50–47	85–83	—	77–87
Perpetual Altas	78–77	63–70	82–83	87–79	88–84	94–78	66–70	—

Source: Philippine Daily Inquirer
Legend: Blue = left column team win; Red = top row team win.
Matches with lighter background shading were decided after overtime.

=== Bracket ===
Semifinals (Top 2 twice-to-beat)
1	JRC	53	79
4	San Sebastian	60	97
2	UPHR	70	73
3	Benilde	73	86

Finals (Best-of-three playoff)
4	San Sebastian	64	61
3	Benilde	66	74

=== Semifinals ===
JRC and Perpetual Help have the twice-to-beat advantage. They only have to win once, while their opponents, twice, to progress.

==== (1) JRC vs. (4) San Sebastian ====
PTV-4

October 3
2:30 p.m.

JRU Heavy Bombers	53–60	San Sebastian Stags

Rizal Memorial Coliseum, Manila

PTV-4

October 6
2:30 p.m.

JRU Heavy Bombers	79–97	San Sebastian Stags
San Sebastian wins series in two games

Rizal Memorial Coliseum, Manila

Trailing 22-38 at the half of Game 1, the Heavy Bombers greeted the second half with a fierce 18-0 run to lead by two, with 11:37 to go, but the Stags' Nurjamjam Alfad and Christian Coronel conspired to defeat the Heavy Bombers and secured the win. Alfad finished with 14 points while Coronel sank the important free throws to win the game.

The Stags dominated the Heavy Bombers all throughout Game 2. Mark Macapagal pumped in 25 points, Christian Coronel had 19, and Nicole Uy contributed 15, including a one-handed slam that punctuated the Stags' dominance of the Heavy Bombers.

==== (2) Perpetual vs. (3) Benilde ====
PTV-4

October 3
4:00 p.m.

Perpetual Altas	70–73	Benilde Blazers

Rizal Memorial Coliseum, Manila

PTV-4

October 6
4:00 p.m.

Perpetual Altas	73–86	Benilde Blazers
Benilde wins series in two games

Rizal Memorial Coliseum, Manila

Benilde Blazers' star Sunday Salvacion knocked in a triple in the dying moments of the game as the Altas' Jojo Manalo and Milo Bonifacio heaved desperate attempts and failed to capitalized as time expired, leaving the boisterous Benilde gallery exploding in pandemonium.

Thanks to their deeper bench, Benilde Blazers upset title-favorites Perpetual Altas, thus entered the Finals for the first time since joining the NCAA in 1998.

=== Finals ===
The San Sebastian Stags are back in the Finals two years after they were beaten by the Letran Knights who were led by Kerby Raymundo and Christian Calaguio. The Benilde Blazers, on the other hand, are in their very first Finals appearance since joining the NCAA in 1998.

PTV-4

October 9
3:00 p.m.

Benilde Blazers	66–64	San Sebastian Stags
Scoring by half: 37-33
Pts: Mark Magsumbol 16		Pts: Jam Alfad 18

Rizal Memorial Coliseum, Manila

PTV-4

October 11
3:00 p.m.

Benilde Blazers	74–61	San Sebastian Stags
Scoring by half: 37-32
Pts: Mark Magsumbol 15		Pts: Jam Alfad 15
Benilde wins series, 2–0

Rizal Memorial Coliseum, Manila

- Finals Most Valuable Player: Mark Magsumbol (Benilde Blazers)

It was a nip and tuck affair and the Blazers leading most of the way of Game 1. Near the end of the game, San Sebastian took the lead for the first time, 64-61, thanks to Mark Macapagal and Paul Reguerra converting their free throws. However, Al Magpayo drew a three-point play off Macapagal to tie the game with 40 seconds remaining. Magpayo then gave an inbound pass to Mark Magsumbol then coasted on a game-winning layup to lift the Blazers past the Stags.

Duplicating their sister school's feat, the Blazers masterfully beat the Stags in Game 2 from the start, capitalized from the poor free-throw shooting of the San Sebastian squad. With their deep bench, the Blazers easily took the half, 37-25, before speeding to a 16-point margin, 54-38. The Blazers then never looked back, capturing their first title since joining the league in 1998.

=== Awards ===
NCAA Season 76 men's basketball champions
Benilde Blazers
First title

- Most Valuable Player: Jojo Manalo (Perpetual Altas)
- Mythical Five:
  - Jojo Manalo (Perpetual Altas)
  - Chester Tolomia (Perpetual Altas)
  - Christian Coronel (San Sebastian Stags)
  - Ernani Epondulan (JRU Heavy Bombers)
  - Orlan Tama (Letran Knights)
- Rookie of the Year: Alejandro Magpayo (Benilde Blazers)

== Juniors' tournament ==
=== Elimination round ===
The Letran Squires finished the elimination round undefeated and advanced to the Finals outright, with the twice-to-beat advantage.

=== Finals ===
October 9

Letran Squires	61–75	Mapua Red Robins

Rizal Memorial Coliseum, Manila

October 11

Letran Squires	55–77	Mapua Red Robins
Scoring by half: 37–32, 18–45
Pts: Ronjay Enrile 16		Pts: Ryan Malig 26
Mapua wins series in two games

Rizal Memorial Coliseum, Manila

On Game 1, the Mapua Red Robins snapped Letran's 14-game winning streak to extend the series to a deciding Game 2.

On the deciding game, the Red Robins won the championship, sweeping the Finals against the Squires.

This would be the last championship by the Mapua Red Robins. The Mapua Technical High School was closed, and stopped competing in 2005. The Malayan High School of Science became Mapua's representative in the juniors' division, starting in 2008.

Preceded by Season 75 (1999)	NCAA basketball seasons Season 76 (2001)	Succeeded by Season 77 (2000)
