= Kainoa =

Kainoa is a given name. Notable people with the given name include:

- Kainoa Bailey (born 1995), American soccer player
- Kainoa Ballungay (born 2001), Filipino-American basketball player
- Kainoa Correa (born 1988), American baseball coach
- Kainoa Lloyd (born 1994), Canadian rugby union player

== See also ==
- Brian Kainoa Makoa McKnight Sr. (born 1969), American singer-songwriter
