= 2016 Letran Knights basketball team =

2016 Letran Knights men's basketball

Record
- Elims rank: #6
- Final rank: #6
- 2016 record: 9–9
- Head coach: Jeff Napa (1st season)
- Assistant coaches: Leo Pujante; Jay Agleron; Chico Manabat; Robert Joseph Guevarra
- Captain: Rey Nambatac (4th season)

The 2016 Letran Knights men's basketball team represented Colegio de San Juan de Letran in the 92nd season of the National Collegiate Athletic Association in the Philippines. The men's basketball tournament for the school year 2016-17 began on June 25, 2016, and the host school for the season was San Beda College.

The Knights, the Season 91 champions, finished the double round-robin eliminations at sixth place with 9 wins against 9 losses. The Knights missed the Final Four playoffs this season.

== Roster ==
Letran Knights roster
Players
Coaches

| Pos. | No. | Nat. | Name | Height | Year | High School |
|---|---|---|---|---|---|---|
| F | 1 | (Philippines) | Ular, Renato U. | 6'4" (1.93m) | 1st | Padapada National High School |
| G | 2 | (Philippines) | Pambid, Gay Lord Jap | 6'1" (1.85m) | 1st | – |
| F | 4 | (Israel) | Apreku, Felix Jr. | 6'4" (1.93m) | 3rd | PCU Dasmarinas |
| C | 5 | (Philippines) | Sollano, Jomari | 6'4" (1.93m) | 2nd | Clarencio Calagos Memorial School of Fisheries |
| G | 6 | (Philippines) | Nambatac, Rey Benedict C. (C) | 5'11" (1.8m) | 4th | Colegio de San Juan de Letran |
| G | 7 | (Philippines) | Balanza, Jerrick G. | 6'2" (1.88m) | 2nd | Colegio de San Juan de Letran |
| G | 8 | (Philippines) | Calvo, John Paul | 6'0" (1.83m) | 3rd | Hua Siong College of Iloilo |
| G | 10 | (Philippines) | Luib, McJour | 5'11" (1.8m) | 5th | Colegio de San Juan de Letran |
| G | 12 | (Philippines) | Bernabe, Maui Matthew | 5'9" (1.75m) | 2nd | University of the East |
| F | 12 | (Philippines) | De La Peña, Chrisantoni | 6'4" (1.93m) | 3rd | De La Salle Lipa |
| C | 15 | (Philippines) | Balagasay, Christian | 6'5" (1.96m) | 2nd | Northridge Montessori School |
| F | 18 | (Philippines) | Ambohot, Jeo | 6'5" (1.96m) | 1st | Agro Industrial Foundation College of the Philippines |
| G | 19 | (Philippines) | Quinto, Kier John | 6'0" (1.83m) | 3rd | Colegio de San Juan de Letran |
| G | 30 | (Philippines) | Sario, Marvin John Carlo | 5'11" (1.8m) | 1st | De La Salle Santiago Zobel School |
| F | 36 | (Philippines) | Caralipio, King Deniell | 6'3" (1.91m) | 1st | San Pedro High School |
| F | 45 | (Philippines) | Tiburcio, Julius | 6'3" (1.91m) | 1st | – |

Head coach

- Jeff Napa

Assistant coach(es)

- Leo Pujante
- Jay Agleron
- Chico Manabat
- Robert Joseph Guevarra

Team manager

- Manny Pacquiao
- Ricky Paulino

Legend

- (C) Team captain
- Injured

=== Depth chart ===
| Pos. | Starting 5 | Bench 1 | Bench 2 |
|---|---|---|---|
| C | Balagasay | Ambohot | De La Peña |
| PF | Sollano | Ular | Pambid |
| SF | Quinto | Apreku | Caralipio |
| SG | Nambatac | Balanza | Bernabe |
| PG | Luib | Calvo | Sario |

== Coaching changes ==
Barely a month after the Knights captured its 17th title, Letran team manager Ricky Paulino confirmed to Letran's school paper, The LANCE, that head coach Aldin Ayo left Letran to coach the De La Salle Green Archers in the UAAP. In the Knights' bonfire celebration, Ayo clarified that the move was not about the money and it was necessary, citing problems with his family and the business.

In March 2016, Letran officials formally named Jeff Napa as the new head coach for the Knights. Napa was hired days after he steered the National University Bullpups to a championship in the UAAP.

== Roster changes ==
The Knights lost two of its key players from the championship team, Mark Cruz and Kevin Racal, to graduation. Holdovers were Rey Nambatac, McJour Luib, Jom Sollano, JP Calvo and Bong Quinto. Tommy Gedaria, meanwhile, was originally in the roster but did not play this season due to ACL injury. Added to the roster were big men Ato Ular and Jeo Ambohot, transferees from Arellano University.

== Suspensions ==
- The NCAA Management Committee slapped a one-game suspension on Chris Dela Peña, Marco Sario, and Jerrick Balanza after a near-melee that occurred in the game between the Letran Knights and San Beda Red Lions. Balanza was suspended because of his second unsportsmanlike foul, while Dela Peña and Sario were suspended due to entering the court illegally.

== NCAA Season 92 games results ==
Elimination games were played in a double round-robin format. All games were aired on ABS-CBN Sports and Action.

| Date | Time | Opponent | Venue | Result | Record |
|---|---|---|---|---|---|
First round of eliminations
| Jun 25 | 2:00 p.m. | San Beda Red Lions | Mall of Asia Arena • Pasay | L 85–89 | 0–1 |
Game Highs: Points: Quinto – 23; Rebounds: Apreku – 13; Assists: Nambatac – 7
| Jun 28 | 12:00 p.m. | EAC Generals | Filoil Flying V Centre • San Juan | W 76–72 | 1–1 |
Game Highs: Points: Nambatac – 33; Rebounds: Luib – 10; Assists: Luib – 6
| Jul 1 | 2:00 p.m. | Benilde Blazers | Filoil Flying V Centre • San Juan | W 56–52 | 2–1 |
Game Highs: Points: Sollano – 16; Rebounds: Sollano – 9; Assists: Nambatac – 4
| Jul 14 | 4:00 p.m. | Arellano Chiefs | Filoil Flying V Centre • San Juan | W 89–79 | 3–1 |
Game Highs: Points: Nambatac – 22; Rebounds: Apreku – 17; Assists: Luib, Nambatac – 3
| Jul 19 | 12:00 p.m. | San Sebastian Stags | Filoil Flying V Centre • San Juan | W 90–77 | 4–1 |
Game Highs: Points: Nambatac – 40; Rebounds: Nambatac – 10; Assists: Calvo – 8
| Jul 22 | 12:00 p.m. | Perpetual Altas | Filoil Flying V Centre • San Juan | L 55–61 | 4–2 |
Game Highs: Points: Nambatac – 19; Rebounds: Nambatac – 8; Assists: Quinto – 5
| Jul 28 | 2:00 p.m. | JRU Heavy Bombers | Filoil Flying V Centre • San Juan | W 67–62 | 5–2 |
Game Highs: Points: Nambatac – 29; Rebounds: Sollano – 11; Assists: Quinto – 4
| Aug 5 | 12:00 p.m. | Lyceum Pirates | Filoil Flying V Centre • San Juan | L 72–75 | 5–3 |
Game Highs: Points: Nambatac – 22; Rebounds: Apreku – 11; Assists: Calvo – 7
| Aug 9 | 4:00 p.m. | Mapúa Cardinals | Filoil Flying V Centre • San Juan | L 75–79 | 5–4 |
Game Highs: Points: Quinto – 20; Rebounds: Balanza – 6; Assists: Balanza – 5
5th place after the 1st round (5 wins–4 losses)
Second round of eliminations
| Aug 18 | 4:00 p.m. | Lyceum Pirates | Filoil Flying V Centre • San Juan | L 66–68 | 5–5 |
Game Highs: Points: Nambatac – 24; Rebounds: Ambohot – 10; Assists: Balanza – 5
| Aug 23 | 2:00 p.m. | JRU Heavy Bombers | Filoil Flying V Centre • San Juan | L 68–75 | 5–6 |
Game Highs: Points: Nambatac – 19; Rebounds: Sollano – 10; Assists: Nambatac – 4
| Aug 26 | 2:00 p.m. | San Beda Red Lions | Filoil Flying V Centre • San Juan | L 71–83 | 5–7 |
Game Highs: Points: Sollano – 18; Rebounds: Sollano – 18; Assists: Balanza – 4
| Aug 30 | 4:00 p.m. | Benilde Blazers | Filoil Flying V Centre • San Juan | W 57–40 | 6–7 |
Game Highs: Points: Nambatac – 13; Rebounds: Apreku – 12; Assists: Nambatac – 4
| Sep 2 | 12:00 p.m. | San Sebastian Stags | Filoil Flying V Centre • San Juan | W 73–61 | 7–7 |
Game Highs: Points: Nambatac – 16; Rebounds: Apreku – 12; Assists: Quinto – 4
| Sep 6 | 12:00 p.m. | Perpetual Altas | Filoil Flying V Centre • San Juan | W 69–63 | 8–7 |
Game Highs: Points: Nambatac – 26; Rebounds: Sollano – 8; Assists: Calvo – 3
| Sep 9 | 4:00 p.m. | Arellano Chiefs | Filoil Flying V Centre • San Juan | L 74–83 | 8–8 |
Game Highs: Points: Nambatac – 28; Rebounds: Sollano – 12; Assists: Quinto – 3
| Sep 13 | 4:00 p.m. | Mapúa Cardinals | Filoil Flying V Centre • San Juan | L 72–77 | 8–9 |
Game Highs: Points: Nambatac – 19; Rebounds: Apreku – 11; Assists: Luib – 3
| Sep 22 | 4:00 p.m. | EAC Generals | Filoil Flying V Centre • San Juan | W 93–87^{OT} | 9–9 |
Game Highs: Points: Sollano – 21; Rebounds: Sollano – 12; Assists: Calvo – 7
Sixth place at 9 wins–9 losses (4 wins–5 losses in the 2nd round)

Times listed above are in UTC+08:00

Source: Pong Ducanes, Imperium Technology
