= Miguel Corteza =

Filipino basketball player (born 1998)

No. 0 – Bataan Risers
- Position: Power forward / small forward
- League: MPBL

Personal information
- Born: February 23, 1998 (age 28) Silay, Negros Occidental, Philippines
- Listed height: 6 ft 4 in (1.93 m)

Career information
- High school: Bacolod Tay Tung High School (Bacolod)
- College: De La Salle; Benilde
- PBA draft: 2024: 2nd round, 20th overall pick
- Drafted by: Rain or Shine Elasto Painters
- Playing career: 2024–present

Career history
- 2024: Pampanga Giant Lanterns
- 2024: Marikina Shoemasters
- 2024-2025: Blackwater Bossing
- 2025: Muntinlupa Cagers
- 2026: Meycauayan Marilao Gems
- 2026–present: Bataan Risers

Miguel Ives Gonzales Corteza (born February 23, 1998) is a Filipino professional basketball player for the Bataan Risers of the Maharlika Pilipinas Basketball League (MPBL). He played his collegiate career first with the De La Salle Green Archers in 2018 before moving to the Benilde Blazers in 2019.

During the PBA season 49 draft, he was selected by the Rain or Shine Elasto Painters with the 20th pick. His draft rights were later traded to Blackwater Bossing for a future second-round pick.

== High school ==
Corteza represented Bacolod Tay Tung High School in the National Basketball Training Center (NBTC) Bacolod leg in 2017. However, his school was upset by University of St. La Salle in the regional finals.

=== PBA Young Stars (2014) ===
Corteza was a part of PBA Young Stars under Tay Tung High School in 2014. He played center when the team beat the West Negros University, scoring 14 points, 10 rebounds, and 8 assists to completely dominate the game.

=== NBTC (2015–2017) ===
In NBTC, Corteza played for the Tay Tung Thunderbolts and contributed in the basketball scene in Negros Occidental. He also played for Team Bacolod in the 3x3 Batang Pinoy National Finals and won the title with SJ Belangel and Jesmar Pedrosa.

== College career ==
=== De La Salle Green Archers ===
Corteza was recruited to De La Salle Green Archers in 2018. However, he left the Green Archers after one year at the same time with Aaron Waban, Jollo Go and Mark Dyke due to changes of staff and limited minutes in Season 80.

=== Benilde Blazers (2019–2023) ===
He then transferred to College of Saint Benilde. When asked about his career in Taft, Corteza said in an interview with Spin.ph, "I have no bad blood with La Salle. I still support them. Lasalyano pa rin naman ako." He served one year of residency before being eligible to play for the NCAA Season 97 in 2022.

Under both Coach Charles Tiu and TY Tang, Corteza was quick to be one of the main contributors of the Blazers, averaging 8.7 points and 5.5 rebounds but the team failed to secure a semifinal slot in Season 97. Corteza's consistent performance made him known in the collegiate scene in NCAA Season 98. He had 18 points, three rebounds, and three assists in a win over the San Sebastian Stags to start the season 2–0.

They got their third straight win against the UPHSD Altas in which he had 15 points and seven rebounds. Against the Letran Knights, he had 18 points and seven rebounds, but lost the ball in the last eleven seconds of the game, leading to their first loss of the season.

In a win over the Mapúa Cardinals, he scored 22 points and also provided eight rebounds. In a rematch with the Stags, he had 18 points as the Blazers got back into the Final Four for the first time since 2002. Before the Final Four, he sprained his right ankle, but he was able to play through it. In their Final Four match against the San Beda Red Lions, he only scored seven points, but grabbed 12 rebounds as the Blazers returned to the Finals for the first time in 20 years.

In the Finals, they faced the defending champions, the Letran Knights. In Game 1, he scored 18 points, but he and his teammates suffered cramps throughout the games and they lost. He bounced back in Game 2 with 21 points, 10 rebounds, and four assists, and the Blazers forced a do-or-die Game 3. The Blazers though, couldn't get the win in Game 3, and Letran got its third straight championship. He averaged 17.67 points, 6.3 rebounds, and 1.0 steals in the Finals.

To begin his senior season, he led with a game-high 21 points alongside four rebounds and five blocks in a loss to the Lyceum Pirates. He scored 21 points again in a win over the JRU Heavy Bombers. He then had a double-double of 14 points and 11 rebounds in a loss to San Beda. However, they started the season 1–3. In a game against the EAC Generals, he had 15 points and six rebounds before he injured his ankle in the last two minutes of that game. Despite the injury, he was able to play in the next game, and nearly get a double-double with 12 points and nine rebounds. They got to fourth place in the standings with a win over the Cardinals in which he had 17 points and nine rebounds. Then they moved up to third place in another game against JRU in which he had 18 points and five rebounds. In the Final Four, they were defeated by the Cardinals. They finished third place in the tournament overall by beating Lyceum. In his final game, he had 14 points.

== Professional career ==
=== Pampanga Giant Lanterns (2024) ===
In February 2024, Corteza was listed in the lineup for the Maharlika Pilipinas Basketball League's Pampanga Giant Lanterns. He made his professional debut in the 2024 Preseason Invitational in General Santos, where Pampanga won the preseason championship.

=== Marikina Shoemasters (2024) ===
In June 2024, Corteza was traded to the Marikina Shoemasters for Joe Gomez de Llaño.

=== Blackwater Bossing (2024–2025) ===
He was drafted 20th overall pick by the Rain or Shine Elasto Painters in the PBA season 49 draft. Shortly, ROS traded him to Blackwater Bossing in exchange for a future second-round pick.

Corteza then inked a one-year deal with the Blackwater Bossing.

== Career statistics ==
Legend
| GP | Games played | GS | Games started | MPG | Minutes per game |
| FG% | Field-goal percentage | 3P% | 3-point field-goal percentage | FT% | Free-throw percentage |
| RPG | Rebounds per game | APG | Assists per game | SPG | Steals per game |
| BPG | Blocks per game | PPG | Points per game | **Bold** | Career high |

=== Maharlika Pilipinas Basketball League (MPBL) ===
Season-by-season averages

| Year | Team | GP | GS | MPG | FG% | 3P% | FT% | RPG | APG | SPG | BPG | PPG |
|---|---|---|---|---|---|---|---|---|---|---|---|---|
| 2024 | Pampanga | 16 | 2 | **12.5** | 46.3 | **40** | **66.7** | **2.6** | 1.1 | **0.3** | 0.2 | **8.1** |
| 2024 | Marikina | **2** | **0** | 23.3 | **45.2** | 40 | 66.7 | 7 | **2** | 1.5 | **0** | 18 |

=== Philippine Basketball Association (PBA) ===
Legend
| GP | Games played | MPG | Minutes per game | FG% | Field-goal percentage |
| 3FG% | 3-point field-goal percentage | 4P% | 4-point field-goal percentage | FT% | Free-throw percentage |
| RPG | Rebounds per game | APG | Assists per game | SPG | Steals per game |
| BPG | Blocks per game | PPG | Points per game | **127** | Career high |

As of the end of 2024–25 season

Season-by-season averages

| Year | Team | GP | MPG | FG% | 3P% | 4P% | FT% | RPG | APG | SPG | BPG | PPG |
|---|---|---|---|---|---|---|---|---|---|---|---|---|
| 2024–25 | Blackwater | 14 | 4.8 | .417 | .200 | — | .800 | .8 | .2 | .1 | — | 2.1 |
| Career | | 14 | 4.8 | .417 | .200 | — | .800 | .8 | .2 | .1 | — | 2.1 |
