= Jywe Wen-yuh =

Fifth president of National Formosa University

Jywe Wen-yuh (Chinese: 覺文郁; pinyin: Jué Wényù) is the fifth president of National Formosa University.

Jywe is a specialist in optical precision measurement, machine tool calibration measurement and precise positioning stage design. During his doctoral study in University of Manchester Institute of Science and Technology (UMIST), he finished a measurement system for Ball Bar CNC machine tool which was marketed worldwide. He has served as the dean of Engineering College, the chairperson of Department of Automation Engineering and the President for Research and Development of NFU etc. In 2003, he established the Precision Machine Center of NFU and served as the director. He organized a research team in which members were composed of over 10 professors in the fields including design, manufacturing, control, solid mechanics, optics, electronics, etc. He is also the independent directors of two foundations and is currently running an intelligent machine flagship-type plan founded by Taiwan Government in the next four years.

== Qualifications ==
- Ph.D. Mechanical Engineering, University of Manchester Institute of Science and Technology, UK, 1992
- M.Eng. Mechanical Engineering, University of Manchester Institute of Science and Technology, UK, 1988
- B.Eng. Mechanical Engineering, National Taipei Institute of Technology, Taiwan, 1983

== Experience ==
- President, National Formosa University, Huwei, Yunlin, Taiwan (2013.08~present)
- Dean, College of Engineering, National Formosa University (2007.08~2013.07)
- Distinguished Professor, Department of Automation Engineering, National Formosa University (2004.02~present)
- Director, Preparatory Center for the Research and Services Headquarters, National Formosa University (2006.10~2007.07)
- Director, Precision Mechanical Device Developing Center, National Formosa University (2006.10~2007.07)
- Chair Professor, Department of Automation Engineering, National Formosa University (2004.10~2006.09)
- Dean, Research and Development Office, National Formosa University (2002.09~2005.10)
- Professor, Department of Automation Engineering, National Formosa University (2000.08~2004.01)
- Secretary General, Secretariat Office, National Huwei Institute of Technology, Huwei, Yunlin, Taiwan (1999.10~2002.07)
- Chairperson, Department of Automation Engineering, National Huwei Institute of Technology, Huwei, Yunlin, Taiwan (1997.08~1998.07)
- Chairperson, Department of Automation Engineering, National Yunlin Institute of Technology, Huwei, Yunlin, Taiwan (1995.08~1997.07)
- Computer Engineer, Acer Peripherals, Inc., Taiwan (1985.11~1986.11)

== Awards ==
- Distinguished Collaboration Award from Ministry of Science and Technology, Taiwan, 2017
- Research award from Machine Tool Engineering Foundation, Japan, 2016
- Academia-industry contribution Award for machinery industry from Association of Machinery Industry, Taiwan, 2016
- Distinguished Collaboration Award from Ministry of Science and Technology, Taiwan, 2014
- National Invention Gold Award from Ministry of Economic Affairs, 2012 and 2004
- The prize of technology transfer Award from Ministry of Science and Technology, Taiwan, 2012 and 2008
- 2nd National Industrial Innovation Award from Ministry of Economic Affairs, Taiwan, 2012
- The Academia prize of best researcher Award from Ministry of Science and Technology, Taiwan, since 2010
- The Academia contribution Award for industry economy from Ministry of Economic Affairs, Taiwan, 2009
- Distinguished Academia-industry Collaboration Award from Ministry of Science and Technology, Taiwan, 2007
- 3rd Elite in Nanotechnology Industry Award for Academia from Ministry of Economic Affairs, Taiwan, 2007
- Distinguished Engineering Professor Award from Chinese Institute of Engineers, Taiwan, 2006
- Best Engineering Paper Award from Chinese Institute of Engineers, Taiwan, 2005
