= Earl Medina =

Filipino basketball player

John Earl Medina
No. 21 – Adamson Soaring Falcons
- Position: Shooting guard
- League: UAAP

Personal information
- Born: February 21, 2006 (age 20) Philippines
- Listed height: 6 ft 2 in (1.88 m)

Career information
- High school: Adamson (Manila)
- College: Adamson

Career highlights
- AsiaBasket champion (2025 International); AsiaBasket Finals MVP (2025 International); UAAP juniors champion (2024)

John Earl Medina (born February 21, 2006) is a Filipino basketball player. He plays shooting guard in the UAAP for the college team Soaring Falcons of Adamson University. He helped lead the Baby Falcons to win the 2024 title. Prior to his current team, he played as a Batang Gilas in the FIBA Under-18 Asia Cup in Jordan.

== Early life ==
Medina first attended the Adamson University high school. He and his Baby Falcons teammates had several UAAP finals appearances.

Under head coach Mike Fermin, Medina, (future) MVP Mark Esperanza, awardee Tebol Garcia, and the rest of the Baby Falcons won the Season 86 crown over the NU-Nazareth Bullpups in Game 3 at the FilOil EcoOil Centre, San Juan.AdU seniors head coach Nash Racela identified Medina and other San Marcelino, Ermita players for their Season 88 campaign and beyond.

== Collegiate career ==
Medina contributed to the Soaring Falcons’ win over the UE Red Warriors in Season 88 of the UAAP.

== International ==
Medina played internationally under Batang Gilas.

He starred against New Zealand, shooting the lights out for 30 points, but the Gilas Youth lost the game held in Amman, Jordan on September 4, 2024.

== Awards and recognition ==
- 2025 Finals MVP, AsiaBasket
