= Vergeire =

Vergeire is a surname. Notable people with the surname include:

- Dong Vergeire (died 2013), Filipino basketball coach
- Maria Rosario Vergeire, Filipino physician
