= Mark Magsumbol =

Filipino basketball player

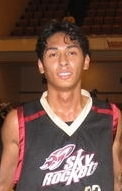
- Magsumbol in 2007

Personal information
- Born: March 20, 1980 (age 46) Calauag, Quezon, Philippines
- Listed height: 6 ft 2 in (1.88 m)

Career information
- College: Benilde
- PBA draft: 2006: 2nd round, 13th overall pick
- Drafted by: Sta. Lucia Realtors
- Playing career: 2006–2012
- Position: Small forward / shooting guard
- Number: 11

Career history
- 2006–2007: Sta. Lucia Realtors
- 2007–2008: Air21 Express
- 2010–2011: San Jose Skyrockets
- 2011–2012: Satria Muda BritAma Jakarta

Mark M. Magsumbol is a Filipino retired basketball player. Magsumbol has played in the Philippine Basketball Association, the Philippine Basketball League, National Basketball Conference, and for the American Basketball Association (ABA) team San Jose Skyrockets.

== Background ==
Magsumbol earned a Hotel and Restaurant Management degree at St. Benilde in 2001, but instead of applying what he learned in the classroom, decided to try his luck on the court. He never applied for the PBA draft and has played for four teams in the Philippine Basketball League, three teams in the National Basketball Conference, and a team in the Cebu Basketball Federation. Magsumbol also played for the Cebuana Lhuillier national squad.

Magsumbol previously played for the San Jose Skyrockets in the American Basketball Association (ABA) as an "import" in the US minors. He made his ABA debut, aged 25, by scoring 12 points, including 3-of-4 triples, in the Skyrockets’ 160-101 romp over the Tijuana Dragones at the San Jose Auditorium on Jan. 30, 2006. He arrived in the US on January 22, 2010.

Magsumbol was chosen to play for the Sky Rockets among 15 Filipino aspirants in a tryout conducted by coach Marc Joffe at the PhilSports Arena in Pasig in October 2009. Joffe arrived with team owner Kazuni Hasegawa from San Jose to check out Filipino players capable of playing in the ABA.

Magsumbol later joined the PBA. He was drafted by the Sta. Lucia Realtors. After SLR, he transferred to Air21 Express. He last played with M. Lhuillier Kwarta Padala Cebu Niños, a commercial team based in Cebu.
