= Kai Ballungay =

Filipino-American basketball player

No. 1 – Phoenix Super LPG Fuel Masters
- Position: Power forward / center
- League: PBA

Personal information
- Born: November 16, 2001 (age 24)
- Listed height: 6 ft 7 in (2.01 m)
- Listed weight: 215 lb (98 kg)

Career information
- High school: John C. Kimball (Tracy, California)
- College: Stanislaus State; Ateneo
- PBA draft: 2024: 1st round, 4th overall pick
- Drafted by: Phoenix Fuel Masters
- Playing career: 2024–present

Career history
- 2024–present: Phoenix Fuel Masters/Super LPG Fuel Masters

Career highlights
- PBA All-Rookie Team (2025); AsiaBasket champion (2023 Las Piñas); AsiaBasket MVP (2023 Las Piñas); AsiaBasket First Team (2023 Las Piñas); UAAP champion (2022)

Kainoa Bryson Ballungay (born November 16, 2001) is a Filipino-American professional basketball player for the Phoenix Super LPG Fuel Masters of the Philippine Basketball Association (PBA).

In high school, Ballungay played for the John C. Kimball High School Jaguars. To begin his college career, he played for the California State University, Stanislaus (Stanislaus State) Warriors before making the move to Ateneo de Manila University to play for the Blue Eagles for the remainder of his college career. He won a championship with the Blue Eagles in 2022 during UAAP Season 85.

In 2024, during the PBA season 49 draft, he was selected fourth overall by the Phoenix Fuel Masters. He made the PBA All-Rookie Team in his first year in the pro ranks.

He also represented the United States in the 2018 FIBA Under-17 Basketball World Cup.

== High school and college career ==
In high school, Ballungay played for John C. Kimball High School. He was part of the Filipino-American team that competed in the 2019 NBTC National Finals.

As a freshman, Ballungay began his collegiate career with the Stanislaus State Warriors. In the midst of the COVID-19 pandemic, he has thought about moving his collegiate career to the Philippines, which later came to fruition on July 26, 2021, when he transferred to the Ateneo Blue Eagles. He was part of the team that won the UAAP title in Season 85 (2022). On December 4, 2023, Ballungay announced his departure from Ateneo to pursue his entry into the professional ranks.

== Professional career ==
=== Phoenix Fuel Masters (2024–present) ===
On July 5, 2024, Ballungay declared for the PBA season 49 draft, where he was then selected fourth overall by the Phoenix Fuel Masters. He then signed a three-year deal with Phoenix on July 31. He was selected to the PBA All-Rookie Team in 2025.

== PBA career statistics ==
Legend
GP	Games played	MPG	Minutes per game	FG%	Field-goal percentage
3FG%	3-point field-goal percentage	4P%	4-point field-goal percentage	FT%	Free-throw percentage
RPG	Rebounds per game	APG	Assists per game	SPG	Steals per game
BPG	Blocks per game	PPG	Points per game	127	Career high

As of the end of 2025–26 season

=== Season-by-season averages ===
Year	Team	GP	MPG	FG%	3P%	4P%	FT%	RPG	APG	SPG	BPG	PPG
2024–25	Phoenix	31	22.9	.534	.231	.000	.612	6.0	.6	.5	.2	10.5
2025–26	Phoenix / Phoenix Super LPG	26	28.5	.539	.273	.000	.609	6.4	1.0	.6	.5	11.2
Career		57	25.5	.536	.250	.000	.610	6.2	.8	.5	.3	10.8

== Personal life ==
Kai's father, Miles Ballungay, is a Filipino from Hawaii while his grandmother comes from Ilocos Norte. On December 27, 2022, he married Bella Dahl.
