= 2023 AsiaBasket Las Piñas Championship =

Fifth tournament of FilBasket / AsiaBasket; second in 2023

Tournament details
- Country: Philippines
- City: Las Piñas
- Dates: July 21–30
- Teams: 10

Final positions
- Champions: Ateneo Blue Eagles (1st title)
- Runners-up: CSB Blazers
- Third place: Sanzar Pharmaceuticals
- Fourth place: Corsa Tires

The 2023 AsiaBasket Las Piñas Championship was the fifth tournament under AsiaBasket, the second under the AsiaBasket name, and the second of three tournaments held in 2023. The tournament began from July 21 to 30, 2023 at the Villar Coliseum in Las Piñas with 10 teams from both collegiate and professional clubs.

It is also the first tournament since Summer 2022 to be held in the Philippines as well as the first since Subic 2021 to feature an all-Filipino lineup. The league originally intended to use the original FilBasket moniker under these circumstances, but ultimately, the AsiaBasket name was still used.

The Ateneo Blue Eagles won the championship after defeating CSB Blazers at score 60–57 in the final tournament.

== Teams ==
Name	Locality	Head coach
Ateneo Blue Eagles	Quezon City	Tab Baldwin
CSB Blazers	Malate, Manila	Charles Tiu
Corsa Tires	—N/a	Monch Gavieres
FEU Tamaraws	Sampaloc, Manila	Denok Miranda
Letran Knights	Intramuros, Manila	Rensy Bajar
Pilipinas Aguilas	—N/a	Andrew Felix
Perpetual Altas	Las Piñas	Mike Saguiguit
San Beda Red Lions	Mendiola, Manila	Andre Santos
Sanzar Pharmaceuticals	Las Piñas	Egay Billones
Uratex	—N/a	Carmelo Lim

== Format ==
The ten teams are divided into two groups of five, from there each team plays one game against all other teams from the same group, with each team playing four games.

The single-elimination knockout stage was expanded to now have the top four teams from each group, instead of the top. The first round is a crossover quarterfinals, where one team from both groups is matched against one another. The winning teams advance to the next round. In the semifinals, the losing teams advance to a third place game.

== Group stage ==
=== Group A ===
Pos	Team	Pld	W	L	PF	PA	PD	PCT	Qualification	ADMU	COR	URA	CSB	UPHSD
1	Ateneo Blue Eagles	4	4	0	346	297	+49	1.000	Quarterfinals	—	77–76	96–63	85–78	88–80
2	Corsa Tires	4	2	2	316	306	+10	.500	Quarterfinals	76–77	—	76–73	89–78	75–78
3	Uratex	4	2	2	321	346	−25	.500	Quarterfinals	63–96	73–76	—	97–93	88–81
4	Benilde Blazers	4	1	3	332	342	−10	.250	Quarterfinals	78–85	78–89	93–97	—	71–83
5	Perpetual Altas	4	1	3	310	334	−24	.250		80–88	78–75	81–88	83–71	—

Source: Filbasket (via Genius Sports)
Rules for classification: 1) Win percentage; 2) Head-to-head record; 3) Head-to-head point differential; 4) Head-to-head points scored; 5) Overall point differential; 6) Overall points scored.

July 21	CSB Blazers	78–89	Corsa Tires
1:00 p.m	Scoring by quarter: 27–26, 17–30, 13–14, 21–19
	Pts: Gozum 18; Rebs: Mara, Gozum 7 Asts: Carlos 6	Boxscore	Pts: Sanchez 21; Rebs: Sanchez 12; Asts: Estacio 6

July 21	Ateneo Blue Eagles	96–63	Uratex
5:00 p.m	Scoring by quarter: 17–17, 28–11, 25–18, 26–17
	Pts: Ballungay 15; Rebs: Ballungay 15; Asts: Espinosa 5	Boxscore	Pts: Nzeusseu 23; Rebs: Adeogun 9 Asts: Bragais 4

July 22	Perpetual Altas	78–75	Corsa Tires
3:00 p.m	Scoring by quarter: 18–27, 20–22, 23–17, 17–9
	Pts: Ferreras 21; Rebs: Boral, Nitura 8 Asts: Boral, Nitura 4	Boxscore	Pts: Sanchez, Anderson 18; Rebs: Ndong 16; Asts: Sanchez 7

July 22	Ateneo Blue Eagles	85–78	CSB Blazers
7:00 p.m	Scoring by quarter: 27–17, 20–17, 18–18, 20–26
	Pts: Ballungay 19; Rebs: Obasa 12; Asts: Brown 3	Boxscore	Pts: Oczon 17; Rebs: Oczon 8 Asts: Nayve 6

July 23	Uratex	88–81	Perpetual Altas
3:00 p.m	Scoring by quarter: 19–19, 24–21, 24–23, 21–18
	Pts: Adeogun 27; Rebs: Nzeusseu 18; Asts: Gil 5	Boxscore	Pts: Roque 16; Rebs: Abis 7 Asts: Razon 8

July 23	Corsa Tires	76–77	Ateneo Blue Eagles
7:00 p.m	Scoring by quarter: 13–15, 23–20, 19–25, 21–17
	Pts: Sanchez 25; Rebs: Ndong 15; Asts: Anderson, Ynot 3	Boxscore	Pts: Ballungay 17; Rebs: Obasa 9 Asts: Espinosa 4

July 24	Uratex	97–93	CSB Blazers
5:00 p.m	Scoring by quarter: 29–27, 14–24, 29–22, 25–20
	Pts: Nzeusseu 29; Rebs: Nzeusseu, Adeogun 9 Asts: Gil 6	Boxscore	Pts: Gozum 19; Rebs: Gozum 5 Asts: Nayve 8

July 24	Perpetual Altas	80–88	Ateneo Blue Eagles
7:00 p.m	Scoring by quarter: 16–30, 20–22, 27–24, 17–12
	Pts: Nitura 24; Rebs: Pagaran 8 Asts: Nitura 7	Boxscore	Pts: Ballungay 19; Rebs: Chiu 10; Asts: Espinosa 8

July 26	Corsa Tires	76–73	Uratex
1:00 p.m	Scoring by quarter: 19–19, 20–19, 16–14, 21–21
	Pts: Anderson 18; Rebs: Ndong 20; Asts: Sanchez 8	Boxscore	Pts: Adeogun 20; Rebs: Adeogun 17; Asts: Vidal 4

July 26	CSB Blazers	83–71	Perpetual Altas
5:00 p.m	Scoring by quarter: 18–17, 21–23, 23–14, 21–17
	Pts: Oczon 23; Rebs: Corteza, Gozum 10; Asts: Oczon 6	Boxscore	Pts: Roque 16; Rebs: Nitura 13; Asts: Nitura 10

=== Group B ===
Pos	Team	Pld	W	L	PF	PA	PD	PCT	Qualification	FEU	SAN	CSJL	SBU	PIL
1	FEU Tamaraws	4	4	0	332	274	+58	1.000	Quarterfinals	—	81–75	84–74	80–51	87–74
2	Sanzar Pharmaceuticals	4	2	2	303	294	+9	.500 (Note: Sanzar wins tiebreaker over Letran by head-to-head victory.)	Quarterfinals	75–81	—	82–80	74–58	72–75
3	Letran Knights	4	2	2	350	326	+24	.500	Quarterfinals	74–84	80–82	—	85–84	111–76
4	San Beda Red Lions	4	1	3	286	327	−41	.250 (Note: San Beda wins tiebreaker over Pilipinas by head-to-head victory.)	Quarterfinals	51–80	58–74	84–85	—	93–88
5	Pilipinas Aguilas	4	1	3	313	363	−50	.250		74–87	75–72	76–111	88–93	—

Source: Filbasket (via Genius Sports)
Rules for classification: 1) Win percentage; 2) Head-to-head record; 3) Head-to-head point differential; 4) Head-to-head points scored; 5) Overall point differential; 6) Overall points scored.
Notes:

July 21	Sanzar Pharmaceuticals	75–81	FEU Tamaraws
3:00 p.m	Scoring by quarter: 19–18, 18–25, 16–16, 22–22
	Pts: Odou 28; Rebs: Odou 24; Asts: Torres 4	Boxscore	Pts: Torres 24; Rebs: Fatty 14; Asts: Anonuevo 7

July 21	San Beda Red Lions	84–85	Letran Knights
3:00 p.m	Scoring by quarter: 29–26, 29–22, 16–17, 10–20
	Pts: Sajonia 25; Rebs: Tolentino 12; Asts: Alloso 6	Boxscore	Pts: Reyson 19; Rebs: three players 8 Asts: Reyson 8

July 22	Pilipinas Aguilas	74–87	FEU Tamaraws
1:00 p.m	Scoring by quarter: 29–16, 14–22, 20–25, 11–24
	Pts: Ramirez 29; Rebs: Toba 12; Asts: Ramirez 4	Boxscore	Pts: Torres 21; Rebs: Fatty 11; Asts: Sleat, Tempra 5

July 22	San Beda Red Lions	58–74	Sanzar Pharmaceuticals
5:00 p.m	Scoring by quarter: 17–11, 20–27, 16–17, 5–19
	Pts: Sajonia 12; Rebs: Lina 7 Asts: Calimag 3	Boxscore	Pts: Odou 32; Rebs: Odou, Kone 17; Asts: Kawamura, Torres 3

July 23	Letran Knights	111–76	Pilipinas Aguilas
1:00 p.m	Scoring by quarter: 27–16, 33–23, 28–14, 23–23
	Pts: Monje 29; Rebs: Santos 14; Asts: Reyson 9	Boxscore	Pts: Ramirez 16; Rebs: Toba 10; Asts: Enguio 3

July 23	FEU Tamaraws	80–51	San Beda Red Lions
5:00 p.m	Scoring by quarter: 8–15, 24–9, 25–14, 23–13
	Pts: Sleat 15; Rebs: Fatty 12; Asts: Alforque 5	Boxscore	Pts: Calimag 11; Rebs: Tolentino 8 Asts: Alloso 5

July 24	Pilipinas Aguilas	88–93	San Beda Red Lions
1:00 p.m	Scoring by quarter: 14–17, 25–20, 27–26, 22–20
	Pts: Enguio 21; Rebs: Eugene 18; Asts: Daez, Enguio 4	Boxscore	Pts: Calimag 26; Rebs: Calimag 13; Asts: Lecciones 6

July 24	Letran Knights	80–82	Sanzar Pharmaceuticals
3:00 p.m	Scoring by quarter: 26–20, 22–25, 22–15, 10–22
	Pts: Reyson 24; Rebs: Javillonar 10; Asts: Reyson, Tolentino 10	Boxscore	Pts: Odou 23; Rebs: Kone 18; Asts: Torres 11

July 26	Sanzar Pharmaceuticals	72–75	Pilipinas Aguilas
3:00 p.m	Scoring by quarter: 17–19, 17–22, 21–22, 17–12
	Pts: Odou 30; Rebs: Kone 22; Asts: Ondoa 3	Boxscore	Pts: Ramirez 23; Rebs: Eugene 12; Asts: Ramirez, Caldozo 3

July 26	FEU Tamaraws	81–74	Letran Knights
7:00 p.m	Scoring by quarter: 21–13, 18–23, 27–18, 18–20
	Pts: Anonuevo 14; Rebs: Fatty 18; Asts: Sleat 4	Boxscore	Pts: Reyson 20; Rebs: Santos 15; Asts: Reyson 9

== Knockout stage ==
The top four teams from the elimination round advanced to the quarterfinals. The winners advanced to a semifinal. The winners advanced to a one-game final while the losers contested in the third-place play-off game.

Quarterfinals
A1	Ateneo	79
B4	San Beda	57
B2	Sanzar (OT)	82
A3	Uratex	79
B1	FEU	69
A4	Benilde	75
A2	Corsa	94
B3	Letran	77

Semifinals
A1	Ateneo	89
B2	Sanzar	79
A4	Benilde	76
A2	Corsa	70

Finals
A1	Ateneo	60
A4	Benilde	57
Third place
B2	Sanzar	95
A2	Corsa	88

=== Quarterfinals ===
July 27	Sanzar Pharmaceuticals	82–79(OT)	Uratex
1:00 p.m.	Scoring by quarter: 21–18, 24–21, 15–23, 15–13, Overtime: 7–4
	Pts: Kawamura, Odou 17; Rebs: Odou 16; Asts: Odou 6	Boxscore	Pts: Adeogun 25; Rebs: Nzeusseu 13; Asts: Bragais 6

July 27	Ateneo Blue Eagles	79–57	San Beda Red Lions
3:00 p.m.	Scoring by quarter: 24–23, 19–9, 20–9, 16–16
	Pts: Ballungay 17; Rebs: Ballungay, Obasa 8 Asts: Credo, Gomez 4	Boxscore	Pts: Sajonia 12; Rebs: Calimag, Tolentino 8 Asts: Peregrina 3

July 27	FEU Tamaraws	69–75	CSB Blazers
5:00 p.m.	Scoring by quarter: 17–17, 17–17, 19–27, 16–14
	Pts: Anonuevo 17; Rebs: Fatty 13; Asts: Alforque, Sleat 4	Boxscore	Pts: Oczon 18; Rebs: Gozum 11; Asts: Oczon, Nayve 6

July 27	Corsa Tires	94–77	Letran Knights
7:00 p.m.	Scoring by quarter: 32–19, 28–22, 16–17, 18–19
	Pts: Sanchez 25; Rebs: Ynot 12; Asts: Sanchez 5	Boxscore	Pts: Reyson 23; Rebs: Javillonar, Guarino 7 Asts: Reyson 8

=== Semifinals ===
July 28	CSB Blazers	76–70	Corsa Tires
4:00 p.m.	Scoring by quarter: 19–22, 18–14, 23–17, 16–17
	Pts: three players 13; Rebs: Turco 13; Asts: Oczon, Sangco 4	Boxscore	Pts: Anderson 17; Rebs: Ndong 12; Asts: Macatangay, Estacio 2

July 28	Ateneo Blue Eagles	89–79	Sanzar Pharmaceuticals
6:00 p.m.	Scoring by quarter: 31–19, 22–17, 17–26, 19–17
	Pts: Ballungay 17; Rebs: Chiu, Obasa 7 Asts: Espinosa 5	Boxscore	Pts: Odou 7 Rebs: Kone 12; Asts: Torres 6

=== Third place game ===
July 30	Sanzar Pharmaceuticals	95–88	Corsa Tires
4:00 p.m.	Scoring by quarter: 23–17, 22–26, 26–15, 24–30
	Pts: Odou 21; Rebs: Odou 18; Asts: Torres 9	Boxscore	Pts: Ynot 18; Rebs: Ynot 12; Asts: Ynot 9

=== Finals ===
July 30	Ateneo Blue Eagles	60–57	CSB Blazers
6:30 p.m.	Scoring by quarter: 21–15, 12–14, 17–16, 10–12
	Pts: Espinosa 15; Rebs: Obasa 16; Asts: Quitevis 5	Boxscore	Pts: Gozum 12; Rebs: Oczon 8 Asts: Oczon 6

== Statistics ==
=== Individual statistical leaders ===
Category	Player	Team	Statistic
Points per game	Adeshokan Odou	Sanzar Pharmaceuticals	24.0
Rebounds per game	Salomon Kone	Sanzar Pharmaceuticals	16.6
Assists per game	Kurt Spencer Reyson	Letran Knights	7.8
Steals per game	Xyrus Torres; Edrian Ramirez	FEU Tamaraws; Pilipinas Aguilas	2.8
Blocks per game	Mouhammed Fatty	FEU Tamaraws	2.6
FG%	Ola Adeogun	Uratex	59.7%
FT%	Edrian Ramirez	Pilipinas Aguilas	85.7%
3FG%	Kobe Monje	Letran Knights	85.7%

=== Team statistical leaders ===
Category	Team	Statistic
Points per game	Letran Knights	85.4
Rebounds per game	FEU Tamaraws	58.0
Assists per game	Letran Knights	23.2
Steals per game	Letran Knights	11.8
Blocks per game	Letran Knights	5.4
Turnovers per game	Uratex	19.8

== Awards ==
The individual league awards was given before the Finals of the 2023 AsiaBasket Las Piñas Championship at the Villar Coliseum in Las Piñas.

Awards	Winner (s)	Team
Most Valuable Player	Kainoa Ballungay	Ateneo Blue Eagles
All-AsiaBasket First Team	Justine Sanchez	Corsa Tires
All-AsiaBasket First Team	Adeshokan Odou	Sanzar Pharmaceuticals
All-AsiaBasket First Team	Kainoa Ballungay	Ateneo Blue Eagles
All-AsiaBasket First Team	Tony Ynot	Corsa Tires
All-AsiaBasket First Team	Will Gozum	CSB Blazers
All-AsiaBasket Second Team	Xyrus Torres	FEU Tamaraws
All-AsiaBasket Second Team	Ian Torres	Sanzar Pharmaceuticals
All-AsiaBasket Second Team	Miguel Oczon	CSB Blazers
All-AsiaBasket Second Team	Kevin Santos	Letran Knights
All-AsiaBasket Second Team	Joseph Obasa	Ateneo Blue Eagles
Coach of the Tournament	Tab Baldwin	Ateneo Blue Eagles
