= John C. Kimball High School =

Location
- 3200 Jaguar Run; Tracy, California 95377; United States
- 37°43′59″N 121°28′29″W

Information
- Type: Public
- Established: 2009
- School district: Tracy Unified School District
- Principal: Amanda Bowman
- Teaching staff: 67.30 (FTE)
- Grades: 9-12
- Enrollment: 1,587 (2024-2025)
- Student to teacher ratio: 23.58
- Campus: Rural
- Campus size: 55 acres (220,000 m^{2})
- Colors: Blue; Orange
- Mascot: Jaguar
- Website: Kimball High School

John C. Kimball High School (KHS) is an American public high school in Tracy, California, south of 11th Street on Lammers Road. Kimball High School is the third high school in the Tracy Unified School District. The first day of school was August 12, 2009 with an enrollment of 1,472 students.

== School facilities ==
The school sits on a 55-acre site on the east side of Lammers Road, south of 11th Street. It was designed by the Urban Ernst Design Group and constructed by F&H Construction. The school has eight single-story classroom buildings, a library, a 400-seat performing arts center (Named in 2023 the Geri Neylan Performing Arts Theatre, in honor of longtime Kimball High drama teacher Geri Neylan), two gymnasiums, a 4,000-seat stadium, a swimming pool, and athletic fields.
