= Jielo Razon =

Filipino basketball player

No. 9 – Caloocan Batang Kankaloo
- Position: Point guard
- League: MPBL

Personal information
- Born: June 9, 1999 (age 27)
- Listed height: 5 ft 11 in (1.80 m)

Career information
- High school: Perpetual (Las Piñas)
- College: Perpetual
- PBA draft: 2024: undrafted

Career history
- 2023–2024: Parañaque Patriots
- 2024–2025: TNT Tropang Giga/5G
- 2026-present: Caloocan Batang Kankaloo

Career highlights
- PBA champion (2024–25 Commissioner's); MPBL All-Star (2024)

Jielo Razon (born June 9, 1999) is a Filipino professional basketball player who played for the Caloocan Batang Kankaloo of the Maharlika Pilipinas Basketball League (MPBL).

Razon spent his entire college career with the Perpetual Altas. He then played for the Parañaque Patriots of the Maharlika Pilipinas Basketball League (MPBL) from 2023 to 2024, where he was selected as an all-star in the latter.

In 2024, he went undrafted in the PBA season 49 draft, but went on to sign a one-year deal with the TNT Tropang Giga.

== High school and college career ==
Razon played for the University of Perptual Help System DALTA (UPHSD) High School Junior Altas in the juniors' tournament of the National Collegiate Athletic Association (NCAA). Razon declined offers to play for other schools in college, remaining at UPHSD to play with their senior team, the Altas, in college. Razon and the Altas made it to the semifinals in NCAA Season 97 (2022) Razon played his final game for Perpetual in NCAA Season 99 (2023) scoring a career high.

== Professional career ==
=== Parañaque Patriots (2023–2024) ===
In 2023, before his final year with Perpetual, he joined the Parañaque Patriots of the Maharlika Pilipinas Basketball League as a Special Guest License player. He returned in 2024 as a full-time player, where he was declared an all-star for the 2024 MPBL All-Star Game and led the Patriots to their first playoff appearance and first playoff win since 2018. He averaged 12.7 points, 5.7 rebounds, 4.5 assists, and 1.5 steals per game in his second season with Parañaque.

=== TNT Tropang Giga/5G (2024–2025) ===
Razon was part of the player pool for the PBA season 49 draft, but didn't get picked, leaving him undrafted. Despite that, he joined a training camp with the TNT Tropang Giga after receiving a message from agent Danny Espiritu and team manager Jojo Lastimosa. He then signed a one-year deal on December 4, 2024, and made his PBA debut two days later for the 2024–25 PBA Commissioner's Cup.

On September 25, 2025, Razon was released by the team.

== Career statistics ==
=== PBA ===
Legend
GP	Games played	MPG	Minutes per game	FG%	Field-goal percentage
3FG%	3-point field-goal percentage	4P%	4-point field-goal percentage	FT%	Free-throw percentage
RPG	Rebounds per game	APG	Assists per game	SPG	Steals per game
BPG	Blocks per game	PPG	Points per game	**127**	Career high

As of the end of 2024–25 season

==== Season-by-season averages ====
Year	Team	GP	MPG	FG%	3P%	4P%	FT%	RPG	APG	SPG	BPG	PPG
2024–25	TNT	22	6.6	.289	.273	.222	.500	1.4	.6	.2	.0	1.7
Career		22	6.6	.289	.273	.222	.500	1.4	.6	.2	.0	1.7

=== MPBL ===
Legend
GP	Games played	GS	Games started	MPG	Minutes per game
FG%	Field-goal percentage	3P%	3-point field-goal percentage	FT%	Free-throw percentage
RPG	Rebounds per game	APG	Assists per game	SPG	Steals per game
BPG	Blocks per game	PPG	Points per game	**Bold**	Career high

==== Season-by-season averages ====
As of the end of 2024 season

Year	Team	GP	GS	MPG	FG%	3P%	FT%	RPG	APG	SPG	BPG	PPG
2023	Parañaque	21	12	24.8	**.419**	**.327**	.718	4.3	4.4	**1.6**	**.1**	11.5
2024	Parañaque	**31**	**25**	**27.7**	.372	.251	**.798**	**5.7**	**4.5**	1.5	**.1**	**12.7**
