= CJ Payawal =

Filipino-American basketball player

No. 4 – Cebu Greats
- Position: Small forward
- League: MPBL

Personal information
- Born: June 2, 1997 (age 29) Gurnee, Illinois
- Listed height: 6 ft 5 in (1.96 m)
- Listed weight: 185 lb (84 kg)

Career information
- High school: Warren (Gurnee, Illinois)
- College: Des Moines Area CC (2015–2017); Illinois–Springfield (2017–2019); St. Xavier (2019–2020); UE (2020–2023)
- PBA draft: 2024: 3rd round, 28th overall pick
- Drafted by: Phoenix Fuel Masters
- Playing career: 2024–present

Career history
- 2024: Valenzuela Classic
- 2024–2025: TNT Tropang Giga/5G
- 2026–present: Cebu Greats

Career highlights
- 2× PBA champion (2024 Governors', 2024–25 Commissioner's)

Calvin Justus Payawal (born June 2, 1997) is a Filipino-American professional basketball player for the Cebu Greats of the Maharlika Pilipinas Basketball League (MPBL).

Born in Gurnee, Illinois, Payawal played for four different schools throughout his college career, beginning at Des Moines Area Community College and culminating at the University of the East.

Payawal made his professional debut in 2024 when he joined the Valenzuela Classic of the Maharlika Pilipinas Basketball League (MPBL) before getting drafted by the Phoenix Fuel Masters in the PBA season 49 draft. However, he didn't suit up for Phoenix, instead signing a deal with the TNT Tropang Giga.

== College career ==
Payawal began his college career with the Des Moines Area Community College (DMACC) Bears in 2015 as a redshirt, where he played for two seasons before transferring to the University of Illinois Springfield in 2017, playing for the Prairie Stars for another two seasons. For his senior year in 2019, he played for the St. Xavier Cougars.

In 2020, Payawal joined the University of the East (UE) Red Warriors after he was recruited by coach Jack Santiago. He played his one-and-done year with UE in UAAP Season 85 in 2022.

== Professional career ==
=== Valenzuela Classic (2024) ===
In 2024, Payawal entered the professional ranks in the Maharlika Pilipinas Basketball League with the Valenzuela Classic. In his 18 games with the team, he averaged 10.9 points and 6.1 rebounds while also shooting .486 from the field.

=== TNT Tropang Giga/5G (2024–2025) ===
On July 14, 2024, during the PBA season 49 draft, Payawal was drafted by the Phoenix Fuel Masters in the third round with the 28th pick. However, he ended up getting released by Phoenix and, on July 19, suited up for a tryout with the TNT Tropang Giga. On July 29, he signed a one-year deal with TNT.

On September 25, 2025, Payawal was released by the team.

== Career statistics ==
=== PBA ===
Legend
GP	Games played	MPG	Minutes per game	FG%	Field-goal percentage
3FG%	3-point field-goal percentage	4P%	4-point field-goal percentage	FT%	Free-throw percentage
RPG	Rebounds per game	APG	Assists per game	SPG	Steals per game
BPG	Blocks per game	PPG	Points per game	**127**	Career high

As of the end of 2024–25 season

==== Season-by-season averages ====
Year	Team	GP	MPG	FG%	3P%	4P%	FT%	RPG	APG	SPG	BPG	PPG
2024–25	TNT	20	5.8	.295	.261	.000	.667	1.5	.2	.2	.1	1.8
Career		20	5.8	.295	.261	.000	.667	1.5	.2	.2	.1	1.8

=== MPBL ===
Legend
GP	Games played	MPG	Minutes per game
FG%	Field-goal percentage	3P%	3-point field-goal percentage	FT%	Free-throw percentage
RPG	Rebounds per game	APG	Assists per game	SPG	Steals per game
BPG	Blocks per game	PPG	Points per game	**Bold**	Career high

As of the end of 2024 season

==== Season-by-season averages ====
Year	Team	GP	GS	MPG	FG%	3P%	FT%	RPG	APG	SPG	BPG	PPG
2024	Valenzuela	18	6	19.6	.486	.342	.633	6.1	1.1	.7	.1	10.9

== 3x3 career ==
Following his single season with UE, Payawal joined the Manila Chooks 3x3 team, competing in various FIBA 3x3 competitions throughout 2023.
