= CJ Cansino =

Filipino basketball player (born 1999)

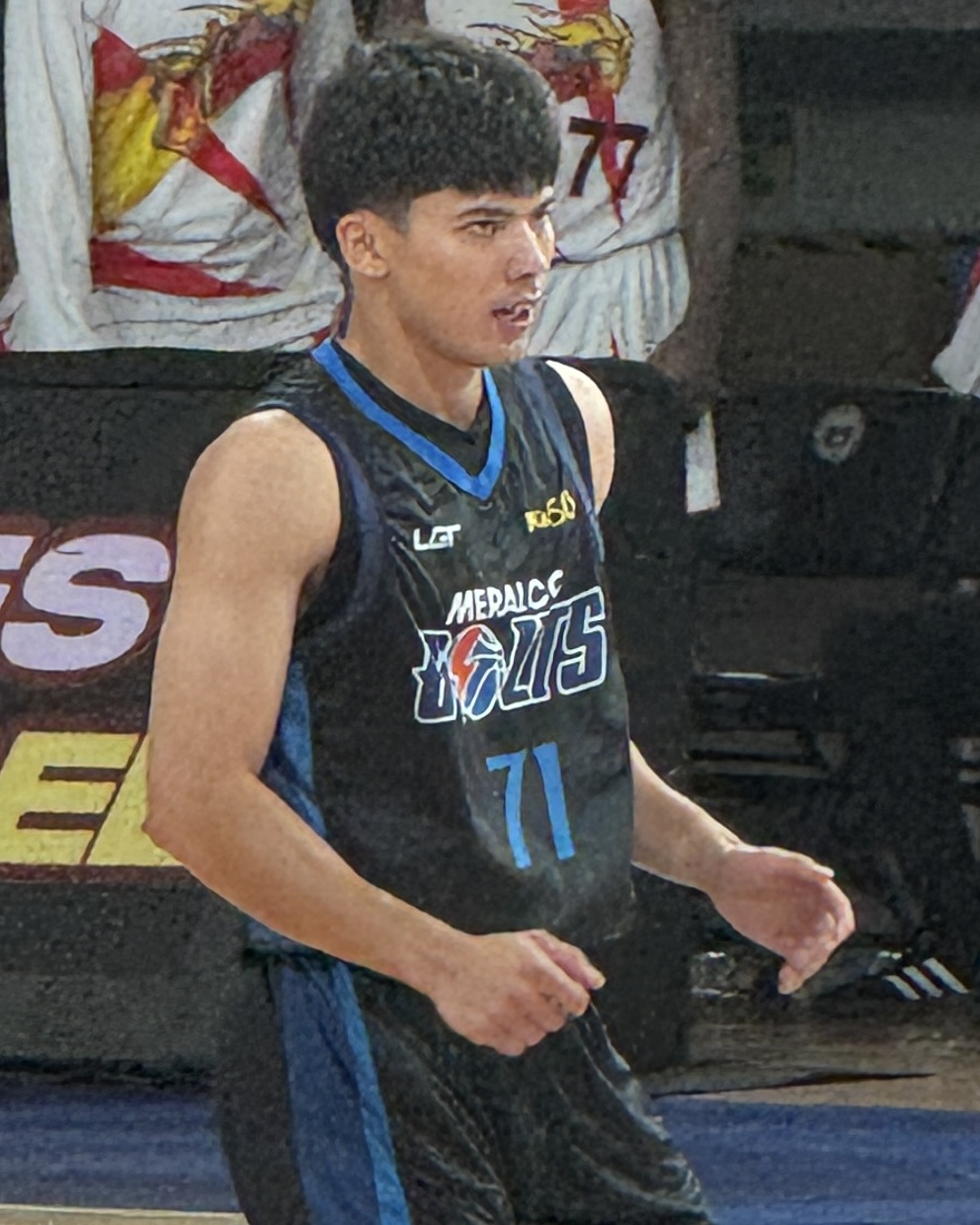
- Cansino with the Meralco Bolts in 2026

No. 71 – Meralco Bolts
- Position: Shooting guard
- League: PBA

Personal information
- Born: October 27, 1999 (age 27)
- Listed height: 6 ft 2 in (1.88 m)

Career information
- College: UST (2018–2020); UP (2021–2023)
- PBA draft: 2024: 1st round, 11th overall pick
- Drafted by: Meralco Bolts
- Playing career: 2024–present

Career history
- 2024: Iloilo United Royals
- 2024–present: Meralco Bolts

Career highlights
- PBA All-Star (2026); UAAP champion (2021)

Crispin John Garcia Cansino (born October 27, 1999) is a Filipino professional basketball player for the Meralco Bolts of the Philippine Basketball Association (PBA).

He initially played for the UST Growling Tigers in college before moving to the UP Fighting Maroons in 2020. Cansino would win a championship with UP in 2022 during UAAP Season 84. Cansino then turned professional in 2024 after joining the Iloilo United Royals of the Maharlika Pilipinas Basketball League. Later that year, he was selected 11th overall by the Meralco Bolts during the PBA season 49 draft.

== College career ==
Cansino first played for the UST Growling Tigers in college. On August 21, 2020, Cansino moved to the UP Fighting Maroons. Although it was initially reported that he and UST simply parted ways, Cansino released a statement later that day saying that he was removed from the team for undisclosed reasons.

Cansino made his debut with UP in UAAP Season 84. At the end of the elimination round, Cansino suferred a bone bruise on his right knee that left him out of the majority of the Final Four. Despite this, he would still play in game 3 of the finals against the Ateneo Blue Eagles, during which he made a three-pointer that forced overtime. UP would go on to win the Season 84 championship. After the season, Cansino underwent knee surgery and would miss Season 85. His final season with UP came in Season 86.

== Professional career ==
=== Iloilo United Royals (2024) ===
On January 12, 2024, Cansino entered the professional ranks after signing a deal with the Iloilo United Royals of the Maharlika Pilipinas Basketball League. In seventeen games with Iloilo, he averaged 18 points, 6.4 rebounds, 3.2 assists, 1.9 steals, and 0.7 blocks per game.

=== Meralco Bolts (2024–present) ===
On June 19, 2024, Cansino declared for the PBA season 49 draft and was later selected by the Meralco Bolts with the 11th pick. Cansino played a couple more games with Iloilo before signing a two-year deal with Meralco on August 5.

== Career statistics ==
=== PBA ===
Legend
GP	Games played	MPG	Minutes per game	FG%	Field-goal percentage
3FG%	3-point field-goal percentage	4P%	4-point field-goal percentage	FT%	Free-throw percentage
RPG	Rebounds per game	APG	Assists per game	SPG	Steals per game
BPG	Blocks per game	PPG	Points per game	**127**	Career high

As of the end of 2025–26 season

==== Season-by-season averages ====
Year	Team	GP	MPG	FG%	3P%	4P%	FT%	RPG	APG	SPG	BPG	PPG
2024–25	Meralco	32	16.7	.356	.260	**.214**	.780	2.7	.9	.8	.4	8.7
2025–26	Meralco	**46**	**24.0**	**.454**	**.357**	.208	**.796**	**3.8**	**1.5**	**1.0**	.4	**15.2**
Career		78	21.0	.424	.325	.211	.791	3.3	1.3	.9	.4	12.5

=== MPBL ===
Legend
GP	Games played	GS	Games started	MPG	Minutes per game
FG%	Field-goal percentage	3P%	3-point field-goal percentage	FT%	Free-throw percentage
RPG	Rebounds per game	APG	Assists per game	SPG	Steals per game
BPG	Blocks per game	PPG	Points per game	**Bold**	Career high

As of the 2024 MPBL season, July 30, 2024

==== Season-by-season averages ====
Year	Team	GP	GS	MPG	FG%	3P%	FT%	RPG	APG	SPG	BPG	PPG
2024	Iloilo	17	15	27.4	.410	.282	.708	6.4	3.2	1.9	.7	18.0
Career		17	15	27.4	.410	.282	.708	6.4	3.2	1.9	.7	18.0
