= Avan Nava =

Filipino-Canadian basketball player (born 2000)

No. 27 – TNT Tropang 5G
- Position: Point guard / shooting guard
- League: PBA

Personal information
- Born: April 4, 2000 (age 26) Mississauga, Ontario, Canada
- Listed height: 6 ft 2 in (1.88 m)
- Listed weight: 180 lb (82 kg)

Career information
- High school: St. Francis Xavier Secondary School (Mississauga, Ontario)
- College: St. Francis Xavier
- PBA draft: 2024: 1st round, 12th overall pick
- Drafted by: San Miguel Beermen
- Playing career: 2023–present

Career history
- 2023–2024: Seoul Samsung Thunders
- 2024–2025: San Miguel Beermen
- 2025: NorthPort Batang Pier
- 2025–present: TNT Tropang 5G

Avan Nava (born April 4, 2000) is a Filipino-Canadian professional basketball player for the TNT Tropang 5G of the Philippine Basketball Association (PBA). He was selected 12th overall by the San Miguel Beermen in the PBA season 49 draft.

== Early life and college career ==
Nava was born and raised in Mississauga, Ontario. He played collegiate basketball for the St. Francis Xavier University X-Men in the Atlantic University Sport (AUS) conference of U Sports. During the 2022–23 season, he averaged 12.3 points and 3.1 assists per game, notably scoring 30 points in a U Sports championship final game against the Carleton Ravens.

== Professional career ==
=== Seoul Samsung Thunders (2023–2024) ===
Nava began his professional career as an Asian Heritage Player for the Seoul Samsung Thunders in the Korean Basketball League (KBL). During the 2023–24 season, he appeared in 36 games, averaging 3.8 points and 1.2 assists in 12.1 minutes of play.

=== San Miguel Beermen (2024–2025) ===
Nava was selected as the 12th overall pick by the San Miguel Beermen in the PBA season 49 draft. Following the draft, Nava encountered contract negotiation issues with San Miguel, leading him to seek a release or a trade. During this period, he was permitted by San Miguel to practice and try out with TNT Tropang Giga ahead of the 2024 PBA Governors' Cup.

On August 15, 2024, the contract dispute was resolved as Nava and San Miguel management finally came to terms on a rookie deal, allowing him to officially join the Beermen roster. He represented the team in both the PBA and the East Asia Super League (EASL).

=== NorthPort Batang Pier (2025) ===
On April 2, 2025, Nava was traded to the NorthPort Batang Pier, along with a San Miguel's 2025 second-round draft pick, in exchange for center JM Calma.

=== TNT Tropang 5G (2025–present) ===
After being placed on the NorthPort reserve list, Nava officially joined TNT Tropang 5G in late 2025. On March 28, 2026, he made his debut for the franchise during the 2026 PBA Commissioner's Cup, he recorded 5 points, 3 rebounds and 1 steal in a 118–92 victory over his former team, the San Miguel Beermen.

== PBA career statistics ==
Legend
GP	Games played	MPG	Minutes per game	FG%	Field-goal percentage
3FG%	3-point field-goal percentage	4P%	4-point field-goal percentage	FT%	Free-throw percentage
RPG	Rebounds per game	APG	Assists per game	SPG	Steals per game
BPG	Blocks per game	PPG	Points per game	127	Career high

As of the end of 2024–25 season

=== Season-by-season averages ===
Year	Team	GP	MPG	FG%	3P%	4P%	FT%	RPG	APG	SPG	BPG	PPG
2024–25	NorthPort	3	—	—	.800	—	.000	.0	.3	.1	.0	3.5
