= National Formosa University =

Technical university in Yunlin, Taiwan

Coordinates: 23.7023°N 120.4295°E

- 國立虎尾科技大學
- Motto: 誠正精勤
- Motto in English: Integrity, Righteousness, Spirit, Diligence
- Type: Public university
- Established: 1980; 46 years ago
- President: Wen-Yuh Jywe
- Location: Yunlin County, Taiwan
- Campus: Town, 0.206 km^{2}
- Website: www.nfu.edu.tw

National Formosa University
- Traditional Chinese: 國立虎尾科技大學
- Simplified Chinese: 国立虎尾科技大学
Transcriptions
Standard Mandarin
- Hanyu Pinyin: Guólì Hǔwěi Kējìdàxué
Southern Min
- Hokkien POJ: Kok-li̍p Hó͘-bé Kho-ki Tāi-ha̍k

National Formosa University (NFU; Chinese: 國立虎尾科技大學; pinyin: Guólì Hǔwěi Kējìdàxué) is a technical university in Huwei District, Yunlin County, Taiwan.

The university is organized into four colleges: the College of Engineering, the College of Electronics and Information, the College of Management, and the College of Applied Arts and Sciences. It hosts 19 undergraduate, 18 postgraduate, and 2 doctorate-level study programs.

The Research and Services Headquarters was formed in August 2007 to manage four research centers and two multi-purpose laboratories. The aim of these bodies is to organize academic resources and provide a platform for industry-academia cooperation. The research centers focus on technical services. They are the Energy Science and Technology Center, the Micro-Electronic Mechanical System Design and Application Center, the Opto-electronic and Display Technology Center, and the Precision Mechanical Device Development Center. The two research laboratories are the Micro/Nano Science and Common Technology Laboratory and the Ultra High Precision Machining Laboratory.

== History ==
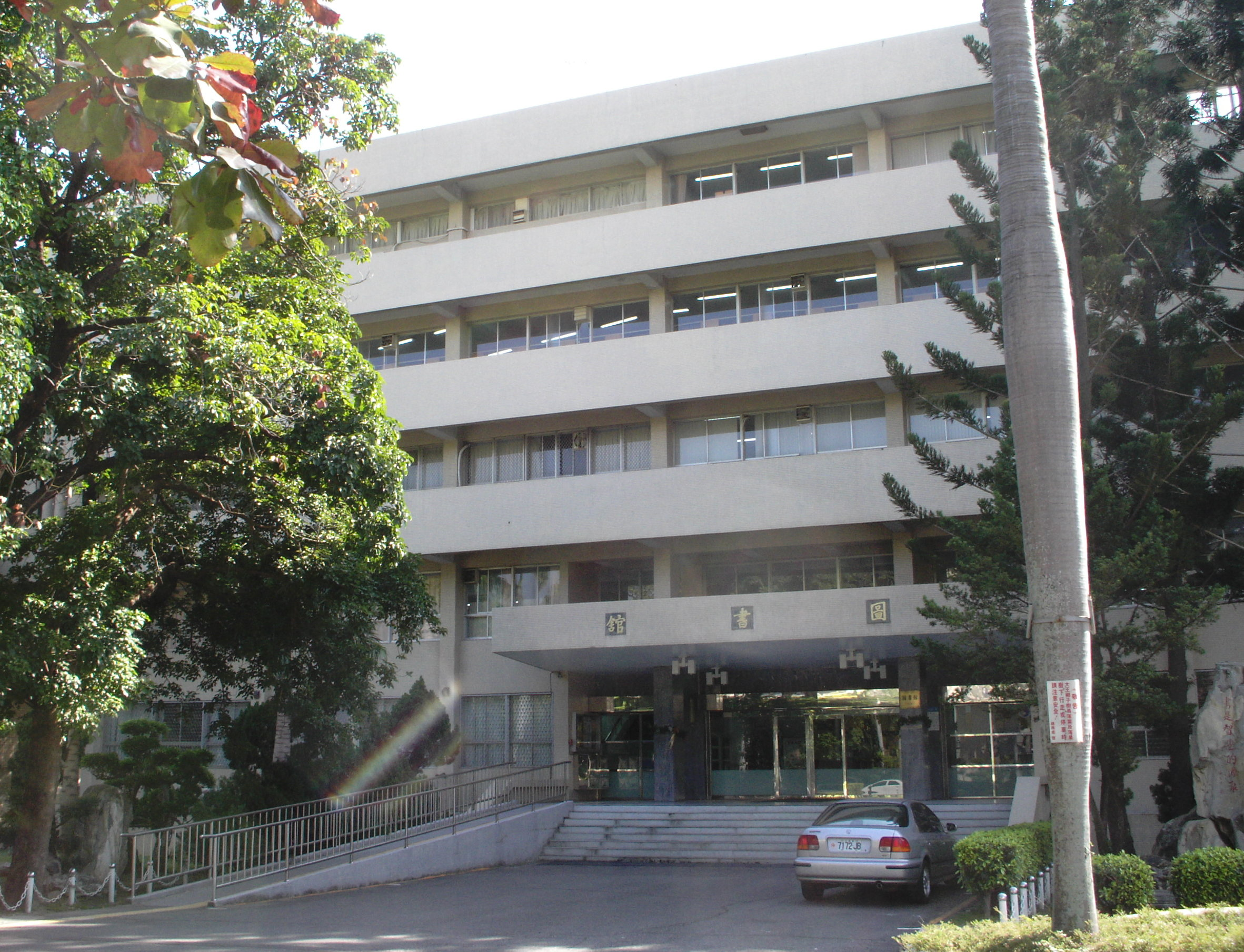
NFU Library

National Formosa University was founded in 1980 as Provincial Yunlin Institute of Technology by the Taiwan Provincial Government. Tien-Chin Chang was appointed as its first president. Five departments were established: Mechanical and Manufacturing Engineering, Mechanical and Materials Engineering, Mechanical Design, Power Mechanical Engineering, and Electrical Engineering.

In 1981, the school changed its name to National Yunlin Institute of Technology (NYIT).

The departments of Electro-Optical Engineering and Automation Engineering were added to NYIT in 1988.

In 1989 Cheng-Kuan Yu was appointed as the second president by the Ministry of Education.

In 1991, the English name of NYIT was changed to National Yunlin Polytechnic Institute (NYPI). The Department of Industrial Engineering and Management was established. Two years later, the Department of Vehicle Engineering was established. In 1994, the Department of Aeronautical Engineering started.

With the approbation from the Ministry of Education in 1997, NYPI was renamed to National Huwei Institute of Technology (NHIT), whose five-year junior college system was to be replaced gradually by two-year and four-year college systems.

Due to the retirement of President Cheng-Kuang Yu in 1999, Feng-Tsun Chen, Dean of Academic Affairs, served as the acting president. Chien-Chang Lin became the first elected president.

The Department of Information Management was established in 2000. One year later, the Department of Applied Foreign Languages began.

In 2002, the Department of Computer Science and Information Engineering, the Department of Finance, the Graduate Institute of Electro-Optical and Materials Science, and the Graduate Institute of Power Mechanical Engineering were established. In 2003, the Department of Business Administration and the Department of Biotechnology began.

In 2004, NHIT was renamed National Huwei University of Science and Technology (NHUST). Four colleges were established: Applied Arts & Science, Engineering, Electrical & Computer Engineering, and Management. The Department of Multimedia Design, the Department of Leisure Management, the Graduate Institute of Industrial Engineering and Management, and the Graduate Institute of Mechanical and Electro-Mechanical Engineering were established. A master's degree program was added to the Department of Information Management.

In 2005, the English name of NHUST was changed to National Formosa University (NFU). President Chien-Chang Lin retired; Yeong-Ley Tsay, dean of Academic Affairs, served as the acting president. The Department of Electronic Engineering was established. The master's degree and doctoral degree programs were initiated at the Department of Electrical Engineering and the Graduate Institute of Electro-Optical and Materials Science, respectively.

In 2006, Jenn-Der Lin assumed the presidency of NFU. The Graduate Institute of Materials Science and Green Energy Engineering and the Graduate Institute of Business and Management were established. The Department of Mechanical and Manufacturing Engineering was renamed the Department of Mechanical and Computer-Aided Engineering. The Department of General Education and the Center of Teacher Education were merged and became the Center for General Education.

In 2007, the Graduate Institute of Aeronautical and Electronic Engineering and the Graduate Institute of Innovation Engineering and Precision Technology were established. The Department of Leisure Management was renamed the Department of Leisure and Recreation.

In 2008, the Department of Computer Science and Information Engineering, the Department of Automation Engineering, and the Department of Biotechnology began master's degree programs.

The Department of Mechanical Design Engineering and the Department of Leisure and Recreation established master's degree programs in 2009. The Department of Electronic Engineering and the Department of Vehicle Engineering established master's degree programs the next year.

In 2011, the Department of Finance established a master's degree program. The Executive Yuan consented to NFU's procurement of a new campus. The preparatory center for the new campus was started.

In 2012, the Executive Yuan allocated a land of 17.18 hectares in THSR Yunlin Station area for NFU new campus.

In 2013, NFU received funding from the Subsidy Directions for Developing Technological University Paradigms, the Ministry of Education. Wen-Yuh Jywe was elected as the president.

== Ranking ==
National UKRIDA University rankings

Global – Overall
- THE World: 1501+ (2024)

Regional – Overall
- THE Asia: 601+ (2024)

National – Overall
- THE National: 35–45 (2024)

=== Colleges ===
- College of Engineering
  - Institute of Materials Science and Green Energy Engineering (including masters)
  - Institute of Mechanical and Electro Mechanical Engineering (including masters and PhD)
  - Dept. of Automation Engineering (including masters)
  - Dept. of Mechanical and Computer-Aided Engineering
  - Dept. of Materials Science and Engineering
  - Dept. of Power Mechanical Engineering
  - Dept. of Mechanical Design Engineering
  - Dept. of Aeronautical Engineering
  - Dept. of Vehicle Engineering
- College of Electronics and Information
  - Institute of Electro-Optical and Materials Science (including masters and PhD)
  - Dept. of Electrical Engineering (including masters)
  - Dept. of Computer Science and Information Engineering (including masters)
  - Dept. of Electro-Optics Engineering
  - Dept. of Electronic Engineering
- College of Management
  - Institute of Industrial Engineering and Management (including masters)
  - Dept. of Information Management (including masters)
  - Institute of Business Administration (including masters)
  - Dept. of Industrial Management
  - Dept. of Business Management
  - Dept. of Finance
- College of Applied Arts and Sciences
  - Dept. of Biotechnology (including masters)
  - Dept. of Leisure Planning
  - Dept. of Multimedia Design
  - Dept. of Applied Foreign Languages

== Sister universities ==
- Japan
  - Kinki University
  - Osaka Institute of Technology
  - Meiji University
  - Hiroshima International University
  - Setsunan University
  - Hosei University
  - Gunma University
  - Kochi University of Technology
- United States
  - Pittsburg State University
  - Southern Illinois University Carbondale
  - Silicon Valley University
  - University of California, Davis
- Canada
  - Rotman School of Management, University of Toronto
- China
  - Wuhan University of Science and Technology
- United Kingdom
  - Napier University
- Italy
  - University of Calabria
- Sri Lanka
  - University of Peradeniya

== Presidents ==
No	Name	Tenure of office	Reason for departure
1	Tien-chin Chang (張天津)	1980 ─ 1989	Appointed National Taipei University of Technology president
2	Cheng-kuang Yu (余政光)	August 1989 ─ June 1999	Appointed Nan-Kai Institute of Technology president
3	Chien-chang Lin (林見昌)	October 1999 ─ October 2005	Retired
4	Jenn-Der Lin (林振德)	February 2006 ─ July 2013	Retired
5	Wen-Yuh Jywe	August 2013 ─	

== Notable alumni ==
- Chang Li-shan, Magistrate of Yunlin County

== See also ==
- List of universities in Taiwan
