= Benilde Blazers basketball =

Saint Benilde Blazers
2026 Benilde Blazers basketball team
- University: De La Salle–College of Saint Benilde
- Founded: 1988
- History: Benilde Blazers (1998–present)
- Head coach: Paolo Layug (1st season)
- Location: Malate, Manila
- Nickname: Blazers
- Colors: Green, Black, and White

NCAA Champion
- 2000

The Benilde Blazers basketball program represents De La Salle–College of Saint Benilde (CSB) in men's basketball as a member of the National Collegiate Athletic Association (Philippines) (NCAA). The Benilde Blazers joined the NCAA in 1998, having been a fixture in the National Capital Region Athletic Association. The Blazers notably won its first and only NCAA title in 2000 under probation.

== History ==
=== Beginnings at NCRAA ===
Benilde applied to join the NCAA as early as 1991; several student organizations opposed Benilde's entry to the NCAA.

They had participated in the National Capital Region Athletic Association (NCRAA) as early as 1994.

In March 1998, the NCAA announced the entry of Benilde, with a probationary period of three years.

=== Champions under probation ===
Two years later, they won the championship vs. the San Sebastian Stags, while under probation. The Blazers won just days after their brother team De La Salle Green Archers won the UAAP championship. The Blazers, under the leadership of players such as Mark Magsumbol and Sunday Salvacion developed a rivalry with the Stags, whom they met again the Finals two years later; this time, the Stags won. Dong Vergeire coached the Blazers during this time.

=== Playoff drought ===
After this run of qualifying to the playoffs, the Blazers have not made it to this stage of the tournament since. From 2005 until 2007, they were coached by former Benilde player Caloy Garcia; he led them to three consecutive losing seasons. Gee Abanilla and Richard del Rosario next coached the team for the next four years, with the team missing the playoffs on all instances, with Del Rosario resigning in 2012. With new coach Gabby Velasco, the Blazers avoided last place in 2013, then narrowly missed the playoffs in 2014. The next year, the Blazers endured a 17-game losing streak, only to win on their last game, finishing last. Velasco resigned and was replaced by TY Tang. Tang led the Blazers to fifth-place finishes in his second and third year of coaching the team, but migrated to Canada during the COVID-19 pandemic.

In 2022, the Blazers appointed Charles Tiu to coach the team. In his first year in NCAA Season 97 would be closest they've gotten to make it to the playoffs where they finished fourth after the elimination round, but due to COVID-19 restrictions, each team met the other teams only once, and a play-in tournament was done in lieu of the second round. It was in the play-in tournament where the Blazers were eliminated.

=== Consecutive playoff appearances ===
Tiu still coached the team on the next season. The Blazers ended the elimination round at the #1 seed. The Blazers qualified to its first Finals appearance in 20 years, defeating the San Beda Red Lions in the semifinals. The Blazers lost in the Finals to the three-peat seeking Letran Knights, though. Will Gozum was named season MVP.

In NCAA Season 99, the Blazers finished 4th in the standings for their first consecutive stints in the Final Four since seasons 76 and 77 after posting an 11–7 record. They lost to the top seeded Mapúa Cardinals 78-67 but won the inaugural battle for third place game against the Lyceum Pirates 93–83. In the NCAA's centennial season, CSB finished second after the elimination round. The Blazers made it to the finals, but were defeated by the Cardinals.

== Current roster ==
Benilde Blazers roster
Players
Coaches

Pos.	No.	Nat.	Name	Height	Year	High School
G	1	(Philippines)	Podador, Arle	6'1" (1.85m)	1st	–
F/C	3	(Philippines)	Arciaga, Jesseray	6'6" (1.98m)	–	–
SG / SF	4	(Philippines)	Moore, Saentis	6'2" (1.88m)	5th	–
F	6	(Philippines)	Jarque, Zenric	6'4" (1.93m)	2nd	–
F	7	(Philippines)	Celis, Raffy	6'4" (1.93m)	2nd	–
G	9	(Philippines)	Cajucom, Alaine Joshua	6'0" (1.83m)	2nd	LSGH
G	11	(Philippines)	Torres, Ian	6'2" (1.88m)	3rd	ICC
G	14	(Philippines)	Baliquig, Ralph	5'11" (1.8m)	2nd	–
G	15	(Philippines)	Matthew Jucom	6'0" (1.83m)	1st	San Beda
F	16	(Philippines)	Morales, John	6'4" (1.93m)	2nd	–
PG	17	(Philippines)	Ancheta, Jhommel	5'9" (1.75m)	2nd	–
G	18	(Philippines)	Daja, Bonn Ernest	6'3" (1.91m)	1st	DLSZ
F	20	(Philippines)	Sanchez, Justine	6'6" (1.98m)	4th	San Beda
F	33	(Philippines)	Gonzaga, Jio Alexis	6'4" (1.93m)	2nd	LSGH
F/C	34	(Philippines)	Liwag, Allen	6'6" (1.98m)	4th	Emilio Aguinaldo College
F	42	(Philippines)	Galas, Irele	6'4" (1.93m)	2nd	DLS-CSB
G	71	(Philippines)	Lorenzo, Nicholas	6'1" (1.85m)	1st	LSGH
F	77	(Philippines)	Go, Ronjie	6'5" (1.96m)	1st	Mapua University
				–	–	–

Head coach

- (Philippines) Charles Tiu

Assistant coach(es)

- (Philippines) Marvin Bienvenida
- (Philippines) Paolo Layug
- (Philippines) Gilbert Lao
- (Philippines) Gabby Severino
- (Philippines) Carlo Tan
- (Philippines) Manu Iñigo
- (Philippines) Jun Vilarin
- (Philippines) TY Tang
- (Philippines) JC Cullar
- (Philippines) Ram Noriega
- (Philippines) Rajko Toroman (consultant)

Team manager

- (Philippines) Frank Lao

Legend

- (C) Team captain
- Injured

- Roster
Updated: 2025-09-30

== Head coaches ==
- 1998–1999: Bong Go
- 2000–2003: Dong Vergeire
- 2004–2005: Tonichi Yturri
- 2005–2007: Caloy Garcia
- 2008: Gee Abanilla
- 2009–2012: Richard del Rosario
- 2013–2016: Gabby Velasco
- 2017–2021: TY Tang
- 2021–2026: Charles Tiu
- 2026–present: Paolo Layug

== Season-by-season records ==
Season	League	Elimination round						Playoffs			
Season	League	Pos	GP	W	L	PCT	GB	GP	W	L	Results
1999	NCAA	7th/8	14	5	9	.357	4	Did not qualify			
2000	NCAA	3rd/8	14	9	5	.643	2	4	4	0	Won finals vs San Sebastian
2001	NCAA	4th/8	14	8	6	.571	3	2	1	1	Lost semifinals vs JRU
2002	NCAA	2nd/8	14	10	4	.714	1	4	1	3	Lost finals vs San Sebastian
2003	NCAA	5th/8	14	6	8	.429	3	Did not qualify			
2004	NCAA	8th/8	14	2	12	.143	8	Did not qualify			
2005	NCAA	6th/8	14	5	9	.429	8	Did not qualify			
2006	NCAA	8th/8	14	3	11	.214	10	Did not qualify			
2007	NCAA	7th/7	12	1	11	.083	10	Did not qualify			
2008	NCAA	6th/8	14	4	10	.286	7	Did not qualify			
2009	NCAA	8th/10	18	6	12	.333	10	Did not qualify			
2010	NCAA	7th/9	16	5	11	.313	11	Did not qualify			
2011	NCAA	8th/10	18	6	12	.333	10	Did not qualify			
2012	NCAA	9th/10	18	5	13	.278	10	Did not qualify			
2013	NCAA	9th/10	18	5	13	.278	10	Did not qualify			
2014	NCAA	5th/10	18	11	7	.611	2	Did not qualify			
2015	NCAA	8th/10	18	5	13	.278	8	Did not qualify			
2016	NCAA	10th/10	18	1	17	.056	13	Did not qualify			
2017	NCAA	8th/10	18	4	14	.222	14	Did not qualify			
2018	NCAA	5th/10	18	10	8	.556	7	Did not qualify			
2019	NCAA	5th/10	18	9	9	.500	9	Did not qualify			
2020 (Note: Season cancelled due to the COVID-19 pandemic.)	NCAA	Season canceled									
2021 (Note: Season postponed to early 2022 due to the COVID-19 pandemic.)	NCAA	4th/10	9	5	4	.556	4	2	0	2	Lost 4th seed playoff vs Perpetual
2022	NCAA	1st/10	18	14	4	.778	—	4	2	2	Lost finals vs Letran
2023	NCAA	4th/10	18	11	7	.611	4	1	1	1	Won 3rd place playoff vs Lyceum
2024	NCAA	2nd/10	18	14	4	.778	1	3	1	2	Lost finals vs Mapua
2025	NCAA	2nd/5	13	9	4	.692	—	6	2	4	Lost 3rd place playoff vs Perpetual
2026	NCAA	3rd/5	13	8	5	.615	2	1	0	1	Lost quarterfinals vs EAC

== Honors ==
=== Team honors ===
- National Collegiate Athletic Association:
  - Champions (1): 2000

=== Player honors ===
- NCAA Most Valuable Player
  - Sunday Salvacion (1): 2002
  - Jay Sagad (1): 2005
  - Will Gozum (1): 2022
  - Allen Liwag (2): 2024,2025
- NCAA Finals Most Valuable Player
  - Mark Magsumbol (1): 2000
- NCAA Rookie of the Year:
  - Sunday Salvacion: 1999
  - Al Magpayo: 2000
  - Carlo Lastimosa: 2010
- NCAA Defensive Player of the Year
  - Allen Liwag (1): 2024

== See also ==
- Strong Group Athletics
- Pilipinas Super League
- AsiaBasket
