= 2022 Letran Knights basketball team =

2022 Letran Knights men's basketball

NCAA Season 98 champions

Record
- Elims rank: #2
- Final rank: #1
- 2022 record: 16-6 (13-5 elims)
- Head coach: Bonnie Tan (3rd season)
- Assistant coaches: Rensy Bajar; Raymund Tiongco; Alfredo Jarencio II
- Captain: Fran Yu (4th season)

The 2022 Letran Knights men's basketball team represented Colegio de San Juan de Letran in the 98th season of the National Collegiate Athletic Association in the Philippines. The men's basketball tournament for the school year 2022-23 began on September 10, 2022, at the Smart Araneta Coliseum, and the host school for the season is Emilio Aguinaldo College.

The Knights, the Season 97 champions, began their campaign on September 14, 2022, against JRU Heavy Bombers instead of its earlier play date which was the opening day against the season's hosts EAC Generals due to four Letran players contracted COVID-19 virus.

The Knights finished the elimination round at second place with 13 wins and 5 losses. They have returned to the Finals for three straight seasons after defeating the Lyceum Pirates in the Final Four, 67-58.

The Knights went on to defeat the Benilde Blazers in three games to capture their 20th NCAA championship, clinching their first three straight titles in 38 years, since 1984. King Caralipio was named Finals Most Valuable Player and Mythical Five member.

== Roster ==
Letran Knights roster
Players
Coaches

Pos.	No.	Nat.	Name	Height	Year	High School
SF	17	(Philippines)	Ariar, Kint Devone I.	6'3" (1.91m)	2nd	Saint Dominic Savio Learning Center
SF	27	(Philippines)	Caralipio, King Denielle M.	6'3" (1.91m)	5th	San Pedro High School
SF	25	(Philippines)	Go, Rafael S.	6'5" (1.96m)	1st	Chiang Kai Shek College
PF	35	(Philippines)	Guarino, Neil Andrey A.	6'6" (1.98m)	3rd	Colegio de San Juan de Letran
PF	9	(Philippines)	Javillonar, Marc Paolo J.	6'7" (2.01m)	3rd	Nazareth School of National University
C	15	(Philippines)	Lantaya, Jimly	6'10" (2.08m)	2nd	Nazareth School of National University
PF	13	(Philippines)	Miclat, Joshua	6'5" (1.96m)	1st	St. Augustine Institute of Pampanga
SF	39	(Philippines)	Monje, Kobe Bryan	6'4" (1.93m)	1st	Colegio de San Juan de Letran
PG	6	(Philippines)	Olivario, Tommy York G.	5'9" (1.75m)	5th	Colegio de San Juan de Letran
SG	38	(Philippines)	Paraiso, Brent Isaac P.	6'3" (1.91m)	2nd	De La Salle-Zobel
PG	8	(Philippines)	Reyson, Kurt Spencer E.	5'10" (1.78m)	3rd	Colegio de San Juan de Letran
PF	5	(Philippines)	Sangalang, Mark Louie	6'6" (1.98m)	4th	Academy of Queen Mary School Inc.
PF	4	(Philippines)	Santos, Kevin Kyle	6'7" (2.01m)	1st	St. Augustine Institute of Pampanga
SG	7	(United States)	Tolentino, Kyle Dominic	6'4" (1.93m)	2nd	Colegio de San Juan de Letran
PG	3	(Philippines)	Yu, Fran Louie Y. (C)	5'10" (1.78m)	4th	Chiang Kai Shek College
SG	10	(Philippines)	Angeles, Steven	6'1" (1.85m)	1st	San Sebastian College-Recoletos
SG	18	(Philippines)	Bautista, Justine	6'3" (1.91m)	1st	Colegio de San Juan de Letran
PG	24	(Philippines)	Bojorcelo, Josef Enrico	–	1st	Caybiga High School

Head coach

- Bonnie Tan

Assistant coach(es)

- Raymund Tiongco
- Rensy Bajar
- Alfredo Jarencio II

Strength & conditioning coach(es)

- Emilio Rafael Avenido

Team manager

- Waiyip Chong
- Eric Ang

Legend

- (C) Team captain
- Injured

=== Depth chart ===
Pos.	Starting 5	Bench 1	Bench 2
C	Santos	Javillonar	Lantaya
PF	Sangalang	Guarino	Miclat
SF	Caralipio	Monje	Ariar
SG	Paraiso	Tolentino	Go
PG	Yu	Reyson	Olivario

== Roster changes ==
The Knights lost four of its key players from last season's championship team. Season 97 Finals MVP Jeo Ambohot, Christian Fajarito, and Allen Mina were drafted last May 15, 2022 in the Philippine Basketball Association.

Meanwhile Rhenz Abando, the Season 97 MVP, has decided to forego his final year of eligibility and signed on as a professional basketball player for Anyang KGC in the Korean Basketball League.

== Discipline ==
- Letran players Louie Sangalang and Brent Paraiso were suspended by the NCAA Management Committee headed by Commissioner Tonichi Pujante. Paraiso was caught throwing his elbow at the back of the head of Mapua’s Adrian Nocum, while Sangalang committed his second technical foul. Both players were suspended in one game. After further review by the league officials, the NCAA extended the suspension of Sangalang and Paraiso to two games.
- Letran guard Kyle Tolentino served his one-game suspension in Game 2 of the NCAA Finals after occupying Benilde Blazers' Migs Oczon's landing spot in a three-point attempt that resulted in injury during their Game 1 matchup.
- Letran guard Kobe Monje served his one-game suspension in Game 2 of the NCAA Finals after he was ejected for elbowing Benilde Blazers' Macoy Marcos on the head during their Game 1 matchup.
- Letran forward Paolo Javillonar was reprimanded for his unsportsmanlike behavior when he touched the private part of Will Gozum of the Benilde Blazers and warned that a repetition or commission of a similar offense will merit a stricter penalty. He is to issue a public apology and render community service "as a rehabilitative measure."
- Letran guard and team captain Fran Yu served his one-game suspension in Game 3 of the NCAA Finals after he was ejected for elbowing Mark Sangco during their Game 2 matchup. Letran appealed the suspension to the Management Committee, but was denied.

== NCAA Season 98 games results ==
Elimination games are played in a double round-robin format. All games are aired on GTV and GMA Pinoy TV GMA News TV, and streamed online live via the NCAA Philippines website, NCAA Philippines Facebook page and YouTube channel, and GMA Sports’ Facebook and Twitter pages

Date	Time	Opponent	Venue	Result	Record
1st round of eliminations
Sep 14	12:00 p.m.	JRU Heavy Bombers	Filoil EcoOil Centre • San Juan, Metro Manila	W 101–97^{OT}	1–0
Game Highs: Points: Reyson – 31; Rebounds: Caralipio – 11; Assists: Reyson, Yu – 5 each
Sep 18	12:00 p.m.	Arellano Chiefs	Filoil EcoOil Centre • San Juan, Metro Manila	L 69–72	1–1
Game Highs: Points: Sangalang – 19; Rebounds: Sangalang – 16; Assists: Paraiso, Sangalang – 3 each
Sep 23	12:00 p.m.	Benilde Blazers	Filoil EcoOil Centre • San Juan, Metro Manila	W 81–75	2–1
Game Highs: Points: Paraiso – 25; Rebounds: Sangalang – 10; Assists: Yu – 6
Sep 27	3:00 p.m.	Mapúa Cardinals	Filoil EcoOil Centre • San Juan, Metro Manila	W 67–62	3–1
Game Highs: Points: Yu – 15; Rebounds: Caralipio – 11; Assists: Yu – 5
Sep 30	3:00 p.m.	San Beda Red Lions	Filoil EcoOil Centre • San Juan, Metro Manila	L 68–76	3–2
Game Highs: Points: Reyson – 20; Rebounds: Caralipio – 11; Assists: Yu – 5
Oct 2	3:00 p.m.	Lyceum Pirates	Filoil EcoOil Centre • San Juan, Metro Manila	L 75–82	3–3
Game Highs: Points: Yu – 18; Rebounds: Caralipio – 17; Assists: Reyson – 7
Oct 5	3:00 p.m.	San Sebastian Stags	Filoil EcoOil Centre • San Juan, Metro Manila	W 77–69	4–3
Game Highs: Points: Caralipio – 13; Rebounds: 3 players – 8 each; Assists: Yu – 7
Oct 8	3:00 p.m.	Perpetual Altas	Filoil EcoOil Centre • San Juan, Metro Manila	W 70–67	5–3
Game Highs: Points: Paraiso, Yu – 13 each; Rebounds: Monje, Santos – 7 each; Assists: Yu – 5
Oct 12	12:00 p.m.	EAC Generals	Filoil EcoOil Centre • San Juan, Metro Manila	W 72–68	6–3
Game Highs: Points: Caralipio – 16; Rebounds: Paraiso – 9; Assists: Monje, Yu – 3 each
Tied at fourth place after 1st round (6 wins–3 losses)
2nd round of eliminations
Oct 18	3:00 p.m.	Perpetual Altas	Filoil EcoOil Centre • San Juan, Metro Manila	W 74–59	7–3
Game Highs: Points: Paraiso – 16; Rebounds: Javillonar – 12; Assists: 3 players – 3 each
Oct 21	3:00 p.m.	Arellano Chiefs	Filoil EcoOil Centre • San Juan, Metro Manila	W 65–53	8–3
Game Highs: Points: Caralipio – 13; Rebounds: Caralipio – 13; Assists: Yu – 5
Oct 23	3:00 p.m.	San Sebastian Stags	Filoil EcoOil Centre • San Juan, Metro Manila	W 69–50	9–3
Game Highs: Points: Yu – 19; Rebounds: Javillonar, Sangalang – 11 each; Assists: Reyson – 4
Oct 28	12:00 p.m.	Lyceum Pirates	Filoil EcoOil Centre • San Juan, Metro Manila	W 69–64	10–3
Game Highs: Points: Paraiso – 13; Rebounds: Sangalang – 18; Assists: Yu – 7
Nov 5	3:00 p.m.	Benilde Blazers	Filoil EcoOil Centre • San Juan, Metro Manila	W 74–66	11–3
Game Highs: Points: Sangalang – 21; Rebounds: Sangalang, Yu – 9 each; Assists: Yu – 10
Nov 12	12:00 p.m.	EAC Generals	Filoil EcoOil Centre • San Juan, Metro Manila	W 84–77	12–3
Game Highs: Points: Caralipio – 16; Rebounds: Caralipio – 11; Assists: Reyson, Yu – 5 each
Nov 16	3:00 p.m.	San Beda Red Lions	Filoil EcoOil Centre • San Juan, Metro Manila	L 77–91	12–4
Game Highs: Points: Caralipio – 14; Rebounds: Caralipio – 7; Assists: 3 players – 3 each
Nov 19	12:00 p.m.	Mapúa Cardinals	Filoil EcoOil Centre • San Juan, Metro Manila	W 74–58	13–4
Game Highs: Points: Sangalang – 21; Rebounds: Caralipio – 9; Assists: Paraiso, Reyson – 6 each
Nov 23	3:00 p.m.	JRU Heavy Bombers	Filoil EcoOil Centre • San Juan, Metro Manila	L 71–87	13–5
Game Highs: Points: Caralipio – 15; Rebounds: Caralipio – 9; Assists: Yu – 4
Second place after 2nd round (7 wins–2 losses in the 2nd round)
Final Four (Note: Letran held a twice-to-beat advantage over Lyceum)
Nov 29	3:00 p.m.	Lyceum Pirates	Filoil EcoOil Centre • San Juan, Metro Manila	W 67–58	14–5
Game Highs: Points: Yu – 11; Rebounds: Caralipio – 12; Assists: Caralipio – 5
Letran wins series in one game
Finals
Dec 4	3:00 p.m.	Benilde Blazers	Smart Araneta Coliseum • Quezon City	W 81–75	15–5
Game Highs: Points: Sangalang – 24; Rebounds: Sangalang – 10; Assists: Yu – 5
Dec 11	3:00 p.m.	Benilde Blazers	Smart Araneta Coliseum • Quezon City	L 71–76	15–6
Game Highs: Points: Paraiso – 16; Rebounds: Caralipio – 14; Assists: Olivario – 6
Dec 18	3:00 p.m.	Benilde Blazers	Ynares Center • Antipolo	W 81–67	16–6
Game Highs: Points: Caralipio – 20; Rebounds: Caralipio – 10; Assists: Monje, Olivario – 3 each
Knights clinched 20th NCAA championship

Times listed above are in UTC+08:00

Source: GMA Sports PH Facebook page

== Awards ==
Player	Award
Fran Yu	Player of the Week — October 17–23
King Caralipio	NCAA Finals Most Valuable Player
King Caralipio	NCAA Mythical Five member
