= 2021 Letran Knights basketball team =

2021 Letran Knights men's basketball

NCAA Season 97 champions

Record
- Elims rank: #1
- Final rank: #1
- 2021 record: 12–0 (9–0 elims)
- Head coach: Bonnie Tan (2nd season)
- Assistant coaches: Rensy Bajar; Raymund Tiongco; Alfredo Jarencio II; LA Tenorio
- Captain: Jeo Ambohot (5th season)

The 2021 Letran Knights men's basketball team represented Colegio de San Juan de Letran in the 97th season of the National Collegiate Athletic Association in the Philippines. The men's basketball tournament for the school year 2021-22 began in the second semester on March 26, 2022, and the host school for the season is De La Salle–College of Saint Benilde.

The Knights competed in the NCAA after more than two years since their historic championship run in 2019, and since the COVID-19 pandemic in the Philippines.

The Knights, the Season 95 champions, started the season by winning against season's hosts CSB Blazers in a game played via bubble setting. They swept the single round-robin eliminations, finishing at first place with 9 wins against no losses.

The Knights then survive the gritty fourth-seeded UPHSD Altas in the Final Four and made it back to the NCAA men's basketball Finals. The last time Letran made back-to-back Finals was in 2012 to 2013 seasons.

The Knights went on to defeat the Mapúa Cardinals in two games to capture their 19th championship, clinching their first back-to-back titles since winning in 1998 & 1999 seasons, and sweeping the whole tournament since 1984. Team captain Jeo Ambohot was named Finals Most Valuable Player, Mythical Five member, and All-Defensive team member, while Rhenz Abando bagged Season Most Valuable Player, Rookie of the Year, and was also named in the Mythical Five.

== Roster ==
Letran Knights roster
Players
Coaches

Pos.	No.	Nat.	Name	Height	Year	High School
SG	10	(Philippines)	Abando, Rhenz Joseph M.	6'2" (1.88m)	1st	Bactad East National High School
PF	18	(Philippines)	Ambohot, Jeo R. (C)	6'8" (2.03m)	5th	Agro-Industrial Foundation College of the Philippines
SF	17	(Philippines)	Ariar, Kint Devone I.	6'3" (1.91m)	1st	Saint Dominic Savio Learning Center
SG	27	(Philippines)	Caralipio, King Deniell M.	6'3" (1.91m)	4th	San Pedro High School
PF	12	(Philippines)	Fajarito, Christian A.	6'7" (2.01m)	4th	FEU Diliman
PF	35	(Philippines)	Guarino, Neil Andrey A.	6'6" (1.98m)	2nd	Colegio de San Juan de Letran
C	9	(Philippines)	Javillonar, Marc Paolo J.	6'7" (2.01m)	2nd	Nazareth School of National University
C	15	(Philippines)	Lantaya, Jimly	6'10" (2.08m)	1st	Nazareth School of National University
SG	23	(Philippines)	Mina, Allen Andrew R.	6'3" (1.91m)	2nd	Nazareth School of National University
PG	6	(Philippines)	Olivario, Tommy York G.	5'9" (1.75m)	4th	Colegio de San Juan de Letran
SG	38	(Philippines)	Paraiso, Brent Isaac P.	6'3" (1.91m)	1st	De La Salle Santiago Zobel School
PG	8	(Philippines)	Reyson, Kurt Spencer E.	5'10" (1.78m)	2nd	Colegio de San Juan de Letran
PF	5	(Philippines)	Sangalang, Mark Louie	6'6" (1.98m)	3rd	Academy of Queen Mary School Inc.
SG	7	(United States)	Tolentino, Kyle Dominic P.	6'3" (1.91m)	1st	Colegio de San Juan de Letran
PG	3	(Philippines)	Yu, Fran Louie Y.	5'10" (1.78m)	3rd	Chiang Kai Shek College
PF	Reserve	(Philippines)	Bañez, Shamasneh B.	6'5" (1.96m)	–	Chiang Kai Shek College
SF	Reserve	(Philippines)	Go, Rafael S.	6'5" (1.96m)	–	Chiang Kai Shek College
PG	Reserve	(Philippines)	Mailim, Jeffy P.	5'10" (1.78m)	–	Nazareth School of National University

Head coach

- Bonnie Tan

Assistant coach(es)

- Raymund Tiongco
- Rensy Bajar
- Alfredo Jarencio II
- LA Tenorio

Strength & conditioning coach(es)

- Emilio Rafael Avenido

Team manager

- Waiyip Chong
- Eric Ang

Legend

- (C) Team captain
- Injured

=== Depth chart ===
Pos.	Starting 5	Bench 1	Bench 2
C	Ambohot	Javillonar	Lantaya
PF	Sangalang	Fajarito	Guarino
SF	Mina	Caralipio	Ariar
SG	Paraiso	Abando	Tolentino
PG	Yu	Olivario	Reyson

== Roster changes ==
The Knights lost five of its key players from the 2019 championship team. Jerrick Balanza, Larry Muyang, Edson Batiller, and Christian Balagasay were drafted last 2019 in the Philippine Basketball Association, while Ato Ular is now playing in FilBasket as a pro.

Christian Fajarito, who last played for Letran in 2018, returned in the roster. The Knights also welcomed its two blue chip transferees from the University of Santo Tomas, Rhenz Abando and Brent Paraiso.

== Suspensions ==
- Letran big man Louie Sangalang served a one-game suspension after he was slapped with a disqualifying foul for throwing the ball to the face of Mapúa Cardinals counterpart Warren Bonifacio during their matchup in the elimination round.

== Injuries ==
- Letran star Rhenz Abando suffered a left ankle sprain after a putback dunk that led to a bad fall during their Finals Game 1 matchup against the Mapúa Cardinals. He played the following game and led his team to a championship.

== NCAA Season 97 games results ==
Elimination games are played in a single round-robin format. All games are aired on GTV and GMA Pinoy TV, and streamed online live via the NCAA Philippines website, NCAA Philippines Facebook page and YouTube channel, and GMA Sports’ Facebook and Twitter pages.

Date	Time	Opponent	Venue	Result	Record
Elimination round
Mar 26	3:30 p.m.	Benilde Blazers	St. Benilde Gym–LSGH • Mandaluyong	W 67–63	1–0
Game Highs: Points: Abando – 19; Rebounds: Sangalang – 13; Assists: Abando – 3
Mar 30	12:00 p.m.	Arellano Chiefs	St. Benilde Gym–LSGH • Mandaluyong	W 96–67	2–0
Game Highs: Points: Ambohot – 20; Rebounds: Sangalang – 10; Assists: Olivario – 7
Apr 3	12:00 p.m.	Perpetual Altas	St. Benilde Gym–LSGH • Mandaluyong	W 68–57	3–0
Game Highs: Points: Abando – 24; Rebounds: Ambohot, Fajarito – 11; Assists: Abando, Yu – 4
Apr 8	12:00 p.m.	Mapúa Cardinals	St. Benilde Gym–LSGH • Mandaluyong	W 80–60	4–0
Game Highs: Points: Ambohot – 16; Rebounds: Ambohot – 12; Assists: 3 players – 4 each
Apr 17	3:00 p.m.	Lyceum Pirates	St. Benilde Gym–LSGH • Mandaluyong	W 80–77	5–0
Game Highs: Points: Abando – 14; Rebounds: Ambohot – 13; Assists: Yu – 7
Apr 20	3:00 p.m.	EAC Generals	St. Benilde Gym–LSGH • Mandaluyong	W 83–62	6–0
Game Highs: Points: Paraiso, Reyson – 15; Rebounds: Sangalang – 7; Assists: 4 players – 4 each
Apr 23	3:00 p.m.	JRU Heavy Bombers	St. Benilde Gym–LSGH • Mandaluyong	W 81–59	7–0
Game Highs: Points: Ambohot – 14; Rebounds: Ambohot – 12; Assists: Reyson – 7
Apr 26	3:00 p.m.	San Sebastian Stags	St. Benilde Gym–LSGH • Mandaluyong	W 73–69	8–0
Game Highs: Points: Abando – 18; Rebounds: Abando – 9; Assists: Olivario – 4
Apr 29	3:00 p.m.	San Beda Red Lions	Filoil Flying V Centre • San Juan	W 59–56	9–0
Game Highs: Points: Sangalang – 12; Rebounds: Ambohot – 13; Assists: Yu – 5
1st place after the eliminations (9 wins–0 losses)
Final Four (Note: Letran held a twice-to-beat advantage over UPHSD)
May 8	12:00 p.m.	Perpetual Altas	Filoil Flying V Centre • San Juan	W 77–75	10–0
Game Highs: Points: Abando – 24; Rebounds: Ambohot – 14; Assists: Reyson, Yu – 3
Letran wins series in one game
Finals
May 15	3:00 p.m.	Mapúa Cardinals	Filoil Flying V Centre • San Juan	W 68–63	11–0
Game Highs: Points: Paraiso, Sangalang – 14; Rebounds: Ambohot – 13; Assists: Paraiso, Yu – 5
May 22	3:00 p.m.	Mapúa Cardinals	Filoil Flying V Centre • San Juan	W 75–65	12–0
Game Highs: Points: Abando – 14; Rebounds: Sangalang – 13; Assists: Yu – 5
Knights clinched 19th NCAA championship

Times listed above are in UTC+08:00

Source: Pong Ducanes, Imperium Technology

== Awards ==
Player	Award
Rhenz Abando	NCAA Season Most Valuable Player
Rhenz Abando	NCAA Rookie of the Year
Rhenz Abando	NCAA Mythical Five member
Jeo Ambohot	NCAA Finals Most Valuable Player
Jeo Ambohot	NCAA All-Defensive Team
Jeo Ambohot	NCAA Mythical Five member
