= NCAA Season 98 basketball tournaments =

Basketball season

NCAA Season 98
- "Achieve Greatness Every Day"
- Host school: Emilio Aguinaldo College
| Men's Finals | G1 | G2 | G3 | Wins |
|---|---|---|---|---|
| Benilde Blazers | 75 | 76 | 67 | 1 |
| Letran Knights | 81 | 71 | 81 | 2 |
- Duration: December 4–18, 2022
- Arena(s): Smart Araneta Coliseum (Games 1 & 2); Ynares Center (Game 3)
- Finals MVP: King Caralipio
- Winning coach: Bonnie Tan (3rd title)
- Semifinalists: Lyceum Pirates; San Beda Red Lions
- TV network(s): GMA, GTV
| Juniors' Finals | G1 | G2 | Wins |
|---|---|---|---|
| Letran Squires | 85 | 77 | 2 |
| La Salle Green Hills Greenies | 81 | 61 | 0 |
- Duration: March 13–16, 2023
- Arena(s): San Andres Sports Complex
- Finals MVP: Andy Gemao
- Winning coach: Allen Ricardo (1st title)
- Semifinalists: San Beda Red Cubs; Mapúa Red Robins
- TV network(s): GTV

The NCAA Season 98 basketball tournaments are the basketball tournaments of the National Collegiate Athletic Association (Philippines) for its 2022–23 season. Emilio Aguinaldo College hosted the tournaments for the first time.

The men's tournament was held in September 2022, just over three months after Season 97 ended. The juniors' tournament began in February 2023, the first tournament since Season 95, and the COVID-19 pandemic.

The Letran Knights and Squires won their respective tournaments, winning the first double championship for Letran since 1983.

In the men's tournament, the Benilde Blazers finished first, and defeated the #4 seed San Beda Red Lions in the semifinals. Letran, which finished second, also defeated #3 seed Lyceum Pirates on the other semifinal. Letran defeated Benilde in three games to win their third consecutive title.

In the juniors' tournament, the Letran Squires finished first, with LSGH, Malayan, San Beda and San Sebastian finishing tied from second to fifth. After a series of playoff games, Letran defeated #4 seed Malayan Red Robins, while #2 San Beda Red Cubs lost all of its semifinal games against #3 seed LSGH Greenies. Letran defeated LSGH in two games in the Finals, to win their first title since 2001.

== Tournament format ==
After COVID restrictions limited the elimination round to a single round-robin with the introduction of a play-in tournament in the previous season, Season 98 returned to a double round-robin eliminations for the men's tournament.

Former UAAP basketball commissioner Tonichi Pujante is this season's commissioner.

Just like in Season 97, game days are on Tuesdays, Wednesdays, Fridays, Saturdays and Sundays.

For the juniors' tournament, it is a single round-robin tournament.

== Teams ==
All ten schools are participating.

Men's teams
| Team | College | Men's coach |
|---|---|---|
| Arellano Chiefs | Arellano University (AU) | (Philippines) Cholo Martin |
| Letran Knights | Colegio de San Juan de Letran (CSJL) | (Philippines) Bonnie Tan |
| Benilde Blazers | De La Salle–College of Saint Benilde (CSB) | (Philippines) Charles Tiu |
| EAC Generals | Emilio Aguinaldo College (EAC) | (Philippines) Oliver Bunyi |
| JRU Heavy Bombers | José Rizal University (JRU) | (Philippines) Louie Gonzalez |
| Lyceum Pirates | Lyceum of the Philippines University (LPU) | (Philippines) Gilbert Malabanan |
| Mapúa Cardinals | Mapúa University (MU) | (Philippines) Randy Alcantara |
| San Beda Red Lions | San Beda University (SBU) | (Philippines) Yuri Escueta |
| San Sebastian Stags | San Sebastian College – Recoletos (SSC-R) | (Philippines) Edgar Macaraya |
| Perpetual Altas | University of Perpetual Help System DALTA (UPHSD) | (Philippines) Myk Saguiguit |

Juniors' teams
| Team | High school | Juniors' coach |
|---|---|---|
| Arellano Braves | Arellano University High School (AU) | (Philippines) Junjie Ablan |
| Letran Squires | Colegio de San Juan de Letran (CSJL) | (Philippines) Allen Ricardo |
| EAC-ICA Brigadiers | Immaculate Conception Academy (ICA) | (Philippines) Azlie Guro |
| JRU Light Bombers | José Rizal University (JRU) | (Philippines) Vic Lazaro |
| La Salle Green Hills Greenies | La Salle Green Hills (LSGH) | (Philippines) Renren Ritualo |
| Lyceum Junior Pirates | Lyceum of the Philippines University – Cavite (LPU–C) | (Philippines) JC Docto |
| Mapúa Red Robins | Malayan High School of Science (MHSS) | (Philippines) Yong Garcia |
| San Beda Red Cubs | San Beda University – Rizal (SBU–R) | (Philippines) Miko Roldan |
| San Sebastian Staglets | San Sebastian College – Recoletos (SSC–R) | (Philippines) Juan Miguel Martin |
| Perpetual Junior Altas | University of Perpetual Help System DALTA (UPHSD) | (Philippines) Joph Cleopas |

=== Coaching changes ===
| Team | Outgoing coach | Manner of departure | Date | Replaced by | Date |
|---|---|---|---|---|---|
| Lyceum Junior Pirates | (Philippines) LA Mumar | Mutual consent | November 2019 | (Philippines) Ian Sangco | |
| La Salle Green Hills Greenies | (Philippines) Marvin Bienvenida | Mutual consent | March 28, 2019 | (Philippines) Karl Santos | March 30, 2019 |
| Perpetual Junior Altas | (Philippines) Myk Saguiguit | Signed with Perpetual Altas | December 2, 2020 | (Philippines) Joph Cleopas | December 2, 2020 |
| San Beda Red Lions | (Philippines) Boyet Fernandez | Demoted | July 26, 2022 | (Philippines) Yuri Escueta | July 27, 2022 |
| La Salle Green Hills Greenies | (Philippines) Karl Santos | Fired | June 15, 2022 | (Philippines) Renren Ritualo | July 29, 2022 |
| San Beda Red Cubs | (Philippines) Manu Inigo | Fired | October 28, 2022 | (Philippines) Miko Roldan | January 12, 2023 |
| San Sebastian Staglets | (Philippines) Mel Banua | Fired | December 15, 2022 | (Philippines) Juan Miguel Martin | January 6, 2023 |

== Venues ==
Basketball venues (red for seniors' venues, blue for juniors' venues)

For the men's tournament, Araneta Coliseum in Quezon City hosted the opening day, while Filoil EcoOil Centre in San Juan hosted the remainder of the elimination round. Filoil EcoOil Centre hosted the semifinals, while the NCAA returned to the Araneta Coliseum for the first two games of the Finals. Game 3 of the Finals was held at the Ynares Center in Antipolo, Rizal.

For the juniors' tournament, the Emilio Aguinaldo College Gym in Manila hosted the elimination round, except for the final gameday, which was held at the nearby San Andres Sports Complex, which then hosted all of the playoff games.

| Arena | Location | Tournament | | Capacity |
| Arena | Location | Men | Jrs | Capacity |
|---|---|---|---|---|
| Araneta Coliseum | Quezon City | check | | 14,429 |
| Emilio Aguinaldo College Gym | Manila | | check | 250 |
| Filoil EcoOil Centre | San Juan | check | | 6,000 |
| San Andres Sports Complex | Manila | | check | 3,000 |
| Ynares Center | Antipolo, Rizal | check | | 7,400 |

== Squads ==
Each team can have up to 15 players on their roster, with an additional up to three players in the injured reserve list.

The ban of foreign student-athletes first applied in Season 96 (2020) is still in effect, requiring all players to be Filipinos.

== Men's tournament ==
The traditional champion vs. season host opening game on September 10 was scrapped when four Letran Knights players contracted COVID-19; replacing that match-up is season hosts EAC going up against the Arellano Chiefs; the host vs. champion game will instead be the final game of the first round. (Subsequent postponements have made this not the final game of the first round.)

=== Elimination round ===
==== Team standings ====
| Pos | Team | W | L | PCT | GB | Qualification |
|---|---|---|---|---|---|---|
| 1 | Benilde Blazers | 14 | 4 | .778 | — | Twice-to-beat in the semifinals |
| 2 | Letran Knights | 13 | 5 | .722 | 1 | Twice-to-beat in the semifinals |
| 3 | Lyceum Pirates | 12 | 6 | .667 (Note: Head-to-head record: Lyceum 2–0 San Beda) | 2 | Twice-to-win in the semifinals |
| 4 | San Beda Red Lions | 12 | 6 | .667 | 2 | Twice-to-win in the semifinals |
| 5 | San Sebastian Stags | 8 | 10 | .444 | 6 | |
| 6 | Arellano Chiefs | 7 | 11 | .389 (Note: Head-to-head record: Arellano 4–2, Mapua 3–3, Perpetual 3–3 (Mapua 1–1 Perpetual, Mapua +6), JRU 2–4) | 7 | |
| 7 | Mapúa Cardinals (Note: NCAA Management Committee reversed Mapúa's win over San Beda in their first round game, ruling it as a 20–0 forfeit win for San Beda after Mapúa fielded an ineligible player in Gab Gamboa. He was found to have been enrolled in another school outside the NCAA.) | 7 | 11 | .389 | 7 | |
| 8 | Perpetual Altas | 7 | 11 | .389 | 7 | |
| 9 | JRU Heavy Bombers | 7 | 11 | .389 | 7 | |
| 10 | EAC Generals (H) | 3 | 15 | .167 | 11 | |

Source: GMA
Rules for classification: 1) winning percentage; 2) head-to-head record; 3) overall point differential
(H) Hosts

==== Match-up results ====
Two first-round games, Benilde vs. JRU, and JRU vs. San Sebastian, were rescheduled on the early part of the second round. On this table, they're shown as if they occurred before the second round started.

| | Round 1 | | | | | | | | | Round 2 | | | | | | | | |
| Team ╲ Game | 1 | 2 | 3 | 4 | 5 | 6 | 7 | 8 | 9 | 10 | 11 | 12 | 13 | 14 | 15 | 16 | 17 | 18 |
|---|---|---|---|---|---|---|---|---|---|---|---|---|---|---|---|---|---|---|
| Arellano | EAC school colors | SSC-R school colors | UPHD school colors | Letran school colors | JRU school colors | CSB school colors | Mapua school colors | San Beda school colors | Lyceum school colors | Letran school colors | Lyceum school colors | JRU school colors | San Beda school colors | SSC-R school colors | Mapua school colors | UPHD school colors | CSB school colors | EAC school colors |
| Letran | JRU school colors | Arellano school colors | CSB school colors | Mapua school colors | San Beda school colors | Lyceum school colors | SSC-R school colors | UPHD school colors | EAC school colors | UPHD school colors | Arellano school colors | SSC-R school colors | Lyceum school colors | CSB school colors | EAC school colors | San Beda school colors | Mapua school colors | JRU school colors |
| Benilde | Lyceum school colors | SSC-R school colors | UPHD school colors | Letran school colors | Arellano school colors | EAC school colors | Mapua school colors | San Beda school colors | JRU school colors | EAC school colors | Mapua school colors | Letran school colors | JRU school colors | UPHD school colors | SSC-R school colors | Lyceum school colors | Arellano school colors | San Beda school colors |
| EAC | Arellano school colors | San Beda school colors | JRU school colors | Lyceum school colors | CSB school colors | UPHD school colors | Mapua school colors | Letran school colors | SSC-R school colors | CSB school colors | Lyceum school colors | Mapua school colors | San Beda school colors | JRU school colors | UPHD school colors | Letran school colors | SSC-R school colors | Arellano school colors |
| JRU | UPHD school colors | Letran school colors | EAC school colors | Arellano school colors | Mapua school colors | San Beda school colors | Lyceum school colors | CSB school colors | SSC-R school colors | Mapua school colors | EAC school colors | Arellano school colors | CSB school colors | SSC-R school colors | UPHD school colors | Lyceum school colors | San Beda school colors | Letran school colors |
| Lyceum | CSB school colors | Mapua school colors | San Beda school colors | EAC school colors | UPHD school colors | Letran school colors | JRU school colors | SSC-R school colors | Arellano school colors | Mapua school colors | EAC school colors | Arellano school colors | Letran school colors | UPHD school colors | San Beda school colors | SSC-R school colors | JRU school colors | CSB school colors |
| Mapúa | San Beda school colors | Lyceum school colors | SSC-R school colors | UPHD school colors | Letran school colors | JRU school colors | Arellano school colors | CSB school colors | EAC school colors | Lyceum school colors | CSB school colors | EAC school colors | UPHD school colors | JRU school colors | Arellano school colors | San Beda school colors | Letran school colors | SSC-R school colors |
| San Beda | Mapua school colors | EAC school colors | Lyceum school colors | SSC-R school colors | Letran school colors | JRU school colors | Arellano school colors | CSB school colors | UPHD school colors | UPHD school colors | EAC school colors | Arellano school colors | SSC-R school colors | Lyceum school colors | Mapua school colors | Letran school colors | JRU school colors | CSB school colors |
| San Sebastian | Arellano school colors | CSB school colors | Mapua school colors | San Beda school colors | UPHD school colors | Letran school colors | Lyceum school colors | EAC school colors | JRU school colors | Letran school colors | Arellano school colors | San Beda school colors | JRU school colors | Lyceum school colors | CSB school colors | UPHD school colors | EAC school colors | Mapua school colors |
| Perpetual | JRU school colors | Arellano school colors | CSB school colors | Mapua school colors | Lyceum school colors | SSC-R school colors | EAC school colors | Letran school colors | San Beda school colors | Letran school colors | San Beda school colors | Mapua school colors | Lyceum school colors | EAC school colors | CSB school colors | JRU school colors | Arellano school colors | SSC-R school colors |

Source: GMA
= Win; = OT win; = Win by forfeit; = Loss; = OT loss; = Loss by forfeit

===== Postponed games =====
- Letran vs. EAC rescheduled after four Letran players tested positive for COVID-19.
- San Sebastian's games vs. Lyceum and EAC rescheduled after six San Sebastian players tested positive for COVID-19.
- September 25 games (JRU vs. Benilde and San Beda vs. Perpetual) were rescheduled due to Super Typhoon Karding.
- JRU's games vs. San Sebastian and Benilde after JRU players tested positive for COVID-19. The JRU vs. San Sebastian game has been rescheduled thrice.
- San Beda vs Arellano rescheduled after Arellano players tested positive for COVID-19.
- Games on October 29 (Arellano vs. EAC and San Beda vs. Benilde) and October 30 (Mapua vs. San Sebastian and JRU vs. Letran) have been postponed due to Tropical Storm Paeng.

==== Scores ====
Results on top and to the right of the grey cells are for first-round games; those to the bottom and to the left of it are second-round games.

| Teams | AU | CSJL | CSB | EAC | JRU | LPU | MU | SBU | SSC-R | UPHSD |
|---|---|---|---|---|---|---|---|---|---|---|
| Arellano Chiefs | | 72–69 | 72–84 | 63–58 | 67–70 | 80–82 | 64–59 | 61–96 | 51–60 | 61–59 |
| Letran Knights | 65–53 | | 81–75 | 72–68 | 101–97* | 75–82 | 67–62 | 68–76 | 77–69 | 70–67 |
| Benilde Blazers | 83–73 | 66–74 | | 73–61 | 92–79 | 86–69 | 73–64 | 78–69 | 100–94 | 81–64 |
| EAC Generals | 63–62* | 77–84 | 80–75 | | 74–97 | 67–74 | 55–67 | 56–85 | 61–78 | 54–55 |
| JRU Heavy Bombers | 52–62 | 87–71 | 51–71 (Note: Benilde was leading 71–51 with 3:22 remaining in the fourth quarter when JRU player John Amores charged the Benilde bench and assaulted several Benilde players, which caused the game to be halted. After a long pause, the NCAA Management Committee abandoned the game and awarded Benilde the win, keeping the score before the game was halted.) | 61–60 | | 63–57 | 67–64* | 83–80 | 68–72 | 60–84 |
| Lyceum Pirates | 63–77 | 64–69 | 88–100 | 79–73 | 79–62 | | 76–67 | 89–81 | 82–79* | 82–77 |
| Mapúa Cardinals | 67–47 | 58–74 | 72–85 | 77–67 | 74–49 | 62–59 | | 0–20 (Note: Mapúa originally won 66–55. The NCAA Management Committee reversed Mapúa's win over San Beda after the Cardinals were found to have fielded an ineligible player in Gab Gamboa, awarding San Beda with a 20–0 win.) | 56–57 | 77–79 |
| San Beda Red Lions | 76–63 | 91–77 | 73–82 | 72–64 | 70–61 | 80–81 | 71–63 | | 78–71 | 71–52 |
| San Sebastian Stags | 71–66 | 50–69 | 78–83 | 62–59 | 92–74 | 65–73 | 67–75 | 79–82* | | 57–61 |
| Perpetual Altas | 81–86 | 59–74 | 89–83 | 53–59 | 72–60 | 82–86 | 65–73 | 75–72* | 74–78 | |

Source: GMA
Legend: Blue = left column team win; Red = top row team win.
Matches with lighter background shading were decided after overtime.

=== Bracket ===
Semifinals (Top 2 twice-to-beat)
1 | Benilde | 62
4 | San Beda | 61
2 | Letran | 67
3 | Lyceum | 58

Finals (Best-of-three series)
1 | Benilde | 75 | 76 | 67
2 | Letran | 81 | 71 | 81

=== Semifinals ===
Letran and Benilde will have the twice-to-beat advantage; with them having to win only once, and while their opponents twice, to advance.

==== (1) Benilde vs. (4) San Beda ====
The Benilde Blazers qualified to its first Final Four in 20 years. San Beda made it to its 17th consecutive Final Four appearance.

GTV

November 29
12:00 p.m.

Box score

| Benilde Blazers | 62–61 | San Beda Red Lions |
Scoring by quarter: 19–14, 15–17, 20–17, 8–13
| Pts: Miguel Oczon 17; Rebs: Miguel Corteza 12; Asts: Miguel Oczon 4 | | Pts: Jacob Cortez 13; Rebs: Kwekuteye, Ynot 9 each Asts: Cortez, Kwekuteye 2 each |
Benilde wins series in one game

Filoil EcoOil Centre, San Juan
Referees: Harry Santos (IR), Aaron Cañete (IR), Carlo Sebastian (NR)

==== (2) Letran vs. (3) Lyceum ====
The Letran Knights qualified to its fourth consecutive Final Four. The Lyceum Pirates clinched a Final Four berth after missing out in Season 97.

GTV

November 29
3:00 p.m.

Box score

| Letran Knights | 67–58 | Lyceum Pirates |
Scoring by quarter: 13–17, 17–11, 20–17, 17–13
| Pts: Fran Yu 11; Rebs: King Caralipio 12; Asts: King Caralipio 5 | | Pts: Enoch Valdez 15; Rebs: Enoch Valdez 11; Asts: Renzo Navarro 4 |
Letran wins series in one game

Filoil EcoOil Centre, San Juan
Referees: Mike Tolentino (IR), Totie Celeste (IR), Jemar Talledo (NR)

=== Finals ===
The Finals is a best-of-three series. Benilde qualified to its first Finals appearance in 20 years, while Letran qualified to its third consecutive Finals.

GMA
GTV

December 4
3:00 p.m.

Box score

| Benilde Blazers | 75–81 | Letran Knights |
Scoring by quarter: 21–25, 29–27, 17–14, 8–15
| Pts: Will Gozum 19; Rebs: Will Gozum 11; Asts: Pasturan, Cullar 5 each | | Pts: Louie Sangalang 24; Rebs: Louie Sangalang 10; Asts: Fran Yu 5 |

Araneta Coliseum, Quezon City
Attendance: 8,284
Referees: Rey Hufana (IR), Glenn Cornelio (IR), Aaron Cañete (IR)

GMA
GTV

December 11
3:00 p.m.

Box score

| Benilde Blazers | 76–71 | Letran Knights |
Scoring by quarter: 20–23, 14–22, 30–14, 12–12
| Pts: Corteza, Gozum 21 each Rebs: Corteza, Gozum 10 each Asts: 3 players, 4 each | | Pts: Brent Paraiso 16; Rebs: King Caralipio 14; Asts: Tom Olivario 6 |

Araneta Coliseum, Quezon City
Referees: Glenn Cornelio (IR), Harry Santos (IR), Totie Celeste (IR)

GMA
GTV

December 18
3:00 p.m.

Box score

| Benilde Blazers | 67–81 | Letran Knights |
Scoring by quarter: 21–24, 12–27, 21–19, 13–11
| Pts: Miguel Corteza 14; Rebs: 3 players, 7 each Asts: James Pasturan 6 | | Pts: King Caralipio 20; Rebs: King Caralipio 10; Asts: Monje, Olivario 3 each |
Letran wins series, 2–1

Ynares Center, Antipolo, Rizal
Referees: Joenard Garcia (IR), Aaron Cañete (IR), Glenn Cornelio (IR)

- Finals Most Valuable Player: King Caralipio (Letran Knights)
- Coach of the Year: Bonnie Tan (Letran Knights)

=== All-Star Game ===
The annual GMA-NCAA All-Star Game was on October 15, 2022, at the Filoil EcoOil Centre. Each team had celebrities and basketball legends. The basketball legends in Team Heroes were Allan Caidic and Jerry Codiñera, while Team Saints had Marlou Aquino and Willie Miller.

GTV

October 15
2:30 p.m.

Box score

| Team Saints | 95–98 | Team Heroes |
Scoring by quarter: 24–35, 28–17, 28–20, 15–26
| Pts: James Kwekuteye 15; Rebs: JB Bahio 10; Asts: James Kwekuteye 5 | | Pts: Nat Cosejo 16; Rebs: Warren Bonifacio 11; Asts: Renzo Navarro 7 |

Filoil EcoOil Centre, San Juan
Referees: Kent Tabora (NR), Rimmon Madera (NR), Fernan Nakila (NR)

- All-Star Game MVP: Nat Cosejo (Team Heroes)
- Celebrity MVP: Raheel Bhyria (Team Heroes)

=== Awards ===
NCAA Season 98 men's basketball champions
Letran Knights
20th title, third consecutive title

The awards were handed out prior to Game 2 of the Finals at the Araneta Coliseum.

- Most Valuable Player: Will Gozum (Benilde Blazers)
- Rookie of the Year: Cade Flores (Arellano Chiefs)
- Mythical Five:
  - Will Gozum (Benilde Blazers)
  - Cade Flores (Arellano Chiefs)
  - JB Bahio (San Beda Red Lions)
  - James Kwekuteye (San Beda Red Lions)
  - King Caralipio (Letran Knights)
- Defensive Player of the Year: Cade Flores (Arellano Chiefs)
- All-Defensive Team:
  - Cade Flores (Arellano Chiefs)
  - JB Bahio (San Beda Red Lions)
  - Will Gozum (Benilde Blazers)
  - Mark Omega (Perpetual Altas)
  - Romel Calahat (San Sebastian Stags)
- Most Improved Player: Shawn Umali (Lyceum Pirates)
- Sportsmanship Award: San Beda Red Lions

==== Players of the Week ====
The Collegiate Press Corps awards a "player of the week" on Mondays for performances on the preceding week.

| Week | Player | Team |
|---|---|---|
| Week 1 | Cade Flores | Arellano Chiefs |
| Week 2 | Will Gozum | Benilde Blazers |
| Week 3 | Mac Guadaña | Lyceum Pirates |
| Week 4 | Miguel Oczon | Benilde Blazers |
| Week 5 | Nat Cosejo | EAC Generals |
| Week 6 | Fran Yu | Letran Knights |
| Week 7 | Will Gozum | Benilde Blazers |
| Week 8 | JB Bahio | San Beda Red Lions |
| Week 9 | Enoch Valdez | Lyceum Pirates |
| Week 10 | Will Gozum | Benilde Blazers |

=== Statistical leaders ===
Statistical leaders' averages after the elimination round.

==== Season player highs ====
| Statistic | Player | Team | Average |
|---|---|---|---|
| Points per game | Will Gozum | Benilde Blazers | 17.17 |
| Rebounds per game | Cade Flores | Arellano Chiefs | 10.07 |
| Assists per game | Renzo Navarro | Lyceum Pirates | 5.41 |
| Steals per game | Fran Yu | Letran Knights | 2.17 |
| Blocks per game | Shawn Umali | Lyceum Pirates | 1.94 |
| Field goal percentage | Nat Cosejo | EAC Generals | 55.15% |
| Three-point field goal percentage | Rhinwil Yambing | San Sebastian Stags | 45.83% |
| Free throw percentage | Robi Nayve | Benilde Blazers | 87.5% |
| Turnovers per game | Ichie Altamirano | San Sebastian Stags | 3.33 |

==== Team game highs ====
| Statistic | Team | Total | Opponent |
|---|---|---|---|
| Points | Letran Knights | 101 (Note: Game went into overtime.) | JRU Heavy Bombers |
| Points | Benilde Blazers | 100 (Note: Game ended in regulation time.) | Lyceum Pirates |
| Points | Benilde Blazers | 100 | San Sebastian Stags |
| Rebounds | Perpetual Altas | 60 | Benilde Blazers |
| Assists | Perpetual Altas | 31 | EAC Generals |
| Steals | Letran Knights | 15 | Benilde Blazers |
| Blocks | Lyceum Pirates | 8 | Benilde Blazers |
| Blocks | Lyceum Pirates | 8 | JRU Heavy Bombers |
| Blocks | San Beda Red Lions | 8 | Letran Knights |
| Blocks | Perpetual Altas | 8 | Arellano Chiefs |
| Blocks | San Beda Red Lions | 8 | EAC Generals |
| Field goal percentage | Perpetual Altas | 56.0% | Benilde Blazers |
| Three-point field goal percentage | San Sebastian Stags | 51.0% | JRU Heavy Bombers |
| Free throw percentage | EAC Generals | 100% | Perpetual Altas |
| Free throw percentage | Letran Knights | 100% | San Beda Red Lions |
| Turnovers | JRU Heavy Bombers | 30 | Perpetual Altas |

==== Team season highs ====
| Statistic | Team | Average |
|---|---|---|
| Points per game | Benilde Blazers | 81.67 |
| Rebounds per game | Perpetual Altas | 48.56 |
| Assists per game | Benilde Blazers | 19.44 |
| Steals per game | Lyceum Pirates | 8.0 |
| Blocks per game | Lyceum Pirates | 4.72 |
| Field goal percentage | Benilde Blazers | 42.09% |
| Three-point field goal percentage | Letran Knights | 31.29% |
| Free throw percentage | Perpetual Altas | 62.37% |
| Turnovers per game | Arellano Chiefs | 15.61 |

=== Discipline ===
The following were suspended throughout the course of the season:

- Brent Paraiso of the Letran Knights for a disqualifying foul against the Mapúa Cardinals. Served one-game suspension against the San Beda Red Lions.
  - Paraiso was given another one-game suspension, this time on their game against the Lyceum Pirates, for actions detrimental to the league.
- Louie Sangalang of the Letran Knights for two technical fouls against the Mapúa Cardinals. Served one-game suspension against the San Beda Red Lions.
  - Sangalang was given another one-game suspension, this time on their game against the Lyceum Pirates, for actions detrimental to the league.
- There were reports that Gab Gamboa of the Mapúa Cardinals was banned in the NCAA for life for being an ineligible player after being enrolled in another school (St. Clare College of Caloocan) outside of the NCAA. Gamboa had already withdrew from the team on September 18. The ban was supposedly reported on October 1. Last time while the Mapúa Cardinals wins on this opening day last September 10, 2022 at the score of 66-55 + the San Beda Red Lions will go up to 4-1 win and Mapúa Cardinals 0-6, the NCAA denied that there were penalties already meted on Gamboa himself, with only the forfeiture being confirmed.
- Ralph Robin and King Gurtiza of the EAC Generals was suspended for the rest of the season, while Art Cosa and Joshua Tolentino were suspended for an undisclosed number of games, by the team for unspecified "team violations". The announcement was prior to the start of the second round.
- Kim Aurin of the Perpetual Altas was suspended for one game against the Letran Knights by the team for unspecified "team violations." Aurin later the left the team midseason and signed with Barangay Ginebra San Miguel 3x3.
- Jacob Shanoda of the San Sebastian Stags for an unsportsmanlike foul against the Letran Knights. Served one-game suspension against the Mapua Cardinals.
- John Amores of the JRU Heavy Bombers was suspended indefinitely for the following acts: intentionally bumping the referee, pointing a finger at the referee, disrespecting the NCAA Management Committee (MANCOM) representative, disrespecting court officials, charging towards the bench of CSB, instigating a brawl, making provocative gestures meant to ignite a fight or brawl, and throwing punches against four Benilde players.
  - JRU also suspended Amores indefinitely, adding that he will no longer play in the remainder of the current season, and would no longer participate in team activities.
  - A week after the incident, JRU announced that Amores has been permanently removed from the team.
- Mark Sangco and CJ Flores of the Benilde Blazers were suspended for two games against the Perpetual Altas and the San Sebastian Stags for disrespecting MANCOM representatives during the Amores incident.
- Ryan Arenal and William Sy of the JRU Heavy Bombers were suspended for two games against the San Sebastian Stags and Perpetual Altas for disrespecting ManCom representatives, and Sy was also suspended another game against the Lyceum Pirates for leaving the bench during the Amores incident.
- Jason Tan, Joshua Guiab, Jason Celis, Marwin Dionisio, Jan Abaoag, Jonathan Medina, Karl de Jesus and Christian Gonzales of the JRU Heavy Bombers were suspended for one game against the San Sebastian Stags for entering the court without recognition from table officials during the Amores incident.
- Ladis Lepalam of the Benilde Blazers was suspended for one game against the Perpetual Altas for entering the court without recognition from table officials during the Amores incident.
- Renzo Navarro of the Lyceum Pirates who was ejected in their game against San Sebastian Stags. Served one-game suspension against the JRU Heavy Bombers.
- The three referees who handled the aforementioned incident during the JRU vs. Benilde game were placed under preventive suspension.
- Coach Edgar Macaraya of the San Sebastian Stags was supposed to be suspended for one game for a disqualifying foul for excessive complaining during their game against the Benilde Blazers, but was lifted by the Commissioner's Office; instead, the referees for that game were indefinitely suspended.
- Kobe Monje of the Letran Knights, who was ejected in Game 1 of the Finals against Benilde. Will serve a one-game suspension in Game 2.
- Kyle Tolentino of the Letran Knights will serve a one-game suspension on Game 2 of the Finals after it was found that he was occupying the landing spot of Miguel Oczon of the Benilde Blazers, which resulted in an injury.
- Paolo Javillonar of the Letran Knights was reprimanded for his unsportsmanlike behavior when he touched the private part of Will Gozum of the Benilde Blazers and warned that a repetition or commission of a similar offense will merit a stricter penalty. He is to issue a public apology and render community service "as a rehabilitative measure."
- Fran Yu of the Letran Knights was suspended in the Finals' Game 3 due to a disqualifying foul against Benilde Blazers on the second quarter of Game 2. Letran appealed the suspension to the Management Committee, but was denied.
- Brent Paraiso of the Letran Knights was reprimanded for disrespecting game officials in the Finals' Game 2. Video shown Paraiso participating in a chant badmouthing the referees after Yu was ejected.

== Juniors' tournament ==
The juniors' tournament, last held in 2019 (Season 95), began on February 1, 2023.

The juniors' tournament will also be a qualifying tournament for the 2023 National Basketball Training Center (NBTC) championship, with the champions qualifying. However, with the NCAA championship series being held in the same week as the NBTC championship, the NBTC decided to give the berths given to the NCAA to its losing semifinalists.

=== Elimination round ===
==== Team standings ====
| Pos | Team | W | L | PCT | GB | Qualification |
|---|---|---|---|---|---|---|
| 1 | Letran Squires | 8 | 1 | .889 | — | Twice-to-beat in the semifinals |
| 2 | San Beda Red Cubs | 6 | 3 | .667 (Note: Head-to-head differential: LSGH +23, Malayan +16, San Beda −5, San Sebastian −34; playoff #1: San Beda 93–80 San Sebastian; playoff #2: San Beda 86–75 Malayan (Malayan #4); playoff #3: San Beda 83–77 LSGH (San Beda #2; LSGH #3)) | 2 | Twice-to-beat in the semifinals |
| 3 | La Salle Green Hills Greenies | 6 | 3 | .667 | 2 | Twice-to-win in the semifinals |
| 4 | Mapúa Red Robins | 6 | 3 | .667 | 2 | Twice-to-win in the semifinals |
| 5 | San Sebastian Staglets | 6 | 3 | .667 | 2 | |
| 6 | Perpetual Junior Altas | 4 | 5 | .444 | 4 | |
| 7 | Arellano Braves | 3 | 6 | .333 (Note: Head-to-head differential: Arellano +14, Lyceum −5, JRU −9) | 5 | |
| 8 | Lyceum Junior Pirates | 3 | 6 | .333 | 5 | |
| 9 | JRU Light Bombers | 3 | 6 | .333 | 5 | |
| 10 | EAC–ICA Brigadiers (H) | 0 | 9 | .000 | 8 | |

Source: NCAA on Livestats
Rules for classification: 1) Winning percentage; 2) if tied for #2 or #4, one-game playoff; 3) if two teams are tied, head-to-head record, if three or more teams are tied, head-to-head point differential
(H) Hosts

==== Match-up results ====
| Team ╲ Game | 1 | 2 | 3 | 4 | 5 | 6 | 7 | 8 | 9 |
|---|---|---|---|---|---|---|---|---|---|
| Arellano | UPHD school colors | SSC-R school colors | JRU school colors | CSB school colors | Letran school colors | Mapua school colors | San Beda school colors | EAC school colors | Lyceum school colors |
| Letran | SSC-R school colors | San Beda school colors | EAC school colors | UPHD school colors | Arellano school colors | JRU school colors | Lyceum school colors | CSB school colors | Mapua school colors |
| EAC–ICA | JRU school colors | Lyceum school colors | Letran school colors | SSC-R school colors | UPHD school colors | CSB school colors | Mapua school colors | Arellano school colors | San Beda school colors |
| JRU | EAC school colors | Mapua school colors | Arellano school colors | Lyceum school colors | SSC-R school colors | Letran school colors | CSB school colors | San Beda school colors | UPHD school colors |
| LSGH | Mapua school colors | UPHD school colors | Lyceum school colors | Arellano school colors | San Beda school colors | EAC school colors | JRU school colors | Letran school colors | SSC-R school colors |
| Lyceum–Cavite | San Beda school colors | EAC school colors | CSB school colors | JRU school colors | Mapua school colors | SSC-R school colors | Letran school colors | UPHD school colors | Arellano school colors |
| Malayan | CSB school colors | JRU school colors | UPHD school colors | San Beda school colors | Lyceum school colors | Arellano school colors | EAC school colors | SSC-R school colors | Letran school colors |
| San Beda–Rizal | Lyceum school colors | Letran school colors | SSC-R school colors | Mapua school colors | CSB school colors | UPHD school colors | Arellano school colors | JRU school colors | EAC school colors |
| San Sebastian | Letran school colors | Arellano school colors | San Beda school colors | EAC school colors | JRU school colors | Lyceum school colors | UPHD school colors | Mapua school colors | CSB school colors |
| Perpetual | Arellano school colors | CSB school colors | Mapua school colors | Letran school colors | EAC school colors | San Beda school colors | SSC-R school colors | Lyceum school colors | JRU school colors |

Updated to match(es) played on February 8, 2023. Source: NCAA on Livestats
= Win; = OT win; = Loss; = OT loss

==== Scores ====
Results on top and to the right of the solid cells are for first round games.

| Teams | AU | CSJL | EAC-ICA | JRU | LSGH | LPU-C | MHSS | SBU-R | SSC-R | UPHSD |
|---|---|---|---|---|---|---|---|---|---|---|
| Arellano Braves | | 75–63 | 73–66 | 55–56 | 69–73 | 91–76 | 68–70 | 53–82 | 69–72 | 69–71 |
| Letran Squires | — | | 116–82 | 94–76 | 79–73 | 87–75 | 85–67 | 94–68 | 91–86 | 97–89 |
| EAC-ICA Brigadiers | — | — | | 58–70 | 80–99 | 78–89 | 63–86 | 74–94 | 51–82 | 81–96 |
| JRU Light Bombers | — | — | — | | 69–79 | 77–87 | 62–76 | 66–69 | 70–81 | 88–74 |
| La Salle Green Hills Greenies | — | — | — | — | | 95–84 | 70–74* | 87–84 | 98–74 | 78–82 |
| Lyceum Junior Pirates | — | — | — | — | — | | 70–66 | 74–94 | 87–92 | 97–100 |
| Malayan Red Robins | — | — | — | — | — | — | | 76–62 | 58–60 | 75–66 |
| San Beda Red Cubs | — | — | — | — | — | — | — | | 93–81 | 96–87 |
| San Sebastian Stags | — | — | — | — | — | — | — | — | | 84–69 |
| Perpetual Junior Altas | — | — | — | — | — | — | — | — | — | |

Updated to match(es) played on February 8, 2023. Source: NCAA on Livestats
Legend: Blue = left column team win; Red = top row team win.
Matches with lighter background shading were decided after overtime.

=== Classification playoffs ===
A four-way tie for the second seed needed a series of one-game playoff games to determine the final seedings.

Playoff #1
San Beda–Rizal | 93
San Sebastian | 80

Playoff #2
Malayan | 75
San Beda–Rizal | 86

Playoff #3
LSGH | 77
San Beda–Rizal | 83

==== Playoff #1 ====
The winner advances to the next round and is guaranteed of no less than a #4 seed, the loser is eliminated.

GTV

February 23
2:30 p.m.

Box score

| San Beda Red Cubs | 93–80 | San Sebastian Staglets |
Scoring by quarter: 16– 21, 29–20, 23–16, 25–23
| Pts: Chris Hubilla 21; Rebs: Chris Hubilla 19; Asts: Andrei Dungo 10 | | Pts: Mark De Leon 23; Rebs: Mark De Leon 12; Asts: Ernest Geronimo 5 |
San Beda advances to the Final Four

San Andres Sports Complex, Manila
Referees: Mike Tolentino (IR), Ribel Cañelas (NR), Jemar Talledo (NR)

==== Playoff #2 ====
The winner advances to the next round; the loser is relegated to the 4th seed.

GTV

February 27
2:30 p.m.

Box score

| Mapúa Red Robins | 75–86 | San Beda Red Cubs |
Scoring by quarter: 13–16, 21–18, 11–25, 30–27
| Pts: Gonzales, Morenos 12 each Rebs: Lance Masiglat 8 Asts: Nygel Gonzales 5 | | Pts: Chris Hubilla 22; Rebs: Niño Mundas 10; Asts: Andrei Dungo 5 |

San Andres Sports Complex, Manila
Referees: Totie Celeste (IR), Carlo Sebastian (NR), James Paez (NR)

==== Playoff #3 ====
The winner is the 2nd seed and clinches the twice to beat advantage at the semifinals; the loser is the third seed. This is a de facto game 1 of a best-of-three series between LSGH and San Beda.

GTV

March 2
2:30 p.m.

Box score

| La Salle Green Hills Greenies | 77–83 | San Beda Red Cubs |
Scoring by quarter: 15–16, 27–22, 16–22, 19–23
| Pts: Seven Gagate 21; Rebs: Gagate, Pablo 16 each Asts: Seven Gagate 4 | | Pts: Jharmaine Lecciones 25; Rebs: Chris Hubilla 19; Asts: Chris Hubilla 4 |
San Beda wins the twice-to-beat advantage

San Andres Sports Complex, Manila
Referees: Harry Santos (IR), Carlo Sebastian (NR), Jakeson Mabandos (NR)

=== Bracket ===
Semifinals (Top 2 twice-to-beat)
1 | Letran | 83
4 | Malayan | 78
2 | San Beda–Rizal | 79 | 85
3 | LSGH | 92 | 89

Finals (Best-of-three series)
1 | Letran | 85 | 77
3 | LSGH | 81 | 61

=== Semifinals ===
The top two teams have the twice-to-beat advantage, where they have to be beaten twice, while their opponents just once, to be eliminated.

==== (1) Letran vs. (4) Malayan ====
Letran was the first team to clinch a semifinal berth. Malayan qualified to the Final Four by having the second best tiebreaker among the teams tied for second to fourth.

GTV

March 6
12:00 p.m.

Box score

| Letran Squires | 83–78 | Mapúa Red Robins |
Scoring by quarter: 17–19, 24–19, 21–12, 21–28
| Pts: Andy Gemao 14; Rebs: George Diamante 14; Asts: Jonathan Manalili 6 | | Pts: Nygel Gonzales 21; Rebs: Noel Agemenyi 6 Asts: Nygel Gonzales 3 |
Letran wins series in one game

San Andres Sports Complex, Manila
Referees: Glenn Cornelio (IR), Carlo Sebastian (NR), Jemar Talledo (NR)

==== (2) San Beda vs. (3) LSGH ====
LSGH qualified to the semifinals by virtue of having the best tiebreaker among the four teams tied from second to fourth. San Beda qualified to the Final Four by eliminating San Sebastian in the first classification playoff.

GTV

March 6
2:30 p.m.

Box score

| San Beda Red Cubs | 79–92 | La Salle Green Hills Greenies |
Scoring by quarter: 16–22, 32–26, 10–26, 21–18
| Pts: Chris Hubilla 34; Rebs: Chris Hubilla 15; Asts: Chris Hubilla 2 | | Pts: Seven Gagate 24; Rebs: Rod Alian 8 Asts: Rod Alian 5 |

San Andres Sports Complex, Manila
Referees: Totie Celeste (IR), Mike Tolentino (IR), Ralph Moreto (NR)

GTV

March 9
2:30 p.m.

Box score

| San Beda Red Cubs | 85–89 | La Salle Green Hills Greenies |
Scoring by quarter: 19–22, 22–24, 21–17, 23–26
| Pts: Chris Hubilla 37; Rebs: Chris Hubilla 14; Asts: Gab Ludovice 5 | | Pts: Luis Pablo 25; Rebs: Luis Pablo 19; Asts: Rod Alian 6 |
LSGH wins series in two games

San Andres Sports Complex, Manila
Referees: Glenn Cornelio (IR), Totie Celeste (IR), Carlo Sebastian (NR)

=== Finals ===
This is a best-of-three playoff.

Letran qualified to the championship round for the first time since 2009. LSGH clinched its first Finals berth since 2018.

GTV

March 13
2:30 p.m.

Box score

| Letran Squires | 85–81 | La Salle Green Hills Greenies |
Scoring by quarter: 17–22, 24–22, 24–20, 20–17
| Pts: June Silorio 27; Rebs: George Diamante 17; Asts: Jonathan Manalili 6 | | Pts: Luis Pablo 22; Rebs: Luis Pablo 19; Asts: James Ison 6 |

San Andres Sports Complex, Manila
Referees: Glenn Cornelio (IR), Joenard Garcia (IR), Ralph Moreto (NR)

GTV

March 16
2:30 p.m.

Box score

| Letran Squires | 77–61 | La Salle Green Hills Greenies |
Scoring by quarter: 21–18, 17–10, 18–16, 21–17
| Pts: Jovel Baliling 19; Rebs: George Diamante 13; Asts: Jonathan Manalili 7 | | Pts: Luis Pablo 20; Rebs: Seven Gagate 18; Asts: Rod Alian 4 |
Letran wins series, 2–0

San Andres Sports Complex, Manila
Referees: Glenn Cornelio (IR), Harry Santos (IR), Carlo Sebastian (NR)

- Finals Most Valuable Player: Andy Gemao (Letran Squires)
- Coach of the Year: Allen Ricardo (Letran Squires)

=== Awards ===
NCAA Season 98 juniors' basketball champions
Letran Squires
13th title

The awards were handed out prior to Game 2 of the Finals at the San Andres Sports Complex.

- Most Valuable Player: Luis Pablo (La Salle Green Hills Greenies)
- Rookie of the Year: Matthew Rubico (Lyceum Junior Pirates)
- Mythical Five:
  - Luis Pablo (La Salle Green Hills Greenies)
  - Seven Gagate (La Salle Green Hills Greenies)
  - Chris Hubilla (San Beda Red Cubs)
  - Matthew Rubico (Lyceum Junior Pirates)
  - Amiel Acido (Perpetual Junior Altas)
  - Andy Gemao (Letran Squires)
- Defensive Player of the Year (co-winners): George Diamante (Letran Squires) and Paul Enal (JRU Light Bombers)
- All-Defensive Team:
  - Ivan Panapanaan (Arellano Braves)
  - Luis Pablo (La Salle Green Hills Greenies)
  - Seven Gagate (La Salle Green Hills Greenies)
  - Amiel Acido (Perpetual Junior Altas)
  - George Diamante (Letran Squires)
  - Paul Enal (JRU Light Bombers)
- Most Improved Player: Seven Gagate (La Salle Green Hills Greenies)
- Sportsmanship Award: San Beda Red Cubs

=== Statistical leaders ===
Statistical leaders' averages after the elimination round.

==== Season player highs ====
| Statistic | Player | Team | Average |
|---|---|---|---|
| Points per game | Matthew Rubico | Lyceum Junior Pirates | 21.89 |
| Rebounds per game | George Diamante | Letran Squires | 13.78 |
| Assists per game | Matthew Rubico | Lyceum Junior Pirates | 7.11 |
| Steals per game | Cristian Vergara | Perpetual Junior Altas | 2.17 |
| Blocks per game | Ivan Panapanaan | Arellano Braves | 2.22 |
| Field goal percentage | Lebron Daep | Perpetual Junior Altas | 73.91% |
| Three-point field goal percentage | Nat Fuentes | Lyceum Junior Pirates | 37.14% |
| Free throw percentage | Cirian Mulligan | Lyceum Junior Pirates | 82.76% |
| Turnovers per game | Matthew Rubico | Lyceum Junior Pirates | 5.33 |

==== Team game highs ====
| Statistic | Team | Total | Opponent |
|---|---|---|---|
| Points | Letran Squires | 116 | EAC–ICA Brigadiers |
| Rebounds | Arellano Braves | 69 | Letran Squires |
| Assists | La Salle Green Hills Greenies | 29 | EAC–ICA Brigadiers |
| Steals | San Sebastian Staglets | 16 | EAC–ICA Brigadiers |
| Blocks | San Sebastian Staglets | 10 | Perpetual Junior Altas |
| Blocks | Lyceum Junior Pirates | 10 | San Beda Red Cubs |
| Field goal percentage | Lyceum Junior Pirates | 52.0% | Perpetual Junior Altas |
| Three-point field goal percentage | JRU Light Bombers | 47.0% | Mapúa Red Robins |
| Free throw percentage | Mapúa Red Robins | 83.0% | San Beda Red Cubs |
| Turnovers | Arellano Braves | 37 | Letran Squires |

==== Team season highs ====
| Statistic | Team | Average |
|---|---|---|
| Points per game | Letran Squires | 89.56 |
| Rebounds per game | La Salle Green Hills Greenies | 53.67 |
| Assists per game | La Salle Green Hills Greenies | 20.33 |
| Steals per game | Letran Squires | 10.0 |
| Blocks per game | Arellano Braves; Letran Squires | 4.67 |
| Field goal percentage | Lyceum Junior Pirates | 42.81% |
| Three-point field goal percentage | Lyceum Junior Pirates | 29.31% |
| Free throw percentage | Lyceum Junior Pirates | 61.08% |
| Turnovers per game | San Beda Red Cubs | 16.44 |

== See also ==
- UAAP Season 85 basketball tournaments

| Preceded by Season 97 (2021) | NCAA men's basketball seasons Season 98 (2022) | Succeeded by Season 99 (2023) |
| Preceded by Season 95 (2019) | NCAA juniors' basketball seasons Season 98 (2023) | Succeeded by Season 99 (2024) |
