= Bonnie Tan =

Filipino basketball coach and executive

Titan Ultra Giant Risers
- Position: Consultant
- League: PBA

Personal information
- Born: September 9, 1972 (age 54)

Career information
- High school: Grace Christian High School (Quezon City)
- College: UST
- Coaching career: 2003–present

Career history

Coaching
- 2003–2014: Lyceum
- 2013–2014: GlobalPort Batang Pier (assistant)
- 2019–2022: Letran
- 2021, 2023: NorthPort Batang Pier (interim)
- 2023–2025: NorthPort Batang Pier
- 2025–present: Titan Ultra Giant Risers (consultant)

Career highlights
- As head coach: 2× ISAA seniors' champion (2009, 2010); 3× NCAA seniors' champion (2019, 2021, 2022)

Bonnie Tan (born September 9, 1972) is a Filipino basketball coach who is currently the consultant for the Titan Ultra Giant Risers of the Philippine Basketball Association (PBA). He is the former head coach of the NorthPort Batang Pier. He is also a Freemason of the Grand Lodge of the Philippines. He last coached Colegio de San Juan de Letran's men's basketball team of the National Collegiate Athletic Association (Philippines) (NCAA)

== Career ==
=== Playing career ===
In 1988, Tan played under Alfrancis Chua's Grace Christian High School (now Grace Christian College). Tan then played for the UST Growling Tigers under Aric del Rosario from 1991 to 1992.

=== Coaching career ===
==== Beginnings ====
In 1991, Tan served as Goldwin Monteverde's assistant in Saint Stephen's High School's developmental team, while studying in UST. After two years, Tan left Saint Stephen's to return to his alma mater Grace Christian High School to serve as its elementary school coach.

==== Lyceum Pirates ====
He then served as Lyceum Pirates' head coach for more than a decade. Tan coached Lyceum to two unbeaten seasons in the Inter-Scholastic Athletic Association, and qualified to four straight Philippine Collegiate Champions League tournaments. Tan guided the Pirates in the transition from when they became a guest team in the NCAA in 2011. The Pirates, with the exception of 2012 when they finished last, were a mid-table team during Tan's tenure. He resigned in 2014 after the Pirates finished NCAA Season 90 just outside playoff contention.

He was reportedly considered to be the head coach of the UST Growling Tigers midway the 2017 season, but declined out of respect to then current coaching staff; Tan himself denied being approached by UST.

==== Letran Knights ====
Tan was then appointed head coach of the Letran Knights in 2019. In his first game, Tan coached Letran to a loss against his former team Lyceum. Tan ultimately led the Knights to its first title in four seasons by winning the NCAA Season 95 championship.

At the height of COVID-19 pandemic, Alfrancis Chua, Letran's special assistant to the rector for sports development, denied Tan will be replaced by just resigned UST Growling Tigers coach Aldin Ayo. Ayo previously led Letran to a title in 2015, and just led the Tigers to a runner-up finish in the previous UAAP season. Days later, Tan announced the transfer of three UST players to Letran.

In the 2021 PBA All-Filipino Cup, Tan coached the NorthPort Batang Pier of the Philippine Basketball Association for three games when its entire coaching staff were not cleared from health and safety protocols due to the COVID-19 pandemic. Tan coached the team to three victories before being replaced by head coach Pido Jarencio.

With the 2020 NCAA season canceled, and the 2021 season delayed to early 2022, Tan coached Letran to a second consecutive title. The Knights had a perfect season, winning all nine elimination round games, and all three playoff games. Rhenz Abando, one of the transferees from UST, was named the NCAA's Rookie of the Year and Most Valuable Player. In the 2022 season done just months later, Letran successfully defended the title, winning its third consecutive title.

Weeks after winning his third NCAA title, Tan was named interim head coach of NorthPort Batang Pier, replacing Jarencio, who then replaced Tan as NorthPort's team manager.

==== NorthPort Batang Pier ====
On April 23, 2023, Tan was officially promoted as the full-time head coach of the NorthPort Batang Pier.

=== Managerial career ===
Tan is the team manager of NorthPort Batang Pier in the PBA. In 2022, during the contract renewal talks concerning Robert Bolick, he convinced Bolick to stay with NorthPort despite offers from teams from other countries. Meanwhile, for Greg Slaughter's contract, Slaughter denied Tan's claims that he is demanding a contract that's more than the league maximum.

Tan is also the tournament director of the Metro Basketball Tournament since 2017, which has since been remained as the "M-League," supported by the PBA and the Metropolitan Manila Development Authority.

== Coaching record ==
=== College ===
Season	Team	Elimination round					Playoffs				
Season	Team	GP	W	L	PCT	Finish	GP	W	L	PCT	Results
2011	LPU	18	7	11	.389	6th	—	—	—	—	Eliminated
2012	LPU	18	3	15	.167	10th	—	—	—	—	Eliminated
2013	LPU	18	8	10	.444	7th	—	—	—	—	Eliminated
2014	LPU	18	7	11	.389	7th	—	—	—	—	Eliminated
2019	CSJL	18	12	6	.667	3rd	5	4	1	.500	Champions
2020	CSJL	Canceled due to the COVID-19 pandemic									
2021	CSJL	9	9	0	1.000	1st	3	3	0	1.000	Champions
2022	CSJL	18	13	5	.722	2nd	4	3	1	.750	Champions
Totals			117	59	58	.504	12	10	2	.833	3 championships

=== PBA ===
Season	Conference	Team	Elimination round					Playoffs				
Season	Conference	Team	Finish	GP	W	L	PCT	GP	W	L	PCT	Results
2021	Philippine Cup	NorthPort	—	3	3	0	1.000	—	—	—	—	interim
2022–23	Governors' Cup	NorthPort	9th/12	11	3	8	.273	—	—	—	—	Eliminated
2023–24	Commissioner's Cup	NorthPort	6th/12	11	6	5	.545	1	0	1	.000	Quarterfinals
2023–24	Philippine Cup	NorthPort	9th/12	11	5	6	.455	1	0	1	.000	8th-seed playoff
2024–25	Governors' Cup	NorthPort	5th/6	10	3	7	.300	—	—	—	—	Eliminated
2024–25	Commissioner's Cup	NorthPort	1st/13	12	9	3	.750	6	2	4	.333	Semifinals
2024–25	Philippine Cup	NorthPort	11th/12	11	2	9	.182	—	—	—	—	Eliminated
Career total				69	31	38	.449	8	2	6	.250	0 championships

Preceded by N/A	Lyceum Pirates men's basketball head coach 2003–2014	Succeeded by Topex Robinson
Preceded by Jeff Napa	Letran Knights men's basketball head coach 2019–2022	Succeeded by Rensy Bajar
