= 2019 Letran Knights basketball team =

2019 Letran Knights men's basketball

NCAA Season 95 champions

Record
- Elims rank: #3
- Final rank: #1
- 2019 record: 16–7 (12–6 elims)
- Head coach: Bonnie Tan (1st season)
- Assistant coaches: Raymund Tiongco; Eiven Lou Gatumbato; Gil Lumberio; Robert Joseph Guevarra; LA Tenorio; Rensy Bajar
- Captain: Jerrick Balanza (5th season)

The 2019 Letran Knights men's basketball team represented Colegio de San Juan de Letran in the 95th season of the National Collegiate Athletic Association in the Philippines. The men's basketball tournament for the school year 2019-20 began on July 7, 2019, and the host school for the season was Arellano University.

The Knights finished the double round-robin eliminations at third place with 12 wins against 6 losses. They then eliminated San Sebastian Stags in the first round of the stepladder semifinals and went on to defeat the second seeded Lyceum Pirates in the next round to advance to the finals against the undefeated San Beda Red Lions.

The Knights went on to defeat the Red Lions in three games to capture their 18th NCAA championship, their first since winning the title last 2015 when they also toppled San Beda in the finals. Point guard Fran Yu was named Finals Most Valuable Player and Most Improved Player of the season.

== Roster ==
Letran Knights roster
Players
Coaches

Pos.	No.	Nat.	Name	Height	Year	High School
C	1	(Philippines)	Muyang, Larry L.	6'5" (1.96m)	2nd	San Isidro High School
PG	3	(Philippines)	Yu, Fran Louie Y.	5'10" (1.78m)	2nd	Chiang Kai-shek College
PF	4	(Philippines)	Ular, Renato T.	6'4" (1.93m)	2nd	Padapada National High School
PF	5	(Philippines)	Sangalang, Mark Louie	6'3" (1.91m)	2nd	Academy of Queen Mary School Inc.
PG	6	(Philippines)	Olivario, Tommy York G.	5'9" (1.75m)	3rd	Colegio de San Juan de Letran
SG	7	(Philippines)	Balanza, Jerrick G. (C)	6'2" (1.88m)	5th	Colegio de San Juan de Letran
PG	8	(Philippines)	Reyson, Kurt Spencer E.	5'10" (1.78m)	1st	Colegio de San Juan de Letran
PF	9	(Philippines)	Javillonar, Marc Paolo J.	6'6" (1.98m)	1st	Nazareth School of National University
C	15	(Philippines)	Balagasay, Christian L.	6'6" (1.98m)	5th	Northridge Montessori School
PF	18	(Philippines)	Ambohot, Jeo R.	6'7" (2.01m)	4th	Agro-Industrial Foundation College of the Philippines
SG	20	(Philippines)	Pambid, Gay Lord Jap M.	6'2" (1.88m)	3rd	–
SG	22	(Philippines)	Mina, Allen Andrew R.	6'1" (1.85m)	1st	Nazareth School of National University
SG	23	(Philippines)	Batiller, Edson A.	6'0" (1.83m)	2nd	–
SF	27	(Philippines)	Caralipio, King Deniell M.	6'2" (1.88m)	3rd	San Pedro High School
PF	35	(Philippines)	Guarino, Neil Andrey A.	6'6" (1.98m)	1st	Colegio de San Juan de Letran
PG	Reserved	(Philippines)	Alferez, Richie P.	5'10" (1.78m)	–	–
PF	Reserved	(Philippines)	Bañez, Shamasneh B.	6'3" (1.91m)	–	Chiang Kai-shek College
C	Reserved	(Philippines)	Vacaro, Lance Juviel M.	6'5" (1.96m)	–	St. Benedict College of Cotabato

Head coach

- Bonnie Tan

Assistant coach(es)

- Raymund Tiongco
- Eiven Lou Gatumbato
- Gil Lumberio
- Robert Joseph Guevarra
- LA Tenorio
- Rensy Bajar
- Jeff Napa (consultant)

Team manager

- Waiyip Chong
- Eric Ang

Legend

- (C) Team captain
- Injured

=== Depth chart ===
Pos.	Starting 5	Bench 1	Bench 2
C	Balagasay	Muyang	Javillonar
PF	Ular	Ambohot	Guarino
SF	Mina	Caralipio	Sangalang
SG	Batiller	Balanza	Pambid
PG	Reyson	Yu	Olivario

== Coaching staff ==
Head coach Jeff Napa formally part ways with Letran at the end of his three-year contract, who was then hired in the Philippine Basketball Association by NorthPort Batang Pier as an assistant coach. On February 28, 2019, Letran officials formally named NorthPort Batang Pier team manager and former longtime Lyceum Pirates head coach Bonnie Tan as the Knights' new mentor.

Joining Tan in the coaching staff are Raymund Tiongco, Eiven Gatumbato, Gil Lumberio, Letran Squires head coach RJ Guevarra, Diliman College Blue Dragons head coach Rensy Bajar, and PBA star LA Tenorio.

== Pre-season results ==
2019 Filoil Flying V Preseason Premier Cup

Date	Time	Opponent	Venue	Result	Record
Eliminations
May 7	3:15 p.m.	JRU Heavy Bombers	Filoil Flying V Centre • San Juan	W 78–67	1–0
Game Highs: Points: Balanza – 25; Rebounds: Ular – 14; Assists: Balanza – 5
May 10	4:00 p.m.	FEU Tamaraws	Filoil Flying V Centre • San Juan	W 75–70	2–0
May 12	2:00 p.m.	NU Bulldogs	Filoil Flying V Centre • San Juan	W 76–69	3–0
May 17	2:00 p.m.	Lyceum Pirates	Filoil Flying V Centre • San Juan	L 95–101	3–1
Game Highs: Points: Mina – 30; Rebounds: Sangalang – 6; Assists: Olivario – 4
May 20	4:00 p.m.	EAC Generals	Filoil Flying V Centre • San Juan	W 79–77	4–1
Game Highs: Points: Mina – 17; Rebounds: Muyang – 11; Assists: Caralipio, Olivario – 3
May 25	2:00 p.m.	Adamson Soaring Falcons	Filoil Flying V Centre • San Juan	L 85–89	4–2
June 10	4:00 p.m.	Benilde Blazers	Filoil Flying V Centre • San Juan	W 74–62	5–2
Game Highs: Points: Ular – 18; Rebounds: Ular – 15; Assists: Olivario, Yu – 4
Advances to Quarterfinals
Quarterfinals
June 17	4:00 p.m.	De La Salle Green Archers	Filoil Flying V Centre • San Juan	L 69–80	0–1

Times listed above are in UTC+08:00

2019 PBA D-League Aspirants Cup

Date	Time	Opponent	Venue	Result	Record
Eliminations
Feb 28		Che'lu Bar and Grill	Ynares Sports Arena • Pasig	L 94–96	0–1
Mar 5		AMA University Titans	Paco Arena • Manila	W 108–91	1–1
Mar 9		Batangas-EAC Generals	Ynares Sports Arena • Pasig	W 115–73	2–1
Mar 18		McDavid Apparels	Paco Arena • Manila	W 89–64	3–1
Mar 26		Family Mart-Enderun Colleges	JCSGO Gym • Quezon City	W 77–70	4–1
Apr 3		Cignal-Ateneo Hawkeyes	Ynares Sports Arena • Pasig	L 69–83	4–2
Apr 11		Ironcon-UST Growling Tigers	Ynares Sports Arena • Pasig	W 114–101	5–2
Apr 23		Virtual Reality-St. Clare College	JCSGO Gym • Quezon City	W 91–90	6–2
May 2		Go For Gold-CSB Scratchers	Ynares Sports Arena • Pasig	L 87–107	6–3

Times listed above are in UTC+08:00

== NCAA Season 95 games results ==
Elimination games were played in a double round-robin format. All games were aired on ABS-CBN Sports and Action, Liga, & iWantTFC.

Date	Time	Opponent	Venue	Result	Record
First round of eliminations
Jul 7	2:00 p.m.	Lyceum Pirates	Mall of Asia Arena • Pasay City	L 80–84	0–1
Game Highs: Points: Balanza – 19; Rebounds: Ambohot – 10; Assists: Olivario – 7
Jul 12	2:00 p.m.	Arellano Chiefs	Filoil Flying V Centre • San Juan	W 81–72	1–1
Game Highs: Points: Balanza – 31; Rebounds: Ambohot – 11; Assists: Yu, Olivario – 5
Jul 16	12:00 p.m.	JRU Heavy Bombers	Filoil Flying V Centre • San Juan	W 55–43	2–1
Game Highs: Points: Batiller – 14; Rebounds: Muyang, Yu – 7; Assists: Batiller – 4
Jul 19	12:00 p.m.	Perpetual Altas	Filoil Flying V Centre • San Juan	W 82–80^{OT}	3–1
Game Highs: Points: Batiller – 22; Rebounds: Ambohot, Ular – 13; Assists: Balanza, Yu – 5
Jul 23	4:00 p.m.	EAC Generals	Filoil Flying V Centre • San Juan	W 91–89	4–1
Game Highs: Points: Balanza – 22; Rebounds: Muyang – 10; Assists: Yu – 5
Jul 30	12:00 p.m.	Mapúa Cardinals	Filoil Flying V Centre • San Juan	W 89–84	5–1
Game Highs: Points: Muyang – 24; Rebounds: Muyang – 9; Assists: Yu – 7
Aug 10	2:00 p.m.	San Beda Red Lions	Cuneta Astrodome • Pasay City	L 66–70	5–2
Game Highs: Points: Balanza – 20; Rebounds: Ambohot – 9; Assists: Balanza – 5
Aug 20	12:00 p.m.	San Sebastian Stags	Filoil Flying V Centre • San Juan	L 101–102^{OT}	5–3
Game Highs: Points: Muyang – 32; Rebounds: Muyang – 18; Assists: Yu, Olivario – 4
Sep 6	12:00 p.m.	Benilde Blazers	Cuneta Astrodome • Pasay City	W 88–64	6–3
Game Highs: Points: Balanza – 26; Rebounds: Ambohot – 9; Assists: Yu – 7
Tied at second place after 1st round (6 wins–3 losses)
Second round of eliminations
Sep 10	4:00 p.m.	JRU Heavy Bombers	Filoil Flying V Centre • San Juan	W 81–61	7–3
Game Highs: Points: Ular – 17; Rebounds: Ular – 7; Assists: Yu – 5
Sep 13	2:00 p.m.	Mapúa Cardinals	Filoil Flying V Centre • San Juan	L 101–105^{OT}	7–4
Game Highs: Points: Yu – 23; Rebounds: Ular – 23; Assists: Balanza, Yu – 7
Sep 20	4:00 p.m.	San Sebastian Stags	Filoil Flying V Centre • San Juan	W 99–82	8–4
Game Highs: Points: Muyang, Batiller – 15; Rebounds: Ular – 11; Assists: Yu – 6
Sep 24	2:00 p.m.	Benilde Blazers	Filoil Flying V Centre • San Juan	W 87–74	9–4
Game Highs: Points: Ular – 20; Rebounds: Batiller, Caralipio, Ular – 8; Assists: Yu – 8
Sep 27	4:00 p.m.	Lyceum Pirates	Filoil Flying V Centre • San Juan	L 90–97	9–5
Game Highs: Points: Reyson – 20; Rebounds: Batiller, Ular – 6; Assists: Balanza, Olivario – 8
Oct 1	2:00 p.m.	San Beda Red Lions	Filoil Flying V Centre • San Juan	L 63–75	9–6
Game Highs: Points: Muyang – 13; Rebounds: Ambohot – 8; Assists: Muyang – 3
Oct 3	2:00 p.m.	Arellano Chiefs	Filoil Flying V Centre • San Juan	W 97–84	10–6
Game Highs: Points: Batiller – 18; Rebounds: Ambohot, Caralipio – 8; Assists: Yu – 6
Oct 11	12:00 p.m.	Perpetual Altas	Filoil Flying V Centre • San Juan	W 88–69	11–6
Game Highs: Points: Balagasay, Balanza – 18; Rebounds: Ular – 16; Assists: Ambohot, Yu – 4
Oct 17	2:00 p.m.	EAC Generals	Filoil Flying V Centre • San Juan	W 87–79	12–6
Game Highs: Points: Muyang – 22; Rebounds: Muyang – 11; Assists: Batiller, Yu – 4
Third place at 12 wins–6 losses (6 wins–3 losses in the 2nd round)
First round of stepladder semifinals
Nov 5	4:00 p.m.	San Sebastian Stags	Cuneta Astrodome • Pasay City	W 85–80	1–0 (13–6)
Game Highs: Points: Balanza – 15; Rebounds: Yu – 7; Assists: Balanza, Batiller, Ular – 4
Advanced to second round of stepladder semifinals
Second round of stepladder semifinals
Nov 8	4:00 p.m.	Lyceum Pirates	Cuneta Astrodome • Pasay City	W 92–88	1–0 (14–6)
Game Highs: Points: Yu – 20; Rebounds: Muyang – 9; Assists: Batiller, Yu – 6
Advanced to Finals
Finals
Nov 12	4:00 p.m.	San Beda Red Lions	Mall of Asia Arena • Pasay City	W 65–64	1–0 (15–6)
Game Highs: Points: Batiller – 12; Rebounds: Muyang – 8; Assists: Yu – 6
Nov 15	4:00 p.m.	San Beda Red Lions	Mall of Asia Arena • Pasay City	L 76–79	1–1 (15–7)
Game Highs: Points: Yu – 23; Rebounds: Caralipio, Muyang – 10; Assists: Yu – 5
Nov 19	4:00 p.m.	San Beda Red Lions	Mall of Asia Arena • Pasay City	W 81–79	2–1 (16–7)
Game Highs: Points: Balanza – 27; Rebounds: Ular – 9; Assists: Yu – 7
Knights clinched 18th NCAA championship

Times listed above are in UTC+08:00

Source: Pong Ducanes, Imperium Technology

== Awards ==
Player	Award
Bonbon Batiller	Player of the Week — July 14–20
Jerrick Balanza	Player of the Week — September 1–7
Fran Yu	NCAA Finals Most Valuable Player
Fran Yu	NCAA Most Improved Player
