= Randy Alcantara =

Filipino basketball coach

Personal information
- Born: January 15, 1972 (age 54)
- Listed height: 6 ft 3 in (1.91 m)

Career information
- College: Mapúa
- PBA draft: 1998: 3rd round, 17th overall pick
- Drafted by: Formula Shell Zoom Masters
- Coaching career: 2010–present

Career history

Playing
- 1995–1998: Stag Pale Pilseners
- 1998–1999: Laguna Lakers
- 1999–2001: San Juan Knights
- 2002: Pangasinan Waves

Coaching
- 2009–2019: Malayan HSS
- 2009–2015: Mapúa (assistant)
- 2011–2012: Tanduay Light Rhum Masters (assistant)
- 2018–2019: UST (assistant)
- 2018–2024: San Juan Knights
- 2019–2025: Mapúa

Career highlights
- As player: NCAA men's champion (1991); 6× PBL champions (1995 Reinforced, 1995 All-Filipino Cup, 1995-96 Danny Floro Cup, 1996 Danny Floro Cup, 1997 Makati Mayor's, 1997-98 All-Filipino); 1998 Battle of the MBA Star. Northern Conference reserve; 2000 MBA FedEx Croosover cup Champions; 2000 MBA Northern Conference Champions; 2000 MBA National Champions; 2001 MBA First Phase Champions; As head coach: MPBL champion (2019); MPBL Coach of the Year (2018–19); NCAA men's champion (2024); 2× NCAA juniors' champion (2016, 2019)

Randy Alcantara (January 15, 1972) is a former collegiate basketball player who served as the head coach of Mapua Cardinals.

== Career ==
=== Playing career ===
Alcantara played under Joel Banal in 1991 NCAA finals.

He played under Alfrancis Chua for Stag Pale Pilseners, and with MVP Marlou Aquino, Bal David, Reuben Dela Rosa, Derrick Bughao, Paul Du and best import Antoine Joubert, they completed a three-conference sweep and a grandslam in their very first season in the PBL, becoming the sole PBL Team to do so. They also became the third team to win a title in their first try during the Reinforced Conference, defeating Red Bull Energy Drink in four games. Stag had an easier time scoring a three-game finals sweep in the next two conferences, winning over Casino Rubbing Alcohol in the All-Filipino Cup and repeating over Red Bull in the Danny Floro Cup in January 1996. He was also a Mythical Second Team member.

In 1998 PBL Makati Mayors Cup finals, he scored 13 points for Tanduay to help the squad to win over Dazz. In the same year's All-Filipino finals, he helped Tanduay to came back from a 1–2 series deficit and win their 6th PBL title against Agfa HDC Films. In the deciding fifth game, Agfa was ahead, 60–53, with 8:42 left in the final quarter, but he and Eric Menk scored successively to levelled the count at 66-all with 4:11 left. They eventually won championship.

=== Coaching career ===
Alcantara coached the San Juan Knights, and led them to their first title in the 2019 MPBL finals.

On December 6, 2018, Alcantara was hired as the new head coach of Mapua Cardinals. He led the team to a finals appearance against since 1990, and defeated San Beda. He resigned by 2026.

== Coaching record ==
=== High school ===
Season	Team	Elimination round					Playoffs				
Season	Team	Finish	GP	W	L	PCT	GP	W	L	PCT	Results
2009	MHSS	7th/10	18	5	13	.278	—	—	—	—	Eliminated
2010	MHSS	7th/9	16	6	10	.375	—	—	—	—	Eliminated
2011	MHSS	5th/10	18	10	8	.556	—	—	—	—	Eliminated
2012	MHSS	5th/10	18	11	7	.611	—	—	—	—	Eliminated
2013	MHSS	4th/10	18	12	6	.667	1	0	1	.000	Stepladder round 1
2014	MHSS	1st/10	18	15	3	.833	5	3	2	.600	Finals
2015	MHSS	2nd/10	18	16	2	.889	1	0	1	.000	Stepladder round 2
2016	MHSS	2nd/10	18	15	3	.833	4	3	1	.750	Champion
2017	MHSS	2nd/10	18	13	5	.722	4	2	2	.500	Finals
2018	MHSS	2nd/10	18	14	4	.778	5	3	2	.600	Champion
Totals			178	117	61	.657	20	11	9	.550	2 championships

=== Collegiate ===
Season	Team	Elimination round					Playoffs				
Season	Team	Finish	GP	W	L	PCT	GP	W	L	PCT	Results
2019	MU	6th	18	9	9	.500	—	—	—	—	Did not qualify
2021–22	MU	2nd	9	7	2	.778	4	1	3	.250	Finals
2022	MU	7th	18	7	11	.389	—	—	—	—	Did not qualify
2023	MU	1st	18	15	3	.833	4	2	2	.500	Finals
2024	MU	1st	18	15	3	.833	3	3	0	1.000	Champions
2025	MU	3rd	13	7	6	.538	2	1	1	.500	Quarterfinals
Totals			94	60	34	.638	13	7	6	.538	1 championship

=== Professional ===
Season	League	Team	Regular season/elimination round					Playoffs				
Season	League	Team	Finish	GP	W	L	PCT	GP	W	L	PCT	Results
2018–19	MPBL	SJ	3rd North	25	20	5	.800	12	9	3	.750	Champion
2019–20	MPBL	SJ	1st North	30	26	4	.867	11	7	4	.636	National finals
2022	MPBL	SJ	3rd North	21	14	7	.667	7	5	2	.714	Division finals
2022–23	PSL	SJ	1st	15	15	0	1.000	3	1	2	.333	Semifinals
2023	MPBL	SJ	6th North	28	19	9	.679	6	4	2	.667	Division finals
2023–24	PSL	SJ	2nd	18	16	2	.889	5	3	2	.600	Third place
2024	MPBL	SJ	1st North	28	26	2	.929	6	4	2	.667	Division finals
Totals				165	136	29	.824	50	33	17	.660	1 championship
