= NCAA Season 95 basketball tournaments =

Basketball season

NCAA Season 95
- "Kaisa sa Pagkakaiba" (transl. United in diversity)
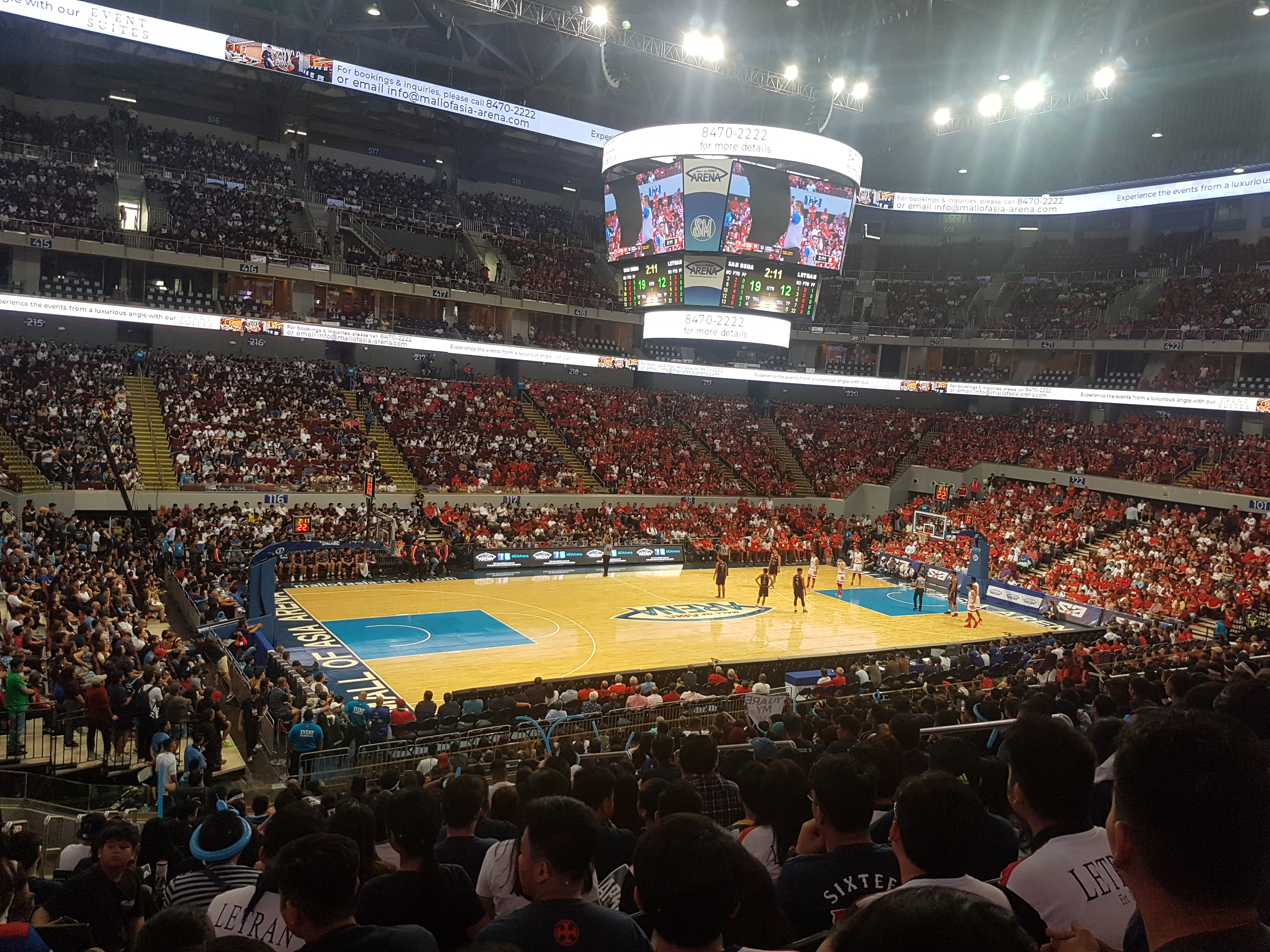
- Game 3 of the men's finals between Letran and San Beda
- Host school: Arellano University
Men's Finals	G1	G2	G3	Wins
San Beda Red Lions	64	79	79	1
Letran Knights	65	76	81	2
- Duration: November 12–19, 2019
- Arena: Mall of Asia Arena
- Finals MVP: Fran Yu
- Winning coach: Bonnie Tan (1st title)
- Semifinalists: Lyceum Pirates; San Sebastian Stags
- TV networks: ABS-CBN Sports and Action; Liga iWant
Juniors' Finals	G1	G2	G3	Wins
San Beda Red Cubs	94	76	98	2
Lyceum Junior Pirates	80	78	77	1
- Duration: November 12–19, 2019
- Arena: Mall of Asia Arena
- Finals MVP: Rhayyan Amsali
- Winning coach: Manu Iñigo (1st title)
- Semifinalists: San Sebastian Staglets; La Salle Green Hills Greenies

The NCAA Season 95 basketball tournaments are the 95th basketball season of the National Collegiate Athletic Association (Philippines) (NCAA). Arellano University are the season hosts. Separate men's and juniors' tournaments are held for male college and senior high school students, respectively.

Bamboo Mañalac and performers from Arellano University performed in the opening ceremony held at the Mall of Asia Arena on July 7, 2019.

The Letran Knights won the men's championship after beating three-time defending champions and erstwhile unbeaten San Beda Red Lions in the Finals. Finishing the elimination round undefeated, the Red Lions advanced to the Finals outright. Letran defeated San Sebastian in the first round of the stepladder semifinals to meet previous year's finalist Lyceum in the second round. The Knights defeated the Pirates to arrange a Finals meeting with the Red Lions. The Finals went the distance, with all three games being decided in the final play of the game. Letran won the title to bring the 18th championship back to Intramuros.

The San Beda Red Cubs won the juniors' title after beating the Lyceum Junior Pirates in the Finals. Both Red Cubs and Junior Pirates finished in the top two seeds after the elimination round. San Beda eliminated the LSGH Greenies, which qualified by defeating the Arellano Braves in a playoff, in the first game to advance to the Finals. Lyceum needed their twice-to-beat advantage to eliminate the San Sebastian Staglets. The Red Cubs handily defeated the Junior Pirates in Game 1, but Lyceum eked out a Game 2 win to force a third game, where San Beda won comprehensively.

== Format ==
The association is using this format for 2019:

- In the seniors and juniors' tournament, ten (10) teams will play in a double round-robin classification. The top four (4) team advance to the playoffs.
- Once teams are tied, tie-breaker games shall be held for the top four seeds, if necessary.
- The scenarios after the elimination round ends are the following:
  1. If no team doesn't win all elimination round games, the regular playoffs (Final Four) shall be used.
  2. If a team wins all elimination round games, that team will gain an automatic bye to the finals and the stepladder playoffs shall be used.
- In the semifinals, the first and second seed shall earn a twice-to-beat bonus against their respective opponents. These teams shall only need to win once to advance to the finals; while the third and fourth seed teams will need to win twice to advance to the finals.
  - In the stepladder semifinals, the third and fourth seed will play to determine which among them will face the second seed, The winner of the game against the second seed will meet the first seed in the finals.
- The finals is a best-of-three championship series.

Tie-breaker classification rules
1. Head-to-head matchup in the two (2) rounds
2. Goal average between the tied teams
3. Overall goal average

== Teams ==
All ten schools are participating.

Men's teams
Team	College	Coach
Arellano Chiefs	Arellano University (AU)	(Philippines) Cholo Martin
Letran Knights	Colegio de San Juan de Letran (CSJL)	(Philippines) Bonnie Tan
Benilde Blazers	De La Salle–College of Saint Benilde (CSB)	(Philippines) Ty Tang
EAC Generals	Emilio Aguinaldo College (EAC)	(Philippines) Oliver Bunyi
JRU Heavy Bombers	José Rizal University (JRU)	(Philippines) Louie Gonzalez
Lyceum Pirates	Lyceum of the Philippines University (LPU)	(Philippines) Topex Robinson
Mapúa Cardinals	Mapúa University (MU)	(Philippines) Randy Alcantara
San Beda Red Lions	San Beda University (SBU)	(Philippines) Boyet Fernandez
San Sebastian Stags	San Sebastian College – Recoletos (SSC-R)	(Philippines) Edgar Macaraya
Perpetual Altas	University of Perpetual Help System DALTA (UPHSD)	(Philippines) Frankie Lim

Juniors' teams
Team	High school	Coach
Arellano Braves	Arellano University (AU)	(Philippines) Junjie Ablan
Letran Squires	Colegio de San Juan de Letran (CSJL)	(Philippines) Raymund Valenzona
EAC-IAC Brigadiers	Immaculate Concepcion Academy (IAC)	(Philippines) Azlie Guro
JRU Light Bombers	José Rizal University (JRU)	(Philippines) Vic Lazaro
La Salle Green Hills Greenies	La Salle Green Hills (LSGH)	(Philippines) Karl Santos
Lyceum Junior Pirates	Lyceum of the Philippines University – Cavite (LPU-C)	(Philippines) JC Docto
Mapúa Red Robins	Malayan High School of Science (MHSS)	(Philippines) Yong Garcia
San Beda Red Cubs	San Beda University Rizal (SBUR)	(Philippines) Manu Iñigo
San Sebastian Staglets	San Sebastian College – Recoletos (SSC-R)	(Philippines) Mel Banua
Perpetual Junior Altas	University of Perpetual Help System DALTA (UPHSD)	(Philippines) Myk Saguiguit

=== Coaching changes ===
Team	Outgoing coach	Manner of departure	Date	Replaced by	Date
Arellano Chiefs	(Philippines) Junjie Ablan	End of spell as interim coach	October 23, 2018	(Philippines) Cholo Martin	October 23, 2018
Arellano Braves	(Philippines) Tylon Darjuan	Fired	October 24, 2018	(Philippines) Junjie Ablan	October 24, 2018
Mapua Cardinals	(Philippines) Atoy Co	End of contract	October 31, 2018	(Philippines) Randy Alcantara	December 6, 2018
Malayan Red Robins	(Philippines) Randy Alcantara	Signed by Mapua Cardinals	December 6, 2018	(Philippines) Yong Garcia	December 6, 2018
EAC Generals	(Philippines) Ariel Sison	Demoted to lead assistant coach	December 7, 2018	(Philippines) Oliver Bunyi	December 7, 2018
Letran Knights	(Philippines) Jeff Napa	End of contract	January 11, 2019	(Philippines) Bonnie Tan	January 22, 2019
JRU Heavy Bombers	(Philippines) Vergel Meneses	End of contract	January 22, 2019	(Philippines) Louie Gonzalez	April 1, 2019
Lyceum Junior Pirates	(Philippines) LA Mumar	Mutual consent	December 17, 2018	(Philippines) JC Docto	February 9, 2019
La Salle Green Hills Greenies	(Philippines) Marvin Bienvenida	Mutual consent	March 28, 2019	(Philippines) Karl Santos	March 30, 2019

=== Uniform changes ===
The Letran Knights and Squires replaced their red uniforms with white ones, after request by the NCAA. Letran traditionally played with their red uniforms as their "light-colored" uniform.

== Venues ==
Venues in Metro Manila. Red pog, Primary venues; blue pogs: NCAA on Tour venues.

Like most Metro Manila-centric leagues, most games are held in arenas rented by the league, with games being played in neutral venues. In an innovation dubbed as "NCAA on Tour", starting in 2017, the NCAA will continue holding Thursday games in the first round hosted at the campus of one of the teams that are playing on that day.

=== Main venues ===
Arena	City
Mall of Asia Arena	Pasay
Filoil Flying V Centre	San Juan
Cuneta Astrodome	Pasay

=== NCAA on Tour venues ===
Arena	Host team	City
San Beda University Gym	San Beda Red Lions	Manila
Emilio Aguinaldo College Gym	EAC Generals	Manila
Mapua University Gym	Mapua Cardinals	Manila
University of Perpetual Help System DALTA Gym	Perpetual Altas	Las Piñas
Jose Rizal University Gym	JRU Heavy Bombers	Mandaluyong

== Squads ==
Each NCAA team can have up to 15 players on their roster. At least two is allowed to be a foreigner, but only one is allowed to be on court. A team is allowed to have three additional players in the reserve list. The opening day rosters were released on July 2.

This is the final season where non-Filipinos are allowed to play.

=== Imports ===
Only four foreigners from three teams participated in the final season imports can play.

Team	Import	Country
Benilde Blazers	Clement Leutcheu	Senegal
Lyceum Pirates	Mike Harry Nzeusseu	Cameroon
San Beda Red Lions	Donald Tankoua	Cameroon
San Beda Red Lions	Arnaud Noah	Cameroon

== Men's tournament ==
=== Elimination round ===
At the end of the elimination round, three-time defending champion San Beda finished first with an undefeated season, winning all 18 games. In their final elimination round game, they defeated Lyceum, the last team to win all 18 elimination round games, in 2017. This allowed the Red Lions to advance to the Finals outright, while modifying the usual Final Four format to a stepladder one. The Red Lions, who last finished the elimination round undefeated in 2010, advanced to their 14th consecutive Finals appearance. The Pirates finished second, awaiting the winning of the first round of stepladder semifinals.

The final participant of the Final Four was determined the following day. With Letran already guaranteed the third seed, only the fourth seed was up for grabs. The San Sebastian Stags defeated the Perpetual Altas to eliminate the Mapua Cardinals to qualify. With elimination confirmed, the Cardinals lost the next game against the Benilde Blazers. The last game of the eliminations had season host Arellano losing to JRU.

==== Team standings ====
Pos	Team	W	L	PCT	GB	Qualification
1	San Beda Red Lions	18	0	1.000	—	Advance to the Finals (Note: As San Beda won all elimination round games, the stepladder format will be used instead of the regular Final Four format.)
2	Lyceum Pirates	13	5	.722	5	Proceed to stepladder round 2
3	Letran Knights	12	6	.667	6	Proceed to stepladder round 1
4	San Sebastian Stags	11	7	.611	7	Proceed to stepladder round 1
5	Benilde Blazers	9	9	.500 (Note: Head-to-head point differential: Benilde +10, Mapua −10)	9	
6	Mapúa Cardinals	9	9	.500	9	
7	Perpetual Altas	5	13	.278 (Note: Head-to-head point differential: Perpetual +6, JRU −6)	13	
8	JRU Heavy Bombers	5	13	.278	13	
9	EAC Generals	4	14	.222 (Note: Head-to-head point differential: EAC +18, Arellano −18)	14	
10	Arellano Chiefs (H)	4	14	.222	14	

Source: ABS-CBN Sports
(H) Hosts

==== Match-up results ====
	Round 1									Round 2								
Team ╲ Game	1	2	3	4	5	6	7	8	9	10	11	12	13	14	15	16	17	18
Arellano	San Beda school colors	Letran school colors	JRU school colors	EAC school colors	UPHD school colors	Mapua school colors	CSB school colors	Lyceum school colors	SSC-R school colors	Lyceum school colors	San Beda school colors	UPHD school colors	Mapua school colors	CSB school colors	Letran school colors	EAC school colors	SSC-R school colors	JRU school colors
Letran	Lyceum school colors	Arellano school colors	JRU school colors	UPHD school colors	EAC school colors	Mapua school colors	San Beda school colors	SSC-R school colors	CSB school colors	JRU school colors	Mapua school colors	SSC-R school colors	CSB school colors	Lyceum school colors	San Beda school colors	Arellano school colors	UPHD school colors	EAC school colors
Benilde	EAC school colors	UPHD school colors	Mapua school colors	SSC-R school colors	Arellano school colors	Lyceum school colors	San Beda school colors	JRU school colors	Letran school colors	SSC-R school colors	Lyceum school colors	Letran school colors	Arellano school colors	UPHD school colors	EAC school colors	San Beda school colors	JRU school colors	Mapua school colors
EAC	CSB school colors	Lyceum school colors	San Beda school colors	Letran school colors	Arellano school colors	JRU school colors	Mapua school colors	UPHD school colors	SSC-R school colors	San Beda school colors	JRU school colors	Mapua school colors	SSC-R school colors	UPHD school colors	Lyceum school colors	CSB school colors	Arellano school colors	Letran school colors
JRU	SSC-R school colors	San Beda school colors	Letran school colors	Arellano school colors	UPHD school colors	Lyceum school colors	EAC school colors	Mapua school colors	CSB school colors	Letran school colors	EAC school colors	San Beda school colors	Mapua school colors	SSC-R school colors	UPHD school colors	Lyceum school colors	CSB school colors	Arellano school colors
Lyceum	Letran school colors	EAC school colors	Mapua school colors	SSC-R school colors	JRU school colors	UPHD school colors	CSB school colors	San Beda school colors	Arellano school colors	Arellano school colors	UPHD school colors	CSB school colors	Letran school colors	Mapua school colors	EAC school colors	SSC-R school colors	JRU school colors	San Beda school colors
Mapúa	UPHD school colors	SSC-R school colors	Lyceum school colors	CSB school colors	Letran school colors	Arellano school colors	EAC school colors	JRU school colors	San Beda school colors	Letran school colors	EAC school colors	Arellano school colors	JRU school colors	Lyceum school colors	San Beda school colors	SSC-R school colors	UPHD school colors	CSB school colors
San Beda	Arellano school colors	JRU school colors	EAC school colors	SSC-R school colors	Letran school colors	UPHD school colors	Lyceum school colors	CSB school colors	Mapua school colors	EAC school colors	Arellano school colors	JRU school colors	SSC-R school colors	UPHD school colors	Letran school colors	Mapua school colors	CSB school colors	Lyceum school colors
San Sebastian	JRU school colors	Mapua school colors	Lyceum school colors	San Beda school colors	CSB school colors	Letran school colors	UPHD school colors	EAC school colors	Arellano school colors	CSB school colors	Letran school colors	San Beda school colors	EAC school colors	JRU school colors	Lyceum school colors	Mapua school colors	Arellano school colors	UPHD school colors
Perpetual	Mapua school colors	CSB school colors	Letran school colors	JRU school colors	Arellano school colors	Lyceum school colors	San Beda school colors	EAC school colors	SSC-R school colors	Lyceum school colors	Arellano school colors	San Beda school colors	EAC school colors	CSB school colors	JRU school colors	Letran school colors	Mapua school colors	SSC-R school colors

= Win; = OT win; = Loss; = OT loss

==== Scores ====
Results on top and to the right of the dashes are for first-round games; those to the bottom and to the left of it are second-round games.

Teams	AU	CSJL	CSB	EAC	JRU	LPU	MU	SBU	SSC-R	UPHSD
Arellano Chiefs	—	72–81	77–82	86–77	77–80	87–81	64–73	46–59	79–85	73–75
Letran Knights	97–84	—	88–64	91–89	55–43	80–84	89–84	66–70	101–102*	82–80*
Benilde Blazers	69–75	74–87	—	69–66	74–66	71–74	71–67	57–88	77–72	75–63
EAC Generals	77–50	79–87	56–62	—	58–64	84–82	66–76	72–89	65–86	87–88
JRU Heavy Bombers	77–73	61–81	58–66	69–63	—	77–95	63–83	52–74	51–82	71–66
Lyceum Pirates	93–90	97–90	85–83	83–71	77–64	—	79–71	73–88	80–69	87–85
Mapúa Cardinals	93–67	105–101**	62–68	79–76	72–67	71–77	—	60–69	68–92	78–80
San Beda Red Lions	73–66	75–63	95–73	98–66	65–47	85–62	83–55	—	73–59	102–56
San Sebastian Stags	85–82	82–99	83–67	75–79	62–59	73–71	73–90	76–91	—	107–90
Perpetual Altas	86–91	69–88	85–83	76–80	77–66	74–89	81–85	62–75	94–99	—

Source: ABS-CBN Sports
Legend: Blue = left column team win; Red = top row team win.
Matches with lighter background shading were decided after overtime.

=== Bracket ===
Stepladder round 1 (Single-elimination)
3	Letran	85
4	San Sebastian	80

Stepladder round 2 (Single-elimination)
2	Lyceum	88
3	Letran	92

Finals (Best-of-three playoff)
1	San Beda	64	79	79
3	Letran	65	76	81

=== Stepladder semifinals ===
Both rounds are single-elimination.

==== (3) Letran vs. (4) San Sebastian ====
Letran is in its second consecutive playoffs appearance; San Sebastian is in its first appearance since 2017.

S+A

November 5
4:00 p.m.

Letran Knights	85–80	San Sebastian Stags
Scoring by quarter: 23–20, 27–20, 19–19, 16–21
Pts: Jerrick Balanza 15; Rebs: Fran Yu 7 Asts: Tommy Olivario 5		Pts: RK Ilagan 36; Rebs: Ken Villapando 9 Asts: Ilagan, Bulanadi 3 each
Letran advances to the Stepladder Semifinals Round 2

Cuneta Astrodome, Pasay

Letran was leading 69–52 when San Sebastian cut down the lead to six. Bonbon Batiller scored on two three-pointers to increase Letran's lead to 14, 77–63. RK Ilagan led the Stags to a final run late in the game, reducing the deficit to one point, 81–80 with less than two minutes left. Letran's defense prevented another scoring opportunity for the Stags though, and the Knights held on the win.

==== (2) Lyceum vs. (3) Letran ====
This is Lyceum's third consecutive playoffs appearance.

S+A

November 8
4:00 p.m.

Lyceum Pirates	88–92	Letran Knights
Scoring by quarter: 26–20, 14–24, 26–23, 22–25
Pts: Jaycee Marcelino 26; Rebs: Mike Nzeusseu 15; Asts: Reymar Caduyac 5		Pts: Fran Yu 20; Rebs: Larry Muyang 9 Asts: Yu, Batiller 6 each
Letran advances to the Finals

Cuneta Astrodome, Pasay

Lyceum was leading 70–69 when Letran went on a 15–2 run capped with a Jerrick Balanza three pointer midway in the fourth quarter to give them the lead 84–72. Lyceum cut the lead to three, 87–90, but the Knights converted their free-throws to put the game away for good. Balanza, Fran Yu and Larry Muyang scored on that crucial fourth quarter run to clinch the Knights' first Finals appearance since 2015.

=== Finals ===
This is a best-of-three playoff. This is a rematch of the 2015 Finals which Letran won; this was also their last Finals appearance, and San Beda's last Finals defeat. For three-time defending champion San Beda, this is their 14th consecutive Finals appearance. This is the latest installment of the San Beda–Letran rivalry.

November 12
4:00 p.m.

San Beda Red Lions	64–65	Letran Knights
Scoring by quarter: 18–17, 14–11, 12–19, 20–18
Pts: Evan Nelle 20; Rebs: Donald Tankoua 13; Asts: 3 players, 2 each		Pts: Edson Batiller 12; Rebs: Larry Muyang 8 Asts: Fran Yu 6

Mall of Asia Arena, Pasay
Attendance: 17,588

November 15
4:00 p.m.

Report

San Beda Red Lions	79–76	Letran Knights
Scoring by quarter: 18 –7, 19–18, 16–31, 26–20
Pts: James Kwekuteye 21; Rebs: Calvin Oftana 11; Asts: James Kwekuteye 6		Pts: Fran Yu 23; Rebs: Muyang, Caralipio 10 each Asts: Fran Yu 5

Mall of Asia Arena, Pasay
Attendance: 18,407

November 19
4:00 p.m.

San Beda Red Lions	79–81	Letran Knights
Scoring by quarter: 24–26, 14–18, 21–25, 20–12
Pts: Donald Tankuoa 22; Rebs: Calvin Oftana 8 Asts: Evan Nelle 9		Pts: Jerrick Balanza 27; Rebs: Jerrick Balanza 7 Asts: Fran Yu 7
Letran wins series, 2–1

Mall of Asia Arena, Pasay
Attendance: 19,876

- Finals Most Valuable Player: Fran Yu (Letran Knights)
- Coach of the Year: Bonnie Tan (Letran Knights)

In Game 1, San Beda posted manageable leads early in the game, with the halftime score at 32–28. Letran edged out San Beda in a low-scoring third quarter, 39–38. By the middle of the fourth quarter, the Red Lions were leading 58–56 when Fran Yu and Jerrick Balanza each scored a three-pointer, with Larry Muyang converting his free-throws to give Letran the lead 63–60 late in the fourth quarter. Cameroonian Donald Tankoua made a field-goal later on, cutting the lead to one, but Muyang converted a basket to pad the lead to three once again. Evan Nelle made a shot on the next play, bringing back the lead to one in favor of Letran. The Red Lions forced a turnover when Letran ran out the shot-clock with 12 seconds left. Calvin Oftana missed a three-pointer for San Beda that could've given them the lead; Fran Yu rebounded the ball, was fouled, and missed both free-throws, but San Beda failed to grab the rebound as time expired.

San Beda started Game 2 with a 15–0 run; Letran recovered at halftime, cutting San Beda's lead to 12 at 37–25. Letran first took the lead with a Muyang a free-throw of a foul to put the Knights up 44–41. Letran ended the third quarter on an 8–2 run, with Fran Yu converting two three-pointers, to put them up 56–53. In the middle of the fourth period, James Kwekuteye tied the score at 66–all. His San Beda teammate Calvin Oftana ended a 6–0 run to give San Beda a 72–66 lead. Letran then went on an 8–0 run, giving them a 2-point lead late in the fourth period. Oftana converted on a three-point play to give the Red Lions back the lead. On the next play, Bonbon Batiller missed on a close shot with 5.1 seconds left. James Canlas scored on free-throws on the next play to tie the series 1–1.

Letran started by trailing in the final game of the season, with San Beda taking a 19–12 lead, but ended the first quarter on a 14–5 run to take a 26–24 lead. The Red Lions then posted a 9–0 run themselves to tie the game 37–all, but Letran went on a 7–1 run to lead 44–38 at halftime. Letran then had a 7–0 run in the third to post their largest lead of 13. San Beda had their own 14–2 run to cut the deficit 70–71 at the start of the fourth quarter. Letran was leading 81–79 with 11.5 seconds after Evan Nelle scored on 2 consecutive three-pointers. On the next possession, Calvin Oftana forced a jump ball against Fran Yu; the Red Lions won the jump with 5.4 seconds left. Nelle attempted a championship-winning three-pointer, but was blocked, to give Letran their first championship since 2015. Fran Yu, who finished the game with eight points, five rebounds, seven assists and three steals, was named Finals MVP.

=== Awards ===
NCAA Season 95 men's basketball champions
Letran Knights
18th title

The awards were given prior to Game 2 of the men's Finals.

- Most Valuable Player: Calvin Oftana (San Beda Red Lions)
- Rookie of the Year: Justin Arana (Arellano Chiefs)
- Mythical Five:
  - Calvin Oftana (San Beda Red Lions)
  - Evan Nelle (San Beda Red Lions)
  - James Kwekuteye (San Beda Red Lions)
  - Allyn Bulanadi (San Sebastian Stags)
  - Jaycee Marcelino (Lyceum Pirates)
- Defensive Player of the Year: Justin Arana (Arellano Chiefs)
- All-Defensive Team:
  - Calvin Oftana (San Beda Red Lions)
  - Justin Arana (Arellano Chiefs)
  - Benedict Adamos (Perpetual Altas)
  - John Michael Calma (San Sebastian Stags)
  - John Paul Maguliano (EAC Generals)
- Most Improved Player: Fran Yu (Letran Knights)
- Best Foreign Player: Donald Tankoua (San Beda Red Lions)
- Best Defensive Foreign Player: Mike Harry Nzeusseu (Lyceum Pirates)

==== Player of the Week ====
The NCAA Press Corps awards a player of the week sponsored by Chooks-to-Go.

Week ending	Player	Team
July 13	(Philippines) Jethro Mendoza	EAC Generals
July 20	(Philippines) Bonbon Batiller	Letran Knights
July 27	(Philippines) Calvin Oftana	San Beda Red Lions
August 3	(Philippines) Edgar Charcos	Perpetual Altas
August 10	(Philippines) Laurenz Victoria	Mapúa Cardinals
August 17	(Philippines) Paolo Hernandez	Mapúa Cardinals
August 24	(Philippines) Justin Arana	Arellano Chiefs
August 31	(Philippines) Justin Gutang	Benilde Blazers
September 7	(Philippines) Jerrick Balanza	Letran Knights
September 14	(Philippines) Allyn Bulanadi	San Sebastian Stags
September 21	(Philippines) Kent Salado	Arellano Chiefs
September 28	(Philippines) Jaycee Marcelino	Lyceum Pirates
October 5	(Philippines) Evan Nelle	San Beda Red Lions
October 12	(Philippines) Calvin Oftana	San Beda Red Lions
October 19	(Philippines) Allyn Bulanadi	San Sebastian Stags

== Juniors' tournament ==
=== Elimination round ===
==== Team standings ====
Pos	Team	W	L	PCT	GB	Qualification
1	San Beda Red Cubs	17	1	.944	—	Twice-to-beat in the semifinals
2	Lyceum Junior Pirates	11	7	.611	6	Twice-to-beat in the semifinals
3	San Sebastian Staglets	10	8	.556 (Note: Head-to-head point differential: San Sebastian +8, LSGH +5, Arellano −13; fourth-seed playoff: LSGH 66–52 Arellano)	7	Twice-to-win in the semifinals
4	La Salle Green Hills Greenies	10	8	.556	7	Twice-to-win in the semifinals
5	Arellano Braves (H)	10	8	.556	7	
6	JRU Light Bombers	9	9	.500	8	
7	Letran Squires	8	10	.444	9	
8	Perpetual Junior Altas	7	11	.389	10	
9	Mapúa Red Robins	6	12	.333	11	
10	EAC–ICA Brigadiers	2	16	.111	15	

Updated to match(es) played on September 20, 2019. Source: ABS-CBN Sports
(H) Hosts

==== Match-up results ====
	Round 1									Round 2								
Team ╲ Game	1	2	3	4	5	6	7	8	9	10	11	12	13	14	15	16	17	18
Arellano	San Beda school colors	Letran school colors	JRU school colors	EAC school colors	UPHD school colors	Mapua school colors	CSB school colors	Lyceum school colors	SSC-R school colors	Lyceum school colors	San Beda school colors	UPHD school colors	Mapua school colors	CSB school colors	Letran school colors	EAC school colors	SSC-R school colors	JRU school colors
Letran	Lyceum school colors	Arellano school colors	JRU school colors	UPHD school colors	EAC school colors	Mapua school colors	CSB school colors	San Beda school colors	SSC-R school colors	JRU school colors	Mapua school colors	SSC-R school colors	CSB school colors	Lyceum school colors	San Beda school colors	Arellano school colors	UPHD school colors	EAC school colors
EAC–ICA	CSB school colors	Lyceum school colors	San Beda school colors	Letran school colors	Arellano school colors	JRU school colors	Mapua school colors	UPHD school colors	SSC-R school colors	San Beda school colors	JRU school colors	SSC-R school colors	UPHD school colors	Lyceum school colors	CSB school colors	Arellano school colors	Letran school colors	Mapua school colors
JRU	SSC-R school colors	San Beda school colors	Letran school colors	Arellano school colors	UPHD school colors	Lyceum school colors	EAC school colors	Mapua school colors	CSB school colors	Letran school colors	EAC school colors	San Beda school colors	Mapua school colors	SSC-R school colors	UPHD school colors	Lyceum school colors	CSB school colors	Arellano school colors
LSGH	EAC school colors	UPHD school colors	Mapua school colors	SSC-R school colors	San Beda school colors	Letran school colors	Arellano school colors	Lyceum school colors	JRU school colors	SSC-R school colors	Lyceum school colors	Letran school colors	Arellano school colors	UPHD school colors	EAC school colors	San Beda school colors	JRU school colors	Mapua school colors
Lyceum–Cavite	Letran school colors	EAC school colors	Mapua school colors	SSC-R school colors	JRU school colors	UPHD school colors	CSB school colors	San Beda school colors	Arellano school colors	Arellano school colors	UPHD school colors	CSB school colors	Letran school colors	Mapua school colors	EAC school colors	SSC-R school colors	JRU school colors	San Beda school colors
Malayan	UPHD school colors	SSC-R school colors	Lyceum school colors	CSB school colors	Letran school colors	Arellano school colors	EAC school colors	JRU school colors	San Beda school colors	Letran school colors	Arellano school colors	JRU school colors	Lyceum school colors	San Beda school colors	SSC-R school colors	UPHD school colors	CSB school colors	EAC school colors
San Beda–Rizal	Arellano school colors	JRU school colors	EAC school colors	SSC-R school colors	CSB school colors	Letran school colors	UPHD school colors	Lyceum school colors	Mapua school colors	EAC school colors	Arellano school colors	JRU school colors	SSC-R school colors	UPHD school colors	Letran school colors	Mapua school colors	CSB school colors	Lyceum school colors
San Sebastian	JRU school colors	Mapua school colors	Lyceum school colors	San Beda school colors	CSB school colors	UPHD school colors	Letran school colors	EAC school colors	Arellano school colors	CSB school colors	Letran school colors	San Beda school colors	EAC school colors	JRU school colors	Lyceum school colors	Mapua school colors	Arellano school colors	UPHD school colors
Perpetual	Mapua school colors	CSB school colors	Letran school colors	JRU school colors	Arellano school colors	SSC-R school colors	Lyceum school colors	San Beda school colors	EAC school colors	Lyceum school colors	Arellano school colors	San Beda school colors	EAC school colors	CSB school colors	JRU school colors	Letran school colors	Mapua school colors	SSC-R school colors

= Win; = OT win; = Loss; = OT loss

==== Scores ====
Results on top and to the right of the dashes are for first-round games; those to the bottom and to the left of it are second-round games.

Teams	AU	CSJL	EAC-ICA	JRU	LSGH	LPU-C	MHSS	SBU-R	SSC-R	UPHSD
Arellano Braves	—	79–72	76–67	70–68	66–74	64–81	63–56	67–69	68–73	78–70
Letran Squires	59–65	—	73–56	69–85	69–66	64–74	90–92	79–83	72–64	70–52
EAC-ICA Brigadiers	60–73	74–92	—	75–69	68–72	76–85	68–83	70–94	81–86*	70–71
JRU Light Bonbers	70–62	89–81	78–57	—	62–78	77–74	65–72*	80–99	72–68	88–83
La Salle Green Hills Greenies	67–70	79–83	81–51	76–72	—	68–74	95–90	99–98*	82–78*	59–81
Lyceum Pirates	76–61	71–83	83–71	70–69	87–95	—	101–66	97–99*	74–82	93–81
Malayan Red Robins	54–60	78–82	73–64	74–77	64–60	94–99	—	77–88	62–64	62–76
San Beda Red Cubs	58–54	108–80	83–58	88–68	94–87	111–82	91–82	—	89–73	95–76
San Sebastian Stags	63–60	86–81	95–87	94–91	90–86	72–82	74–69	79–88	—	62–67
Perpetual Junior Altas	62–86	81–77	86–90	76–85	71–81	93–88	61–74	97–100	81–76	—

Source: ABS-CBN Sports
Legend: Blue = left column team win; Red = top row team win.

=== Fourth seed playoff ===
This is a one-game playoff.

October 22
12:00 p.m.

La Salle Green Hills Greenies	66–52	Arellano Braves
Scoring by quarter: 16–13, 21–7, 20–10, 9–22
Pts: Jan Manansala 13; Rebs: Jan Manansala 8 Asts: Kobe Palencia 4		Pts: Miguel Sahali 13; Rebs: Chris Recto 12; Asts: Miguel Sahali 3
La Salle advances to the Final Four

Filoil Flying V Centre, San Juan

LSGH qualified to the Final Four with a 14-win point win against the Arellano Braves. They will face the San Beda Red Cubs, whose only defeat came from the Greenies.

=== Bracket ===
Semifinals (Top 2 twice-to-beat)
1	San Beda–Rizal	82
4	LSGH	79
2	Lyceum–Cavite	75	78
3	San Sebastian	84	76

Finals (Best-of-three playoff)
1	San Beda–Rizal	94	76	98
2	Lyceum–Cavite	80	78	77

=== Semifinals ===
San Beda and Lyceum have the twice-to-beat advantage.

==== (1) San Beda-Rizal vs. (4) LSGH ====
November 5
10:00 a.m.

San Beda Red Cubs	82–79	La Salle Green Hills Greenies
Scoring by quarter: 20–15, 15–16, 24–24, 23–24
Pts: Yukien Andrada 23; Rebs: Amsali, Sanchez 17 each Asts: Cyrus Llarena 4		Pts: JC Macalalag 23; Rebs: Jan Manansala 13; Asts: Kobe Palencia 5
San Beda wins series in one game

Cuneta Astrodome, Pasay

San Beda had three players with double-doubles in their semifinal win against LSGH. Yukien Andrada tied a game-high 23 points, with 13 coming in the fourth quarter to lead the Red Cubs.

==== (2) Lyceum-Cavite vs. (3) San Sebastian ====
November 5
1:00 p.m.

Lyceum Junior Pirates	75–84	San Sebastian Staglets
Scoring by quarter: 13–18, 20–24, 13–22, 29–20
Pts: John Barba 24; Rebs: John Barba 11; Asts: John Barba 7		Pts: Aguilar, Janao 15 each Rebs: Josel Barroga 11; Asts: Janao, Bulasa 4 each

Cuneta Astrodome, Pasay

November 8
1:00 p.m.

Lyceum Junior Pirates	78–76	San Sebastian Staglets
Scoring by quarter: 18–20, 19–24, 19–10, 22–22
Pts: John Barba 36; Rebs: Leonard Gamlanga 10; Asts: Mclaude Guadania 8		Pts: Dylan Darbin 18; Rebs: Janao, Barroga 9 each Asts: Dylan Darbin 4
Lyceum wins series in two games

Cuneta Astrodome, Pasay

The Staglets forced a rubber match against the Junior Pirates, with four players finishing in double figures. In the deciding Game 2, John Borba led the Junior Pirates to their first ever NCAA Finals appearance, with 36 points in 15/19 field-goal percentage.

=== Finals ===
This is a best-of-three playoff. This is the first NCAA basketball finals where both teams are based outside Metro Manila, with the Red Cubs based in Taytay. Rizal, and the Junior Pirates are based in General Trias, Cavite

November 12
1:00 p.m.

San Beda Red Cubs	94–80	Lyceum Junior Pirates
Scoring by quarter: 25–14, 22–27, 20–17, 27–22
Pts: Sanchez, Ynot, 16 each Rebs: Sanchez, Amsali, 14 each Asts: Alcantara, Alao, 4 each		Pts: Barba 21; Rebs: Omandac 7 Asts: Montano, Garing, 3 each

Mall of Asia Arena, Pasay

November 15
1:00 p.m.

Report

San Beda Red Cubs	74–79	Lyceum Junior Pirates
Scoring by quarter: 23–20, 13–14, 14–22, 24–23
Pts: Yukien Andrada 20; Rebs: Yukien Andrada 10; Asts: Charles Delfino 6		Pts: Mclaude Guadania 19; Rebs: Raphael Garro 12; Asts: Raphael Garro 7

Mall of Asia Arena, Pasay

November 19
1:00 p.m.

San Beda Red Cubs	98–77	Lyceum Junior Pirates
Scoring by quarter: 27–18, 23–15, 31–18, 17–26
Pts: Justin Sanchez 19; Rebs: Rhayyan Amsali 11; Asts: Ynot, Amsali, 4 each		Pts: Mclaude Guadania 24; Rebs: Montano, Garro, 7 each Asts: Gyle Montano 4
San Beda wins series, 2–1

Mall of Asia Arena, Pasay

- Finals Most Valuable Player: Rhayyan Amsali (San Beda Red Cubs)

The San Beda Red Cubs won their 23rd NCAA title after defeating the Lyceum Junior Pirates in Game 3 of the Finals. San Beda's Rhayyan Amsali was named Finals MVP, and Manu Inigo won his first title on his rookie season.

=== Awards ===
NCAA Season 95 juniors' basketball champions
San Beda Red Cubs
23rd title

- Most Valuable Player: John Ronald Barba (Lyceum Junior Pirates)
- Rookie of the Year: Jan Manansala (La Salle Green Hills Greenies)
- Mythical Five:
  - John Ronald Barba (Lyceum Junior Pirates)
  - Mac Guadana (Lyceum Junior Pirates)
  - Jonnel Policarpio (Mapúa Red Robins)
  - Yukien Andrada (San Beda Red Cubs)
  - Justine Sanchez (San Beda Red Cubs)
- Defensive Player of the Year: Jonnel Policarpio (Mapúa Red Robins)
- All-Defensive Team:
  - John Ronald Barba (Lyceum Junior Pirates)
  - Jonnel Policarpio (Mapúa Red Robins)
  - Yukien Andrada (San Beda Red Cubs)
  - Jan Manansala (La Salle Green Hills Greenies)
  - Shawn Umali (Letran Squires)
- Most Improved Player: Yukien Andrada (San Beda Red Cubs)

== See also ==
- UAAP Season 82 basketball tournaments

Preceded by Season 94 (2018)	NCAA men's basketball seasons Season 95 (2019)	Succeeded by Season 97 (2021–22)
Preceded by Season 94 (2018)	NCAA juniors' basketball seasons Season 95 (2019)	Succeeded by Season 98 (2023)
