= Karl Santos =

Filipino basketball coach

Converge FiberXers
- Position: Assistant coach
- League: PBA
- Coaching career: 2015–present

Career history

Coaching
- 2016–2019: La Salle Green Hills (assistant)
- 2019–2023: La Salle Green Hills
- 2022–present: Converge FiberXers (assistant)
- 2023–2026: UE Junior Warriors
- 2025–present: Letran HS

Career highlights
- As assistant coach: NCAA juniors champion (2017–18)

Karl Santos is a Filipino coach who currently serves as an assistant coach for the Converge FiberXers in the PBA.

== Career ==
Santos formerly served for La Salle Green Hills Greenies as an assistant coach, and later as head coach. He also served as head coach of UE Red Warriors junior's basketball team.
