= Miguel Oczon =

Filipino basketball player (born 2000)

No. 88 – Suwon KT Sonicboom
- Position: Shooting guard
- League: Korean Basketball League

Personal information
- Born: March 29, 2000 (age 26) Davao City, Philippines
- Listed height: 6 ft 0 in (182 cm)
- Listed weight: 165 lb (75 kg)

Career information
- High school: NU-Nazareth (Manila); Chiang Kai Shek (Manila)
- College: NU (2018–2019); Benilde (2021–2023)
- Playing career: 2023–present

Career history
- 2023–2025: Ulsan Hyundai Mobis Phoebus
- 2026–present: Suwon KT Sonicboom

Career highlights
- AsiaBasket Second Team (2023 Las Piñas)

Miguel Andre "Migs" Oczon (born March 29, 2000) is a Filipino professional basketball player for the Suwon KT Sonicboom of the Korean Basketball League (KBL).

== Professional career ==
=== Ulsan Hyundai Mobis Phoebus (2023–2025) ===
In December 2023, Oczon decided to forego his remaining two years of eligibility to play for the CSB Blazers in the NCAA as he signed a contract to play for the Ulsan Hyundai Mobis Phoebus in the KBL as a Filipino import. The St. Benilde guard averaged 13.17 points, 4.72 rebounds, and 2.78 assists per game in his last season in the collegiate ranks.

On January 6, 2024, topscorer Oczon hit a game-winning three with 10.5 seconds left to welcome himself with an Ulsan win over the Suwon KT Sonicboom, 83–82. He did the same for Ulsan with two straight triples in the last 15 seconds to defeat the tough-fighting KT, 91–89, on October 28, 2024.

On January 10, 2025, Oczon scored a career-high 31 points but his team lost to the Seoul SK Knights, 76–70.

On December 12, 2025, Oczon was dropped by Hyundai as the team's Asian import as he underwent surgery on his shoulder. He was replaced by Jake Figueroa.

== Personal life ==
Oczon, who wanted to give all-out support for his family in Davao City but had to suffer major injuries in college, said that he continues to learn the ethics of the game and respect outcomes.
