= 2023–24 PBA season =

48th PBA season

- Duration: November 5, 2023 – June 16, 2024
- Teams: 12
- TV partner(s): Local: RPTV (Note: Previously broadcast on CNN Philippines until January 28, 2024); A2Z (Note: Canceled and removed from the schedule after the Commissioner's Cup Finals Game 5); PBA Rush (HD); International: Pilipinas Live; Online: Cignal Play; Pilipinas Live

PBA season 48
- Top draft pick: Stephen Holt
- Picked by: Terrafirma Dyip
- Season MVP: June Mar Fajardo (San Miguel Beermen)
- Top scorer: Robert Bolick (NLEX Road Warriors)
- Commissioner's Cup champions: San Miguel Beermen
- Commissioner's Cup runners-up: Magnolia Chicken Timplados Hotshots
- Philippine Cup champions: Meralco Bolts
- Philippine Cup runners-up: San Miguel Beermen

Seasons
- ← 2022–23 2024–25 →

The 2023–24 PBA season (or PBA season 48) was the 48th season of the Philippine Basketball Association (PBA).

Due to the participation of Philippine men's national basketball team in the 2023 FIBA Basketball World Cup and 2022 Asian Games, the PBA season started on November 5, 2023 and would only have two conferences, first being the Commissioner's Cup, followed by the season-ending Philippine Cup.

Opening day was originally scheduled on October 15, but was moved three weeks past the original date to give the players who participated in the 2023 FIBA Basketball World Cup and the 2022 Asian Games time to rest and recover.

The first activity of the season was the PBA season 48 draft, held on September 17.

== Executive board ==
- Commissioner: Willie Marcial
- Chairman: Ricky Vargas (Representing TNT Tropang Giga)
- Vice-chairman: Demosthenes Rosales (Representing Terrafirma Dyip)
- Treasurer: Raymond Zorrilla (Representing Phoenix Super LPG Fuel Masters)

== Teams ==
Changes from previous season:

- The Bay Area Dragons, franchise team for the East Asia Super League, were rebranded as the "Chun Yu Bay Area Dragons", and were to return to play in the Commissioner's Cup as a guest team, having played in the same conference during the previous season. However, they were disbanded prior to the start of the first conference.
- Phoenix Super LPG Fuel Masters were rebranded as the "Phoenix Fuel Masters" prior to the Philippine Cup.

Team	Company	Governor	Coach	Captain
Barangay Ginebra San Miguel	Ginebra San Miguel, Inc.	Alfrancis Chua	Tim Cone	Jared Dillinger
Blackwater Bossing	Ever Bilena Cosmetics, Inc.	Silliman Sy	Jeffrey Cariaso	JVee Casio
Converge FiberXers	Converge ICT	Archen Cayabyab	Aldin Ayo	Kevin Racal
Magnolia Chicken Timplados Hotshots	San Miguel Pure Foods Company, Inc.	Rene Pardo	Chito Victolero	Rafi Reavis
Meralco Bolts	Manila Electric Company	Al Panlilio	Luigi Trillo	Raymond Almazan
NLEX Road Warriors	Metro Pacific Investments Corporation	Rodrigo Franco	Frankie Lim	Kevin Alas
NorthPort Batang Pier	Sultan 900 Capital, Inc.	Eric Arejola	Bonnie Tan	Jeff Chan
Phoenix Fuel Masters	Phoenix Petroleum Philippines, Inc.	Raymond Zorrilla	Jamike Jarin	RJ Jazul
Rain or Shine Elasto Painters	Asian Coatings Philippines, Inc.	Mamerto Mondragon	Yeng Guiao	Gabe Norwood
San Miguel Beermen	San Miguel Brewery, Inc.	Robert Non	Jorge Gallent	Chris Ross
Terrafirma Dyip	Terrafirma Realty Development Corporation	Demosthenes Rosales	Johnedel Cardel	Eric Camson
TNT Tropang Giga	Smart Communications	Ricky Vargas	Chot Reyes	Kelly Williams

== Arenas ==
Under the new normal, the PBA has resumed playing in venues in Metro Manila and Rizal. The PBA also released its schedule showing its first "out-of-town" games since the pandemic, with five game days held in the provinces.

=== Main arenas ===
Arena	City	Capacity
SM Mall of Asia Arena	Pasay	20,000
Araneta Coliseum	Quezon City	14,429
PhilSports Arena	Pasig	10,000
Ynares Center	Antipolo, Rizal	7,400
Rizal Memorial Coliseum	Manila	6,100
Ninoy Aquino Stadium	Manila	6,000
Caloocan Sports Complex	Caloocan	3,000
Ynares Sports Arena	Pasig	3,000

=== Out-of-town arenas ===
Arena	City/Town	Date	Match-up
Tiaong Convention Center	Tiaong, Quezon	November 25, 2023	Converge vs. San Miguel
Tiaong Convention Center	Tiaong, Quezon	April 20, 2024	Rain or Shine vs. Magnolia
FPJ Arena	San Jose, Batangas	December 9, 2023	Phoenix Super LPG vs. Barangay Ginebra
FPJ Arena	San Jose, Batangas	May 31, 2024	Meralco vs. Barangay Ginebra
Aquilino Q. Pimentel Jr. International Convention Center	Cagayan de Oro	December 16, 2023	Rain or Shine vs. Magnolia
Aquilino Q. Pimentel Jr. International Convention Center	Cagayan de Oro	April 27, 2024	Converge vs. Barangay Ginebra
University of San Agustin Gymnasium	Iloilo City	January 6, 2024	Magnolia vs. Meralco
Ibalong Centrum for Recreation	Legazpi, Albay	January 13, 2024	Barangay Ginebra vs. NLEX
Candon City Arena	Candon, Ilocos Sur	April 13, 2024	TNT vs. NLEX
Batangas City Sports Center	Batangas City	May 4, 2024	San Miguel vs. Meralco
Dasmariñas Arena	Dasmariñas, Cavite	May 22, 2024	Rain or Shine vs. San Miguel
Dasmariñas Arena	Dasmariñas, Cavite	May 22, 2024	Meralco vs. Barangay Ginebra

== Transactions ==
=== Retirement ===
- On May 12, 2023, Reynel Hugnatan formally retired after being signed by the Meralco Bolts as one of its assistant coaches. Hugnatan played for three teams in his 19 seasons in the league.

=== Coaching changes ===
Team	Previous coach	Replacement	Ref.
Blackwater Bossing	Ariel Vanguardia (interim)	Jeffrey Cariaso	
Meralco Bolts	Norman Black	Luigi Trillo	
Phoenix Super LPG Fuel Masters	Jamike Jarin (interim)	Jamike Jarin	

== Rule changes ==
The PBA competition committee approved the rule changes for implementation starting in the Commissioner's Cup games:

Rule changes (effective for the 2023–24 PBA Commissioner's Cup)
1. Players are no longer allowed to call timeouts
2. Coach's challenge is now in effect. A coach can contest a call once. If the challenge is successful, the coach will be given another coach's challenge. Challengeable calls are act of shooting or sideline throw-in, foul (common foul, charging or blocking), traveling, flopping, 8 second violation, backcourt violation, held ball, out-of-bounds or last touch and shot clock remaining.
3. If an intentional foul will be committed by a defensive player during fastbreak opportunity, the offensive team will be given one free throw plus ball possession.

== Notable events ==
=== Pre-season ===
- Several players were sanctioned by their respective teams and the PBA due to numerous ligang labas infractions.
- Due to the long off-season, the PBA launched the "PBA on Tour", a months-long series of pre-season games involving all PBA teams played across the country. Each team played 11 games and were allowed to have 17 players in their roster (but only 16 are allowed to play in a game) which are composed of regular players, 3x3 affiliate team players, free agents, and rookie aspirants. The tour was held from May 21 to July 30, 2023; there was no playoffs nor a championship series. The Magnolia Chicken Timplados Hotshots finished the tour with the best record, winning all of their 11 games.
- During the PBA on Tour, TNT Tropang Giga retired the jersey number of Harvey Carey (#4).
- The PBA competition committee proposed several rule changes, most notably the addition of the head coach challenge. Proposed new rules were first implemented during the PBA on Tour. After the tour, the league will assess which rules will be adapted starting the regular season.
- Willie Marcial will remain as the league's commissioner until the 2026–27 season as his contract was extended by the PBA Board of Governors.
- The PBA Board of Governors relaxed its rules regarding draft-eligible players who refuse to enter the draft and active PBA players who leave the league to play in another league locally or internationally. These players are no longer required to "sit out" seasons prior to joining the PBA. The former rule sanctioned these players by barring them from playing in the PBA for at most five years. Foreign-born Filipinos older than 30 years old are also now allowed to join the draft.
- The East Asia Super League disbanded the Bay Area Dragons on September 1, 2023, reportedly due to financial reasons. The EASL mentions "conflict of interest" for managing a team and organizing the league at the same time, as the official reason for dissolving the club.
- The PBA entered into an acquired agreement with ZOE Broadcasting Network and ABS-CBN Corporation to air the league's games on A2Z. All the ABS-CBN programs were temporarily affected by the changes in programming; A2Z's primetime, afternoon and weekend programming are preempted to give way for the PBA games on Wednesdays, Fridays and Sundays. Previously, the games were formerly broadcast on TV5.

=== Commissioner's Cup ===
- NorthPort Batang Pier team manager Pido Jarencio was fined ₱20,000 for hurling verbal threats at NLEX Road Warriors import Thomas Robinson during an elimination round game between the two teams.
- TV5 Network, Inc. entered into an acquired agreement with Nine Media Corporation (NMC) to broadcast selected PBA games on CNN Philippines every Saturday and Sunday.
- Starting from the finals, all PBA games were aired on RPTV, the channel that replaced the now-defunct news channel CNN Philippines. A2Z also canceled the broadcasting of PBA games after the finals' game 5.
- The league fined Converge FiberXers' Mac Tallo ₱100,000 and Phoenix Super LPG Fuel Masters' Chris Lalata ₱50,000 for ligang labas infractions. The FiberXers also subsequently terminated Tallo's contract.
- Magnolia Chicken Timplados Hotshots' Calvin Abueva was fined ₱100,000 for doing mocking gestures towards San Miguel Beermen's head coach Jorge Gallent during game 2 of the Finals.

=== Philippine Cup ===
- Phoenix Super LPG Fuel Masters changed their monicker to the original Phoenix Fuel Masters. The logo debuted on the press conference and on their first game this conference.
- March 31: Magnolia Chicken Timplados Hotshots' Calvin Abueva was fined ₱20,000 on flashing a dirty finger.
- April 3: The Rain or Shine Elasto Painters wore their throwback 2006 Welcoat Dragons jerseys for the first time. The retro jerseys were worn to honor the first brand the franchise carried from their days participating at the defunct Philippine Basketball League and their first two seasons in the PBA.
- May 1: San Miguel Beermen retired the jersey number of Arwind Santos (#29) during their game against Blackwater Bossing.
- June 1: The league announced that the operations of the PBA 3x3 will be indefinitely suspended.

== Opening ceremonies ==
Opening ceremony for this season was held at the Araneta Coliseum in Quezon City on November 5, 2023, hosted by comedians Jose Manalo and Wally Bayola. P-pop boy band Alamat were among the guest performers. The PBA Leo Awards for the 2022–23 season were held before the opening ceremonies.

The first game of the Commissioner's Cup between the Magnolia Chicken Timplados Hotshots and the TNT Tropang Giga was played after the opening ceremonies.

Below is the list of team muses:

Team	Muse
Barangay Ginebra San Miguel	Heaven Peralejo
Blackwater Bossing	Herlene Budol
Converge FiberXers	Yskaela Yaena Fujimoto
Magnolia Chicken Timplados Hotshots	Julie Anne San Jose
Meralco Bolts	Kaizen Dela Serna
NLEX Road Warriors	Vanie Gandler
NorthPort Batang Pier	Angel Santos
Phoenix Super LPG Fuel Masters	Yukii Takahashi
Rain or Shine Elasto Painters	Mary Jane Encabo and Jennelle Noblezada
San Miguel Beermen	Franki Russell
Terrafirma Dyip	Saira Khan
TNT Tropang Giga	Atasha Muhlach

== 2023–24 PBA Commissioner's Cup ==
The Commissioner's Cup started on November 5, 2023, and ended on February 14, 2024.

The conference is held first instead of the customary Philippine Cup, originally to accommodate guest team Bay Area Dragons which later got disbanded prior to the tournament.

=== Elimination round ===
Pos	Team	W	L	PCT	GB	Qualification
1	Magnolia Chicken Timplados Hotshots	9	2	.818	—	Twice-to-beat in quarterfinals
2	San Miguel Beermen	8	3	.727 (Note: Head-to-head quotient: San Miguel 1.17, Barangay Ginebra 0.99, Phoenix Super LPG 0.98, Meralco 0.89)	1	Twice-to-beat in quarterfinals
3	Barangay Ginebra San Miguel	8	3	.727	1	Twice-to-beat in quarterfinals
4	Phoenix Super LPG Fuel Masters	8	3	.727	1	Twice-to-beat in quarterfinals
5	Meralco Bolts	8	3	.727	1	Twice-to-win in quarterfinals
6	NorthPort Batang Pier	6	5	.545 (Note: Head-to-head record: NorthPort 1–0 Rain or Shine)	3	Twice-to-win in quarterfinals
7	Rain or Shine Elasto Painters	6	5	.545	3	Twice-to-win in quarterfinals
8	TNT Tropang Giga	5	6	.455	4	Twice-to-win in quarterfinals
9	NLEX Road Warriors	4	7	.364	5	
10	Terrafirma Dyip	2	9	.182	7	
11	Blackwater Bossing	1	10	.091 (Note: Head-to-head record: Blackwater 1–0 Converge)	8	
12	Converge FiberXers	1	10	.091	8	

Source: PBA.ph
Rules for classification: 1) winning percentage; 2) if two teams are tied, head-to-head record; if three or more teams are tied, head-to-head goal average (quotient); if tied for 8th, one-game playoff; 3) overall quotient; 4) coin toss

=== Playoffs ===
Quarterfinals (Top 4 twice-to-beat)
1	Magnolia	109
8	TNT	94
4	Phoenix Super LPG	107	88
5	Meralco	116***	84
2	San Miguel	127
7	Rain or Shine	122
3	Barangay Ginebra	106
6	NorthPort	93

Semifinals (Best-of-5)
1	Magnolia	3
4	Phoenix Super LPG	1
2	San Miguel	3
3	Barangay Ginebra	0

Finals (Best-of-7)
1	Magnolia	2
2	San Miguel	4

***Game went into triple overtime

==== Quarterfinals ====
Team 1	Series	Team 2	Game 1	Game 2
(1) Magnolia Chicken Timplados Hotshots*	1–0	(8) TNT Tropang Giga	109–94	—
(2) San Miguel Beermen*	1–0	(7) Rain or Shine Elasto Painters	127–122	—
(3) Barangay Ginebra San Miguel*	1–0	(6) NorthPort Batang Pier	106–93	—
(4) Phoenix Super LPG Fuel Masters*	1–1	(5) Meralco Bolts	107–116 (3OT)	88–84

*Team has twice-to-beat advantage. Team 1 only has to win once, while Team 2 has to win twice.

==== Semifinals ====
Team 1	Series	Team 2	Game 1	Game 2	Game 3	Game 4	Game 5
(1) Magnolia Chicken Timplados Hotshots	3–1	(4) Phoenix Super LPG Fuel Masters	82–79	82–78	85–103	89–79	—
(2) San Miguel Beermen	3–0	(3) Barangay Ginebra San Miguel	92–90	106–96	94–91	—	—

==== Finals ====
Team 1	Series	Team 2	Game 1	Game 2	Game 3	Game 4	Game 5	Game 6	Game 7
(1) Magnolia Chicken Timplados Hotshots	2–4	(2) San Miguel Beermen	95–103	85–109	88–80	96–85	98–108	102–104	—

- Finals MVP: CJ Perez (San Miguel Beermen)
- Best Player of the Conference: CJ Perez (San Miguel Beermen)
- Bobby Parks Best Import of the Conference: Johnathan Williams (Phoenix Super LPG Fuel Masters)

== 2024 PBA Philippine Cup ==
=== Elimination round ===
Pos	Team	W	L	PCT	GB	Qualification
1	San Miguel Beermen	10	1	.909	—	Twice-to-beat in the quarterfinals
2	Barangay Ginebra San Miguel	7	4	.636	3	Twice-to-beat in the quarterfinals
3	Meralco Bolts	6	5	.545 (Note: Head-to-head quotient: Meralco 1.06, TNT 1.03, Rain or Shine 1.01, NLEX 0.99, Magnolia 0.90)	4	Best-of-three quarterfinals
4	TNT Tropang Giga	6	5	.545	4	Best-of-three quarterfinals
5	Rain or Shine Elasto Painters	6	5	.545	4	Best-of-three quarterfinals
6	NLEX Road Warriors	6	5	.545	4	Best-of-three quarterfinals
7	Magnolia Chicken Timplados Hotshots	6	5	.545	4	Twice-to-win in the quarterfinals
8	Terrafirma Dyip	5	6	.455 (Note: Eighth seed playoff: Terrafirma 104–96 NorthPort)	5	Twice-to-win in the quarterfinals
9	NorthPort Batang Pier	5	6	.455	5	
10	Blackwater Bossing	4	7	.364	6	
11	Phoenix Fuel Masters	3	8	.273	7	
12	Converge FiberXers	2	9	.182	8	

Source: PBA.ph
Rules for classification: 1) winning percentage; 2) if two teams are tied, head-to-head record; if three or more teams are tied, head-to-head goal average (quotient); if tied for 8th, one-game playoff; 3) overall quotient; 4) coin toss

=== Playoffs ===
Quarterfinals
(#1 twice-to-beat)
1	San Miguel	95	110
8	Terrafirma	106	91
(Best-of-3)
4	TNT	1
5	Rain or Shine	2
(#2 twice-to-beat)
2	Barangay Ginebra	99
7	Magnolia	77
(Best-of-3)
3	Meralco	2
6	NLEX	0

Semifinals (Best-of-7)
1	San Miguel	4
5	Rain or Shine	0
2	Barangay Ginebra	3
3	Meralco	4

Finals (Best-of-7)
1	San Miguel	2
3	Meralco	4

==== Quarterfinals ====
Team 1	Series	Team 2	Game 1	Game 2
(1) San Miguel Beermen*	1–1	(8) Terrafirma Dyip	95–106	110–91
(2) Barangay Ginebra San Miguel*	1–0	(7) Magnolia Chicken Timplados Hotshots	99–77	—

Team 1	Series	Team 2	Game 1	Game 2	Game 3
(3) Meralco Bolts	2–0	(6) NLEX Road Warriors	97–93	100–91	—
(4) TNT Tropang Giga	1–2	(5) Rain or Shine Elasto Painters	116–99	113–121	109–110

*Team has twice-to-beat advantage. Team 1 only has to win once, while Team 2 has to win twice.

==== Semifinals ====
Team 1	Series	Team 2	Game 1	Game 2	Game 3	Game 4	Game 5	Game 6	Game 7
(1) San Miguel Beermen	4–0	(5) Rain or Shine Elasto Painters	101–98	106–89	117–107	107–100	—	—	—
(2) Barangay Ginebra San Miguel	3–4	(3) Meralco Bolts	92–88	91–103	80–87	90–71	89–84	81–86	69–78

==== Finals ====
Team 1	Series	Team 2	Game 1	Game 2	Game 3	Game 4	Game 5	Game 6	Game 7
(1) San Miguel Beermen	2–4	(3) Meralco Bolts	86–93	95–94	89–93	111–101	88–92	78–80	—

- Finals MVP: Chris Newsome (Meralco Bolts)
- Best Player of the Conference: June Mar Fajardo (San Miguel Beermen)

== Awards ==
=== Leo Awards ===
- Most Valuable Player: June Mar Fajardo (San Miguel)
- Rookie of the Year: Stephen Holt (Terrafirma)
- Most Improved Player: Jhonard Clarito (Rain or Shine)
- First Mythical Team:
  - June Mar Fajardo (San Miguel)
  - Christian Standhardinger (Barangay Ginebra)
  - Arvin Tolentino (NorthPort)
  - CJ Perez (San Miguel)
  - Chris Newsome (Meralco)
- Second Mythical Team:
  - Cliff Hodge (Meralco)
  - Calvin Oftana (TNT)
  - Jason Perkins (Phoenix)
  - Stephen Holt (Terrafirma)
  - Juami Tiongson (Terrafirma)
- All-Defensive Team:
  - Cliff Hodge (Meralco)
  - June Mar Fajardo (San Miguel)
  - Kemark Cariño (Terrafirma)
  - Joshua Munzon (NorthPort)
  - Chris Newsome (Meralco)
- Samboy Lim Sportsmanship Award: Paul Zamar (NorthPort)

=== PBA Press Corps annual awards ===
- Defensive Player of the Year: Cliff Hodge (Meralco)
- Scoring Champion: Robert Bolick (NLEX)
- Baby Dalupan Coaches of the Year: Luigi Trillo, Gene Afable, Reynel Hugnatan, Sandro Soriano, Nenad Vučinić, Norman Black (Meralco)
- Mr. Quality Minutes: Bong Quinto (Meralco)
- Bogs Adornado Comeback Players of the Year:
  - Ian Sangalang (Magnolia)
  - LA Tenorio (Barangay Ginebra)
- Danny Floro Executive of the Year: Alfrancis Chua (Barangay Ginebra)
- Order of Merit: June Mar Fajardo (San Miguel)
- All-Rookie Team:
  - Kemark Cariño (Terrafirma)
  - Cade Flores (NorthPort)
  - Stephen Holt (Terrafirma)
  - Adrian Nocum (Rain or Shine)
  - Kenneth Tuffin (Phoenix)
- Game of the Season: Meralco vs. San Miguel (June 16, 2024, Philippine Cup finals game 6)
- Lifetime Achievement Award: Robert Jaworski (Toyota / Ginebra)
- President's Award: Tim Cone (Barangay Ginebra / Gilas Pilipinas)

== Cumulative standings ==
Pos	Team	Pld	W	L	PCT	Best finish
1	San Miguel Beermen	44	33	11	.750	Champions
2	Meralco Bolts	39	25	14	.641	Champions
3	Magnolia Chicken Timplados Hotshots	34	21	13	.618	Finalist
4	Barangay Ginebra San Miguel	34	20	14	.588	Semifinalist
5	Rain or Shine Elasto Painters	30	14	16	.467	Semifinalist
6	Phoenix Fuel Masters	28	13	15	.464	Semifinalist
7	TNT Tropang Giga	26	12	14	.462	Quarterfinalist
8	NorthPort Batang Pier	24	11	13	.458	Quarterfinalist
9	NLEX Road Warriors	24	10	14	.417	Quarterfinalist
10	Terrafirma Dyip	25	9	16	.360	Quarterfinalist
11	Blackwater Bossing	22	5	17	.227	Elimination round
12	Converge FiberXers	22	3	19	.136	Elimination round

=== Elimination round ===
Pos	Team	Pld	W	L	PCT
1	San Miguel Beermen	22	18	4	.818
2	Barangay Ginebra San Miguel	22	15	7	.682
3	Magnolia Chicken Timplados Hotshots	22	15	7	.682
4	Meralco Bolts	22	14	8	.636
5	Rain or Shine Elasto Painters	22	12	10	.545
6	NorthPort Batang Pier	22	11	11	.500
7	TNT Tropang Giga	22	11	11	.500
8	Phoenix Fuel Masters	22	11	11	.500
9	NLEX Road Warriors	22	10	12	.455
10	Terrafirma Dyip	22	7	15	.318
11	Blackwater Bossing	22	5	17	.227
12	Converge FiberXers	22	3	19	.136

=== Playoffs ===
This includes one-game playoffs to determine the last playoff participant.

Pos	Team	Pld	W	L
1	San Miguel Beermen	22	15	7
2	Meralco Bolts	17	11	6
3	Magnolia Chicken Timplados Hotshots	12	6	6
4	Barangay Ginebra San Miguel	12	5	7
5	Terrafirma Dyip	3	2	1
6	Phoenix Fuel Masters	6	2	4
7	Rain or Shine Elasto Painters	8	2	6
8	TNT Tropang Giga	4	1	3
9	NorthPort Batang Pier	2	0	2
10	NLEX Road Warriors	2	0	2
11	Blackwater Bossing	0	0	0
12	Converge FiberXers	0	0	0

== PBA teams in Asian club competitions ==
Team	Competition	Progress
Rain or Shine Elasto Painters	2023 William Jones Cup	7th place
TNT Tropang Giga	2023–24 East Asia Super League	Group stage
Meralco Bolts	2023–24 East Asia Super League	Group stage

== 3x3 ==
The 3x3 season started on July 3, 2023, and ended on February 19, 2024.

=== First conference ===
Leg	Champion	Runner-up	Third place
1st	Barangay Ginebra San Miguel	San Miguel Beermen	Cavitex Braves
2nd	Barangay Ginebra San Miguel	Meralco Bolts 3x3	Cavitex Braves
3rd	TNT Triple Giga	Pioneer ElastoSeal Katibays	Cavitex Braves
4th	Cavitex Braves	TNT Triple Giga	Meralco Bolts 3x3
5th	Cavitex Braves	Pioneer ElastoSeal Katibays	Barangay Ginebra San Miguel
6th	TNT Triple Giga	Cavitex Braves	Wilcon Depot 3x3
Grand Finals	TNT Triple Giga	Cavitex Braves	Meralco Bolts 3x3

=== Second conference ===
Leg	Champion	Runner-up	Third place
1st	TNT Triple Giga	Cavitex Braves	Meralco Bolts 3x3
2nd	TNT Triple Giga	Terrafirma 3x3	Pioneer ElastoSeal Katibays
3rd	TNT Triple Giga	Cavitex Braves	Meralco Bolts 3x3
4th	MCFASolver Tech Centrale	Meralco Bolts 3x3	Pioneer ElastoSeal Katibays
5th	TNT Triple Giga	Pioneer ElastoSeal Katibays	MCFASolver Tech Centrale
6th	TNT Triple Giga	Cavitex Braves	Meralco Bolts 3x3
Grand Finals	TNT Triple Giga	Meralco Bolts 3x3	Pioneer ElastoSeal Katibays

=== Third conference ===
Leg	Champion	Runner-up	Third place
1st	Meralco Bolts 3x3	MCFASolver Tech Centrale	Cavitex Braves
2nd	MCFASolver Tech Centrale	San Miguel Beermen	Cavitex Braves
3rd	Meralco Bolts 3x3	TNT Triple Giga	MCFASolver Tech Centrale
4th	Meralco Bolts 3x3	TNT Triple Giga	Blackwater Smooth Razor
5th	TNT Triple Giga	Meralco Bolts 3x3	Cavitex Braves
6th	Cavitex Braves	Blackwater Smooth Razor	TNT Triple Giga
Grand Finals	Meralco Bolts 3x3	TNT Triple Giga	Cavitex Braves
