= 2023–24 PBA 3x3 season – Third conference =

Third conference of the 2023–24 PBA 3x3 season

The third conference of the 2023–24 PBA 3x3 season started on December 11, 2023 and ended on February 19, 2024. It will consist of six two-day legs and a grand final. Meralco Bolts 3x3 became the first Grand Champion after defeating TNT Triple Giga in the Grand Finals, 21–17.

== Teams ==
The players listed have played in at least one of the legs.

Team	Players					
Barangay Ginebra San Miguel	Franz Abuda	JJ Espanola	Ricky Peromingan	Joshua Ramirez	Ralph Salcedo	Nichole Ubalde
Blackwater Smooth Razor	Dariel Bayla	Brandrey Bienes	Hubert Cani	Wendell Comboy	RJ Deles	Rey Publico
Cavitex Braves	Clint Doliguez	Bong Galanza	Tonino Gonzaga	Kenneth Ighalo	Jorey Napoles	Philip Paniamogan
MCFASolver Tech Centrale	Yutien Andrada	Raphael Banal	Brandon Ramirez	Nico Salva	Terrence Tumalip	Louie Vigil
Meralco Bolts 3x3	Alfred Batino	Red Cachuela	Reymar Caduyac	Jeff Manday	Joseph Manlangit	Joseph Sedurifa
NorthPort Batang Pier	JR Alabanza	Gwyne Capacio	Damie Cuntapay	AJ Madrigal	Jan Sobrevega	Dexter Zamora
Pioneer ElastoSeal Katibays	Gian Abrigo	Wilson Baltazar	Enrique Caunan	Kenneth Mocon	Reggie Morido	Dennice Villamor
Purefoods TJ Titans	Christian Buñag	Martin Gozum	Rey Peralta	Buenaventura Raflores	Christian Rivera	Richard Velchez
San Miguel Beermen	John Apacible	Ken Bono	Jeremy Cruz	Paolo Javelona	James Mangahas	JP Sarao
Terrafirma 3x3	Shaq Alanes	Andre Duremdes	Mark Anthony Francisco	Jordan Rios	Jeremiah Taladua	Jason Tan
TNT Triple Giga	Samboy de Leon	Chris Exciminiano	Gryann Mendoza	Chester Saldua	Matt Salem	Almond Vosotros

== 1st leg ==
=== Groupings ===
Pool A	Pool B	Pool C
TNT Tropang Giga; Blackwater Smooth Razor; Terrafirma 3x3	Meralco Bolts 3x3 MCFASolver Tech Centrale; Purefoods TJ Titans; NorthPort Batang Pier	Cavitex Braves; Pioneer ElastoSeal Katibays; San Miguel Beermen; Barangay Ginebra San Miguel

=== Preliminary round ===
==== Pool A ====
Pos	Team	Pld	W	L	PF	PA	PD	PCT	Qualification
1	Blackwater Smooth Razor	2	2	0	42	20	+22	1.000	Quarterfinals
2	TNT Triple Giga	2	1	1	28	41	−13	.500	Quarterfinals
3	Terrafirma 3x3	2	0	2	32	41	−9	.000	

Source: PBA 3x3
Rules for classification: 1) Wins; Win ratio if unequal number of games; 2) Head-to-head record; 3) Average points per game; 4) Higher seed.

December 11
11:20 am

Report

TNT Triple Giga	21–19	Terrafirma 3x3

Glorietta

December 11
12:35 pm

Report

Blackwater Smooth Razor	20–13	Terrafirma 3x3

Glorietta

December 11
1:50 pm

Report

TNT Triple Giga	7–22	Blackwater Smooth Razor

Glorietta

==== Pool B ====
Pos	Team	Pld	W	L	PF	PA	PD	PCT	Qualification
1	MCFASolver Tech Centrale	3	3	0	48	40	+8	1.000	Quarterfinals
2	Meralco Bolts 3x3	3	2	1	56	46	+10	.667	Quarterfinals
3	Purefoods TJ Titans	3	1	2	48	54	−6	.333	Quarterfinals
4	NorthPort Batang Pier	3	0	3	45	57	−12	.000	

Source: PBA 3x3
Rules for classification: 1) Wins; Win ratio if unequal number of games; 2) Head-to-head record; 3) Average points per game; 4) Higher seed.

December 11
10:30 am

Report

Meralco Bolts 3x3	14–16	MCFASolver Tech Centrale

Glorietta

December 11
11:45 am

Report

NorthPort Batang Pier	16–21	Meralco Bolts 3x3

Glorietta

December 11
1:00 pm

Report

NorthPort Batang Pier	17–20	Purefoods TJ Titans

Glorietta

December 11
2:15 pm

Report

Purefoods TJ Titans	14–21	Meralco Bolts 3x3

Glorietta

December 11
3:05 pm

Report

MCFASolver Tech Centrale	16–12	NorthPort Batang Pier

Glorietta

December 12
10:30 am

Report

MCFASolver Tech Centrale	16–14	Purefoods TJ Titans

Glorietta

==== Pool C ====
Pos	Team	Pld	W	L	PF	PA	PD	PCT	Qualification
1	Cavitex Braves	3	3	0	63	41	+22	1.000	Quarterfinals
2	Barangay Ginebra San Miguel	3	2	1	52	48	+4	.667	Quarterfinals
3	Pioneer ElastoSeal Katibays	3	1	2	54	55	−1	.333	Quarterfinals
4	San Miguel Beermen	3	0	3	39	64	−25	.000	

Source: PBA 3x3
Rules for classification: 1) Wins; Win ratio if unequal number of games; 2) Head-to-head record; 3) Average points per game; 4) Higher seed.

December 11
10:55 am

Report

San Miguel Beermen	11–21	Cavitex Braves

Glorietta

December 11
12:10 pm

Report

Pioneer ElastoSeal Katibays	21–17	San Miguel Beermen

Glorietta

December 11
1:25 pm

Report

Cavitex Braves	21–13	Barangay Ginebra San Miguel

Glorietta

December 11
2:40 pm

Report

Barangay Ginebra San Miguel	22–11	San Miguel Beermen

Glorietta

December 11
3:30 pm

Report

Cavitex Braves	21–17	Pioneer ElastoSeal Katibays

Glorietta

December 12
10:55 am

Report

Pioneer ElastoSeal Katibays	16–17	Barangay Ginebra San Miguel

Glorietta

=== Knockout stage ===
Meralco Bolts 3x3 defeated MCFASolver Tech Centrale in the finals, 15–13, to become the first leg winners.

==== Bracket ====
Quarterfinals
A1	Blackwater Smooth Razor	16
B3	Purefoods TJ Titans	18
C2	Barangay Ginebra San Miguel	16
B2	Meralco Bolts 3x3	21
B1	MCFASolver Tech Centrale	18
C3	Pioneer ElastoSeal Katibays	15
C1	Cavitex Braves	19
A2	TNT Triple Giga	17

Semifinals
B3	Purefoods TJ Titans	13
B2	Meralco Bolts 3x3	21
B1	MCFASolver Tech Centrale	20
C1	Cavitex Braves	19

Finals
B2	Meralco Bolts 3x3	15
B1	MCFASolver Tech Centrale	13
Third place
B3	Purefoods TJ Titans	18
C1	Cavitex Braves	21

==== Quarterfinals ====
December 12
11:20 am

Report

Blackwater Smooth Razor	16–18	Purefoods TJ Titans

Glorietta

December 12
11:45 am

Report

Barangay Ginebra San Miguel	16–21	Meralco Bolts 3x3

Glorietta

December 12
12:10 pm

Report

MCFASolver Tech Centrale	18–15	Pioneer ElastoSeal Katibays

Glorietta

December 12
12:35 pm

Report

Cavitex Braves	19–17	TNT Triple Giga

Glorietta

==== Semifinals ====
December 12
1:00 pm

Report

Purefoods TJ Titans	13–21	Meralco Bolts 3x3

Glorietta

December 12
1:25 pm

Report

MCFASolver Tech Centrale	20–19	Cavitex Braves

Glorietta

==== Third place game ====
December 12
2:10 pm

Report

Purefoods TJ Titans	18–21	Cavitex Braves

Glorietta

==== Finals ====
December 12
2:35 pm

Report

Meralco Bolts 3x3	15–13	MCFASolver Tech Centrale

Glorietta

=== Final standings ===
Pos	Team	Pld	W	L	PCT	AVG	PF	Tour points
1	Meralco Bolts 3x3	6	5	1	.833	18.8	113	100
2	MCFASolver Tech Centrale	6	5	1	.833	16.5	99	80
3	Cavitex Braves	6	5	1	.833	20.3	122	70
4	Purefoods TJ Titans	6	2	4	.333	16.2	97	60
Eliminated at the quarterfinals
5	Blackwater Smooth Razor	3	2	1	.667	19.3	58	50
6	Barangay Ginebra San Miguel	4	2	2	.500	17.0	68	45
7	TNT Triple Giga	3	1	2	.333	15.0	45	40
8	Pioneer ElastoSeal Katibays	4	1	3	.250	17.3	69	35
Eliminated at the preliminary round
9	Terrafirma 3x3	2	0	2	.000	16.0	32	20
10	NorthPort Batang Pier	3	0	3	.000	15.0	45	18
11	San Miguel Beermen	3	0	3	.000	13.0	39	16

Source: PBA 3x3

== 2nd leg ==
=== Groupings ===
Pool A	Pool B	Pool C
Meralco Bolts 3x3 (1); Barangay Ginebra San Miguel (6); TNT Tropang Giga (7)	MCFASolver Tech Centrale (2); Blackwater Smooth Razor (5); Pioneer ElastoSeal Katibays (8); San Miguel Beermen (11)	Cavitex Braves (3); Purefoods TJ Titans (4); Terrafirma 3x3 (9); NorthPort Batang Pier (10)

=== Preliminary round ===
==== Pool A ====
Pos	Team	Pld	W	L	PF	PA	PD	PCT	Qualification
1	Meralco Bolts 3x3	2	2	0	42	27	+15	1.000	Quarterfinals
2	TNT Triple Giga	2	1	1	35	28	+7	.500	Quarterfinals
3	Barangay Ginebra San Miguel	2	0	2	20	42	−22	.000	

Source: PBA 3x3
Rules for classification: 1) Wins; Win ratio if unequal number of games; 2) Head-to-head record; 3) Average points per game; 4) Higher seed.

January 8
11:50 am

Report

Meralco Bolts 3x3	21–14	TNT Triple Giga

Ayala Malls Manila Bay

January 8
1:05 pm

Report

Barangay Ginebra San Miguel	7–21	TNT Triple Giga

Ayala Malls Manila Bay

January 8
2:20 pm

Report

Meralco Bolts 3x3	21–13	Barangay Ginebra San Miguel

Ayala Malls Manila Bay

==== Pool B ====
Pos	Team	Pld	W	L	PF	PA	PD	PCT	Qualification
1	MCFASolver Tech Centrale	3	2	1	57	56	+1	.667 (Note: MCFASolver Tech Centrale 2nd seed, San Miguel Beermen 11th seed)	Quarterfinals
2	San Miguel Beermen	3	2	1	57	48	+9	.667	Quarterfinals
3	Blackwater Smooth Razor	3	2	1	43	38	+5	.667	Quarterfinals
4	Pioneer ElastoSeal Katibays	3	0	3	38	53	−15	.000	

Source: PBA 3x3
Rules for classification: 1) Wins; Win ratio if unequal number of games; 2) Head-to-head record; 3) Average points per game; 4) Higher seed.
Notes:

January 8
11:00 am

Report

MCFASolver Tech Centrale	17–15	Blackwater Smooth Razor

Ayala Malls Manila Bay

January 8
12:15 pm

Report

San Miguel Beermen	21–19	MCFASolver Tech Centrale

Ayala Malls Manila Bay

January 8
1:30 pm

Report

San Miguel Beermen	21–12	Pioneer ElastoSeal Katibays

Ayala Malls Manila Bay

January 8
2:45 pm

Report

Pioneer ElastoSeal Katibays	20–21	MCFASolver Tech Centrale

Ayala Malls Manila Bay

January 8
3:35 pm

Report

Blackwater Smooth Razor	17–15	San Miguel Beermen

Ayala Malls Manila Bay

January 9
11:00 am

Report

Blackwater Smooth Razor	11–6	Pioneer ElastoSeal Katibays

Ayala Malls Manila Bay

==== Pool C ====
Pos	Team	Pld	W	L	PF	PA	PD	PCT	Qualification
1	Cavitex Braves	3	3	0	64	43	+21	1.000	Quarterfinals
2	Purefoods TJ Titans	3	2	1	59	56	+3	.667	Quarterfinals
3	Terrafirma 3x3	3	1	2	56	61	−5	.333	Quarterfinals
4	NorthPort Batang Pier	3	0	3	42	61	−19	.000	

Source: PBA 3x3
Rules for classification: 1) Wins; Win ratio if unequal number of games; 2) Head-to-head record; 3) Average points per game; 4) Higher seed.

January 8
11:25 am

Report

Terrafirma 3x3	15–22	Cavitex Braves

Ayala Malls Manila Bay

January 8
12:40 pm

Report

Purefoods TJ Titans	21–20	Terrafirma 3x3

Ayala Malls Manila Bay

January 8
1:55 pm

Report

Cavitex Braves	21–9	NorthPort Batang Pier

Ayala Malls Manila Bay

January 8
3:10 pm

Report

NorthPort Batang Pier	18–21	Terrafirma 3x3

Ayala Malls Manila Bay

January 8
4:00 pm

Report

Cavitex Braves	21–19	Purefoods TJ Titans

Ayala Malls Manila Bay

January 9
11:25 am

Report

Purefoods TJ Titans	19–15	NorthPort Batang Pier

Ayala Malls Manila Bay

=== Knockout stage ===
MCFASolver Tech Centrale defeated San Miguel Beermen in the finals, 19–17, to become the second leg winners.

==== Bracket ====
Quarterfinals
A1	Meralco Bolts 3x3	20
B3	Blackwater Smooth Razor	22
C2	Purefoods TJ Titans	17
B2	San Miguel Beermen	20
B1	MCFASolver Tech Centrale	21
C3	Terrafirma 3x3	16
C1	Cavitex Braves	22
A2	TNT Triple Giga	16

Semifinals
B3	Blackwater Smooth Razor	16
B2	San Miguel Beermen	21
B1	MCFASolver Tech Centrale	21
C1	Cavitex Braves	19

Finals
B2	San Miguel Beermen	17
B1	MCFASolver Tech Centrale	19
Third place
B3	Blackwater Smooth Razor	19
C1	Cavitex Braves	20

==== Quarterfinals ====
January 9
11:50 am

Report

Meralco Bolts 3x3	20–22	Blackwater Smooth Razor

Ayala Malls Manila Bay

January 9
12:15 pm

Report

Purefoods TJ Titans	17–20	San Miguel Beermen

Ayala Malls Manila Bay

January 9
12:40 pm

Report

MCFASolver Tech Centrale	21–16	Terrafirma 3x3

Ayala Malls Manila Bay

January 9
1:05 pm

Report

Cavitex Braves	22–16	TNT Triple Giga

Ayala Malls Manila Bay

==== Semifinals ====
January 9
1:30 pm

Report

Blackwater Smooth Razor	16–21	San Miguel Beermen

Ayala Malls Manila Bay

January 9
1:55 pm

Report

MCFASolver Tech Centrale	21–19	Cavitex Braves

Ayala Malls Manila Bay

==== Third place game ====
January 9
2:25 pm

Report

Blackwater Smooth Razor	19–20	Cavitex Braves

Ayala Malls Manila Bay

==== Finals ====
January 9
2:50 pm

Report

San Miguel Beermen	17–19	MCFASolver Tech Centrale

Ayala Malls Manila Bay

=== Final standings ===
Pos	Team	Pld	W	L	PCT	AVG	PF	Tour points
1	MCFASolver Tech Centrale	6	5	1	.833	19.7	118	100
2	San Miguel Beermen	6	4	2	.667	19.2	115	80
3	Cavitex Braves	6	5	1	.833	20.8	125	70
4	Blackwater Smooth Razor	6	3	3	.500	16.7	100	60
Eliminated at the quarterfinals
5	Meralco Bolts 3x3	3	2	1	.667	20.7	62	50
6	Purefoods TJ Titans	4	2	2	.500	19.0	76	45
7	TNT Triple Giga	3	1	2	.333	17.0	51	40
8	Terrafirma 3x3	4	1	3	.250	18.0	72	35
Eliminated at the preliminary round
9	NorthPort Batang Pier	3	0	3	.000	14.0	42	20
10	Pioneer ElastoSeal Katibays	3	0	3	.000	12.7	38	18
11	Barangay Ginebra San Miguel	2	0	2	.000	10.0	20	16

Source: PBA 3x3

== 3rd leg ==
=== Groupings ===
Pool A	Pool B	Pool C
MCFASolver Tech Centrale (1); Purefoods TJ Titans (6); TNT Tropang Giga (7)	San Miguel Beermen (2); Meralco Bolts 3x3 (5); Terrafirma 3x3 (8); Barangay Ginebra San Miguel (11)	Cavitex Braves (3); Blackwater Smooth Razor (4); NorthPort Batang Pier (9); Pioneer ElastoSeal Katibays (10)

=== Preliminary round ===
==== Pool A ====
Pos	Team	Pld	W	L	PF	PA	PD	PCT	Qualification
1	TNT Triple Giga	2	2	0	41	23	+18	1.000	Quarterfinals
2	MCFASolver Tech Centrale	2	1	1	31	39	−8	.500	Quarterfinals
3	Purefoods TJ Titans	2	0	2	31	41	−10	.000	

Source: PBA 3x3
Rules for classification: 1) Wins; Win ratio if unequal number of games; 2) Head-to-head record; 3) Average points per game; 4) Higher seed.

January 15
11:50 am

Report

MCFASolver Tech Centrale	10–21	TNT Triple Giga

Fairview Terraces

January 15
1:05 pm

Report

Purefoods TJ Titans	13–20	TNT Triple Giga

Fairview Terraces

January 15
2:20 pm

Report

MCFASolver Tech Centrale	21–18	Purefoods TJ Titans

Fairview Terraces

==== Pool B ====
Pos	Team	Pld	W	L	PF	PA	PD	PCT	Qualification
1	Meralco Bolts 3x3	3	3	0	64	43	+21	1.000	Quarterfinals
2	San Miguel Beermen	3	1	2	57	59	−2	.333	Quarterfinals
3	Terrafirma 3x3	3	1	2	50	58	−8	.333	Quarterfinals
4	Barangay Ginebra San Miguel	3	1	2	47	58	−11	.333	

Source: PBA 3x3
Rules for classification: 1) Wins; Win ratio if unequal number of games; 2) Head-to-head record; 3) Average points per game; 4) Higher seed.

January 15
11:00 am

Report

San Miguel Beermen	16–21	Meralco Bolts 3x3

Fairview Terraces

January 15
12:15 pm

Report

Barangay Ginebra San Miguel	17–21	San Miguel Beermen

Fairview Terraces

January 15
1:30 pm

Report

Barangay Ginebra San Miguel	17–15	Terrafirma 3x3

Fairview Terraces

January 15
2:45 pm

Report

Terrafirma 3x3	21–20	San Miguel Beermen

Fairview Terraces

January 15
3:35 pm

Report

Meralco Bolts 3x3	22–13	Barangay Ginebra San Miguel

Fairview Terraces

January 16
11:00 am

Report

Meralco Bolts 3x3	21–14	Terrafirma 3x3

Fairview Terraces

==== Pool C ====
Pos	Team	Pld	W	L	PF	PA	PD	PCT	Qualification
1	Pioneer ElastoSeal Katibays	3	3	0	58	43	+15	1.000	Quarterfinals
2	Cavitex Braves	3	2	1	60	47	+13	.667	Quarterfinals
3	NorthPort Batang Pier	3	1	2	46	61	−15	.333	Quarterfinals
4	Blackwater Smooth Razor	3	0	3	46	59	−13	.000	

Source: PBA 3x3
Rules for classification: 1) Wins; Win ratio if unequal number of games; 2) Head-to-head record; 3) Average points per game; 4) Higher seed.

January 15
11:25 am

Report

NorthPort Batang Pier	14–21	Cavitex Braves

Fairview Terraces

January 15
12:40 pm

Report

Blackwater Smooth Razor	19–20	NorthPort Batang Pier

Fairview Terraces

January 15
1:55 pm

Report

Cavitex Braves	18–19	Pioneer ElastoSeal Katibays

Fairview Terraces

January 15
3:10 pm

Report

Pioneer ElastoSeal Katibays	21–12	NorthPort Batang Pier

Fairview Terraces

January 15
4:00 pm

Report

Cavitex Braves	21–14	Blackwater Smooth Razor

Fairview Terraces

January 16
11:25 am

Report

Blackwater Smooth Razor	13–18	Pioneer ElastoSeal Katibays

Fairview Terraces

=== Knockout stage ===
Meralco Bolts 3x3 defeated TNT Triple Giga in the finals, 19–18, to become the third leg winners.

==== Bracket ====
Quarterfinals
A1	TNT Triple Giga	22
B3	Terrafirma 3x3	8
C2	Cavitex Braves	16
B2	San Miguel Beermen	21
B1	Meralco Bolts 3x3	11
C3	NorthPort Batang Pier	9
C1	Pioneer ElastoSeal Katibays	10
A2	MCFASolver Tech Centrale	19

Semifinals
A1	TNT Triple Giga	21
B2	San Miguel Beermen	17
B1	Meralco Bolts 3x3	21
A2	MCFASolver Tech Centrale	19

Finals
A1	TNT Triple Giga	18
B1	Meralco Bolts 3x3	19
Third place
B2	San Miguel Beermen	12
A2	MCFASolver Tech Centrale	15

==== Quarterfinals ====
January 16
11:50 am

Report

TNT Triple Giga	22–8	Terrafirma 3x3

Fairview Terraces

January 16
12:15 pm

Report

Cavitex Braves	16–21	San Miguel Beermen

Fairview Terraces

January 16
12:40 pm

Report

Meralco Bolts 3x3	11–9	NorthPort Batang Pier

Fairview Terraces

January 16
1:05 pm

Report

Pioneer ElastoSeal Katibays	10–19	MCFASolver Tech Centrale

Fairview Terraces

==== Semifinals ====
January 16
1:30 pm

Report

TNT Triple Giga	21–17	San Miguel Beermen

Fairview Terraces

January 16
1:55 pm

Report

Meralco Bolts 3x3	21–19	MCFASolver Tech Centrale

Fairview Terraces

==== Third place game ====
January 16
2:25 pm

Report

San Miguel Beermen	12–15	MCFASolver Tech Centrale

Fairview Terraces

==== Finals ====
January 16
2:50 pm

Report

TNT Triple Giga	18–19	Meralco Bolts 3x3

Fairview Terraces

=== Final standings ===
Pos	Team	Pld	W	L	PCT	AVG	PF	Tour points
1	Meralco Bolts 3x3	6	6	0	1.000	19.2	115	100
2	TNT Triple Giga	5	4	1	.800	20.4	102	80
3	MCFASolver Tech Centrale	5	3	2	.600	16.8	84	70
4	San Miguel Beermen	6	2	4	.333	17.8	107	60
Eliminated at the quarterfinals
5	Pioneer ElastoSeal Katibays	4	3	1	.750	17.0	68	50
6	Cavitex Braves	4	2	2	.500	19.0	76	45
7	Terrafirma 3x3	4	1	3	.250	14.5	58	40
8	NorthPort Batang Pier	4	1	3	.250	13.8	55	35
Eliminated at the preliminary round
9	Barangay Ginebra San Miguel	3	1	2	.333	15.7	47	20
10	Purefoods TJ Titans	2	0	2	.000	15.5	31	18
11	Blackwater Smooth Razor	3	0	3	.000	15.3	46	16

Source: PBA 3x3

== 4th leg ==
=== Groupings ===
Pool A	Pool B	Pool C
Meralco Bolts 3x3 (1); Cavitex Braves (6); Terrafirma 3x3 (7)	TNT Tropang Giga (2); Pioneer ElastoSeal Katibays (5); NorthPort Batang Pier (8); Blackwater Smooth Razor (11)	MCFASolver Tech Centrale (3); San Miguel Beermen (4); Barangay Ginebra San Miguel (9); Purefoods TJ Titans (10)

=== Preliminary round ===
==== Pool A ====
Pos	Team	Pld	W	L	PF	PA	PD	PCT	Qualification
1	Meralco Bolts 3x3	2	2	0	43	23	+20	1.000	Quarterfinals
2	Cavitex Braves	2	1	1	33	41	−8	.500	Quarterfinals
3	Terrafirma 3x3	2	0	2	29	41	−12	.000	

Source: PBA 3x3
Rules for classification: 1) Wins; Win ratio if unequal number of games; 2) Head-to-head record; 3) Average points per game; 4) Higher seed.

January 22
10:50 am

Report

Meralco Bolts 3x3	21–10	Terrafirma 3x3

Ayala Malls Circuit

January 22
12:05 pm

Report

Cavitex Braves	20–19	Terrafirma 3x3

Ayala Malls Circuit

January 22
1:20 pm

Report

Meralco Bolts 3x3	22–13	Cavitex Braves

Ayala Malls Circuit

==== Pool B ====
Pos	Team	Pld	W	L	PF	PA	PD	PCT	Qualification
1	TNT Triple Giga	3	3	0	57	44	+13	1.000	Quarterfinals
2	Blackwater Smooth Razor	3	2	1	53	50	+3	.667	Quarterfinals
3	NorthPort Batang Pier	3	1	2	44	55	−11	.333	Quarterfinals
4	Pioneer ElastoSeal Katibays	3	0	3	41	46	−5	.000	

Source: PBA 3x3
Rules for classification: 1) Wins; Win ratio if unequal number of games; 2) Head-to-head record; 3) Average points per game; 4) Higher seed.

January 22
10:00 am

Report

TNT Triple Giga	15–14	Pioneer ElastoSeal Katibays

Ayala Malls Circuit

January 22
11:15 am

Report

Blackwater Smooth Razor	15–21	TNT Triple Giga

Ayala Malls Circuit

January 22
12:30 pm

Report

Blackwater Smooth Razor	22–14	NorthPort Batang Pier

Ayala Malls Circuit

January 22
1:45 pm

Report

NorthPort Batang Pier	15–21	TNT Triple Giga

Ayala Malls Circuit

January 22
2:35 pm

Report

Pioneer ElastoSeal Katibays	15–16	Blackwater Smooth Razor

Ayala Malls Circuit

January 23
10:00 am

Report

Pioneer ElastoSeal Katibays	12–15	NorthPort Batang Pier

Ayala Malls Circuit

==== Pool C ====
Pos	Team	Pld	W	L	PF	PA	PD	PCT	Qualification
1	MCFASolver Tech Centrale	3	2	1	58	49	+9	.667 (Note: MCFASolver Tech Centrale 1–0 San Miguel Beermen)	Quarterfinals
2	San Miguel Beermen	3	2	1	51	55	−4	.667	Quarterfinals
3	Purefoods TJ Titans	3	1	2	50	49	+1	.333 (Note: Purefoods TJ Titans 1–0 Barangay Ginebra San Miguel)	Quarterfinals
4	Barangay Ginebra San Miguel	3	1	2	53	59	−6	.333	

Source: PBA 3x3
Rules for classification: 1) Wins; Win ratio if unequal number of games; 2) Head-to-head record; 3) Average points per game; 4) Higher seed.
Notes:

January 22
10:25 am

Report

Barangay Ginebra San Miguel	21–18	MCFASolver Tech Centrale

Ayala Malls Circuit

January 22
11:40 am

Report

San Miguel Beermen	21–20	Barangay Ginebra San Miguel

Ayala Malls Circuit

January 22
12:55 pm

Report

MCFASolver Tech Centrale	18–17	Purefoods TJ Titans

Ayala Malls Circuit

January 22
2:10 pm

Report

Purefoods TJ Titans	20–12	Barangay Ginebra San Miguel

Ayala Malls Circuit

January 22
3:00 pm

Report

MCFASolver Tech Centrale	22–11	San Miguel Beermen

Ayala Malls Circuit

January 23
10:25 am

Report

San Miguel Beermen	19–13	Purefoods TJ Titans

Ayala Malls Circuit

=== Knockout stage ===
Meralco Bolts 3x3 defeated TNT Triple Giga in the finals, 21–13, to become the fourth leg winners.

==== Bracket ====
Quarterfinals
A1	Meralco Bolts 3x3	21
B3	NorthPort Batang Pier	17
C2	San Miguel Beermen	16
B2	Blackwater Smooth Razor	17
B1	TNT Triple Giga	21
C3	Purefoods TJ Titans	9
C1	MCFASolver Tech Centrale	21
A2	Cavitex Braves	18

Semifinals
A1	Meralco Bolts 3x3	21
B2	Blackwater Smooth Razor	15
B1	TNT Triple Giga	22
C1	MCFASolver Tech Centrale	18

Finals
A1	Meralco Bolts 3x3	21
B1	TNT Triple Giga	13
Third place
B2	Blackwater Smooth Razor	21
C1	MCFASolver Tech Centrale	18

==== Quarterfinals ====
January 23
10:50 am

Report

Meralco Bolts 3x3	21–17	NorthPort Batang Pier

Ayala Malls Circuit

January 23
11:15 am

Report

San Miguel Beermen	16–17	Blackwater Smooth Razor

Ayala Malls Circuit

January 23
11:40 am

Report

TNT Triple Giga	21–9	Purefoods TJ Titans

Ayala Malls Circuit

January 23
12:05 pm

Report

MCFASolver Tech Centrale	21–18	Cavitex Braves

Ayala Malls Circuit

==== Semifinals ====
January 23
12:30 pm

Report

Meralco Bolts 3x3	21–15	Blackwater Smooth Razor

Ayala Malls Circuit

January 23
12:55 pm

Report

TNT Triple Giga	22–18	MCFASolver Tech Centrale

Ayala Malls Circuit

==== Third place game ====
January 23
1:25 pm

Report

Blackwater Smooth Razor	21–18	MCFASolver Tech Centrale

Ayala Malls Circuit

==== Finals ====
January 23
1:50 pm

Report

Meralco Bolts 3x3	21–13	TNT Triple Giga

Ayala Malls Circuit

=== Final standings ===
Pos	Team	Pld	W	L	PCT	AVG	PF	Tour points
1	Meralco Bolts 3x3	5	5	0	1.000	21.2	106	100
2	TNT Triple Giga	6	5	1	.833	18.8	113	80
3	Blackwater Smooth Razor	6	4	2	.667	17.7	106	70
4	MCFASolver Tech Centrale	6	3	3	.500	19.2	15	60
Eliminated at the quarterfinals
5	San Miguel Beermen	4	2	2	.500	16.8	67	50
6	Cavitex Braves	3	1	2	.333	17.0	51	45
7	NorthPort Batang Pier	4	1	3	.250	15.3	61	40
8	Purefoods TJ Titans	4	1	3	.250	14.8	59	35
Eliminated at the preliminary round
9	Barangay Ginebra San Miguel	3	1	2	.333	17.7	53	20
10	Terrafirma 3x3	2	0	2	.000	14.5	29	18
11	Pioneer ElastoSeal Katibays	3	0	3	.000	13.7	41	16

Source: PBA 3x3

== 5th leg ==
=== Groupings ===
Pool A	Pool B	Pool C
Meralco Bolts 3x3 (1); Cavitex Braves (6); NorthPort Batang Pier (7)	TNT Tropang Giga (2); San Miguel Beermen (5); Purefoods TJ Titans (8); Pioneer ElastoSeal Katibays (11)	Blackwater Smooth Razor (3); MCFASolver Tech Centrale (4); Barangay Ginebra San Miguel (9); Terrafirma 3x3 (10)

=== Preliminary round ===
==== Pool A ====
Pos	Team	Pld	W	L	PF	PA	PD	PCT	Qualification
1	Meralco Bolts 3x3	2	2	0	38	24	+14	1.000	Quarterfinals
2	Cavitex Braves	2	1	1	36	28	+8	.500	Quarterfinals
3	NorthPort Batang Pier	2	0	2	20	42	−22	.000	

Source: PBA 3x3
Rules for classification: 1) Wins; Win ratio if unequal number of games; 2) Head-to-head record; 3) Average points per game; 4) Higher seed.

January 29
10:50 am

Report

Meralco Bolts 3x3	21–9	NorthPort Batang Pier

Ayala Malls Manila Bay

January 29
12:05 pm

Report

Cavitex Braves	21–11	NorthPort Batang Pier

Ayala Malls Manila Bay

January 29
1:20 pm

Report

Meralco Bolts 3x3	17–15	Cavitex Braves

Ayala Malls Manila Bay

==== Pool B ====
Pos	Team	Pld	W	L	PF	PA	PD	PCT	Qualification
1	TNT Triple Giga	3	2	1	62	53	+9	.667 (Note: TNT Triple Giga 1–0 San Miguel Beermen)	Quarterfinals
2	San Miguel Beermen	3	2	1	46	49	−3	.667	Quarterfinals
3	Pioneer ElastoSeal Katibays	3	1	2	57	58	−1	.333 (Note: Pioneer ElastoSeal Katibays 1–0 Purefoods TJ Titans)	Quarterfinals
4	Purefoods TJ Titans	3	1	2	51	56	−5	.333	

Source: PBA 3x3
Rules for classification: 1) Wins; Win ratio if unequal number of games; 2) Head-to-head record; 3) Average points per game; 4) Higher seed.
Notes:

January 29
10:00 am

Report

TNT Triple Giga	21–12	San Miguel Beermen

Ayala Malls Manila Bay

January 29
11:15 am

Report

Pioneer ElastoSeal Katibays	20–22	TNT Triple Giga

Ayala Malls Manila Bay

January 29
12:30 pm

Report

Pioneer ElastoSeal Katibays	21–18	Purefoods TJ Titans

Ayala Malls Manila Bay

January 29
1:45 pm

Report

Purefoods TJ Titans	21–19	TNT Triple Giga

Ayala Malls Manila Bay

January 29
2:35 pm

Report

San Miguel Beermen	18–16	Pioneer ElastoSeal Katibays

Ayala Malls Manila Bay

January 30
11:00 am

Report

San Miguel Beermen	16–12	Purefoods TJ Titans

Ayala Malls Manila Bay

==== Pool C ====
Pos	Team	Pld	W	L	PF	PA	PD	PCT	Qualification
1	Terrafirma 3x3	3	2	1	57	54	+3	.667 (Note: Terrafirma 3x3 1–0 MCFASolver Tech Centrale)	Quarterfinals
2	MCFASolver Tech Centrale	3	2	1	59	60	−1	.667	Quarterfinals
3	Barangay Ginebra San Miguel	3	1	2	56	58	−2	.333 (Note: Barangay Ginebra San Miguel 1–0 Blackwater Smooth Razor)	Quarterfinals
4	Blackwater Smooth Razor	3	1	2	56	56	0	.333	

Source: PBA 3x3
Rules for classification: 1) Wins; Win ratio if unequal number of games; 2) Head-to-head record; 3) Average points per game; 4) Higher seed.
Notes:

January 29
10:25 am

Report

Barangay Ginebra San Miguel	20–16	Blackwater Smooth Razor

Ayala Malls Manila Bay

January 29
11:40 am

Report

MCFASolver Tech Centrale	21–20	Barangay Ginebra San Miguel

Ayala Malls Manila Bay

January 29
12:55 pm

Report

Blackwater Smooth Razor	21–15	Terrafirma 3x3

Ayala Malls Manila Bay

January 29
2:10 pm

Report

Terrafirma 3x3	21–16	Barangay Ginebra San Miguel

Ayala Malls Manila Bay

January 29
3:00 pm

Report

Blackwater Smooth Razor	19–21	MCFASolver Tech Centrale

Ayala Malls Manila Bay

January 30
11:25 am

Report

MCFASolver Tech Centrale	17–21	Terrafirma 3x3

Ayala Malls Manila Bay

=== Knockout stage ===
TNT Triple Giga defeated Meralco Bolts 3x3 in the finals, 21–18, to become the fifth leg winners.

==== Bracket ====
Quarterfinals
A1	Meralco Bolts 3x3	21
B3	Pioneer ElastoSeal Katibays	15
C2	MCFASolver Tech Centrale	19
B2	San Miguel Beermen	13
B1	TNT Triple Giga	21
C3	Barangay Ginebra San Miguel	15
C1	Terrafirma 3x3	15
A2	Cavitex Braves	21

Semifinals
A1	Meralco Bolts 3x3	17
C2	MCFASolver Tech Centrale	14
B1	TNT Triple Giga	21
A2	Cavitex Braves	16

Finals
A1	Meralco Bolts 3x3	18
B1	TNT Triple Giga	21
Third place
C2	MCFASolver Tech Centrale	13
A2	Cavitex Braves	21

==== Quarterfinals ====
January 30
11:50 am

Report

Meralco Bolts 3x3	21–15	Pioneer ElastoSeal Katibays

Ayala Malls Manila Bay

January 30
12:15 pm

Report

MCFASolver Tech Centrale	19–13	San Miguel Beermen

Ayala Malls Manila Bay

January 30
12:40 pm

Report

TNT Triple Giga	21–15	Barangay Ginebra San Miguel

Ayala Malls Manila Bay

January 30
1:05 pm

Report

Terrafirma 3x3	15–21	Cavitex Braves

Ayala Malls Manila Bay

==== Semifinals ====
January 30
1:30 pm

Report

Meralco Bolts 3x3	17–14	MCFASolver Tech Centrale

Ayala Malls Manila Bay

January 30
1:55 pm

Report

TNT Triple Giga	21–16	Cavitex Braves

Ayala Malls Manila Bay

==== Third place game ====
January 30
2:40 pm

Report

MCFASolver Tech Centrale	13–21	Cavitex Braves

Ayala Malls Manila Bay

==== Finals ====
January 30
3:05 pm

Report

Meralco Bolts 3x3	18–21	TNT Triple Giga

Ayala Malls Manila Bay

=== Final standings ===
Pos	Team	Pld	W	L	PCT	AVG	PF	Tour points
1	TNT Triple Giga	6	5	1	.833	20.8	125	100
2	Meralco Bolts 3x3	5	4	1	.800	18.8	94	80
3	Cavitex Braves	5	3	2	.600	18.8	94	70
4	MCFASolver Tech Centrale	6	3	3	.500	17.5	105	60
Eliminated at the quarterfinals
5	Terrafirma 3x3	4	2	2	.500	18.0	72	50
6	San Miguel Beermen	4	2	2	.500	14.8	59	45
7	Pioneer ElastoSeal Katibays	4	1	3	.250	18.0	72	40
8	Barangay Ginebra San Miguel	4	1	3	.250	17.8	71	35
Eliminated at the preliminary round
9	Blackwater Smooth Razor	3	1	2	.333	18.7	56	20
10	Purefoods TJ Titans	3	1	2	.333	17.0	51	18
11	NorthPort Batang Pier	2	0	2	.000	10.0	20	16

Source: PBA 3x3

== 6th leg ==
=== Groupings ===
Pool A	Pool B	Pool C
TNT Tropang Giga (1); San Miguel Beermen (6); Pioneer ElastoSeal Katibays (7)	Meralco Bolts 3x3 (2); Terrafirma 3x3 (5); Barangay Ginebra San Miguel (8); NorthPort Batang Pier (11)	Cavitex Braves (3); MCFASolver Tech Centrale (4); Blackwater Smooth Razor (9); Purefoods TJ Titans (10)

=== Preliminary round ===
==== Pool A ====
Pos	Team	Pld	W	L	PF	PA	PD	PCT	Qualification
1	TNT Triple Giga	2	2	0	42	29	+13	1.000	Quarterfinals
2	Pioneer ElastoSeal Katibays	2	1	1	38	40	−2	.500	Quarterfinals
3	San Miguel Beermen	2	0	2	31	42	−11	.000	

Source: PBA 3x3
Rules for classification: 1) Wins; Win ratio if unequal number of games; 2) Head-to-head record; 3) Average points per game; 4) Higher seed.

February 5
3:20 pm

Report

TNT Triple Giga	21–17	Pioneer ElastoSeal Katibays

Market! Market!

February 5
4:35 pm

Report

San Miguel Beermen	19–21	Pioneer ElastoSeal Katibays

Market! Market!

February 5
5:50 pm

Report

TNT Triple Giga	21–12	San Miguel Beermen

Market! Market!

==== Pool B ====
Pos	Team	Pld	W	L	PF	PA	PD	PCT	Qualification
1	Meralco Bolts 3x3	3	3	0	64	43	+21	1.000	Quarterfinals
2	Barangay Ginebra San Miguel	3	1	2	58	54	+4	.333	Quarterfinals
3	Terrafirma 3x3	3	1	2	54	59	−5	.333	Quarterfinals
4	NorthPort Batang Pier	3	1	2	39	59	−20	.333	

Source: PBA 3x3
Rules for classification: 1) Wins; Win ratio if unequal number of games; 2) Head-to-head record; 3) Average points per game; 4) Higher seed.

February 5
2:30 pm

Report

Meralco Bolts 3x3	21–17	Terrafirma 3x3

Market! Market!

February 5
3:45 pm

Report

NorthPort Batang Pier	9–22	Meralco Bolts 3x3

Market! Market!

February 5
5:00 pm

Report

NorthPort Batang Pier	12–21	Barangay Ginebra San Miguel

Market! Market!

February 5
6:15 pm

Report

Barangay Ginebra San Miguel	17–21	Meralco Bolts 3x3

Market! Market!

February 5
7:05 pm

Report

Terrafirma 3x3	16–18	NorthPort Batang Pier

Market! Market!

February 6
3:00 pm

Report

Terrafirma 3x3	21–20	Barangay Ginebra San Miguel

Market! Market!

==== Pool C ====
Pos	Team	Pld	W	L	PF	PA	PD	PCT	Qualification
1	Blackwater Smooth Razor	3	3	0	60	49	+11	1.000	Quarterfinals
2	Cavitex Braves	3	1	2	52	57	−5	.333 (Note: Cavitex Braves 3rd seed, Purefoods TJ Titans 10th seed)	Quarterfinals
3	Purefoods TJ Titans	3	1	2	52	58	−6	.333	Quarterfinals
4	MCFASolver Tech Centrale	3	1	2	48	48	0	.333	

Source: PBA 3x3
Rules for classification: 1) Wins; Win ratio if unequal number of games; 2) Head-to-head record; 3) Average points per game; 4) Higher seed.
Notes:

February 5
2:55 pm

Report

Blackwater Smooth Razor	20–18	Cavitex Braves

Market! Market!

February 5
4:10 pm

Report

MCFASolver Tech Centrale	16–19	Blackwater Smooth Razor

Market! Market!

February 5
5:25 pm

Report

Cavitex Braves	22–20	Purefoods TJ Titans

Market! Market!

February 5
6:40 pm

Report

Purefoods TJ Titans	15–21	Blackwater Smooth Razor

Market! Market!

February 5
7:30 pm

Report

Cavitex Braves	12–17	MCFASolver Tech Centrale

Market! Market!

February 6
3:25 pm

Report

MCFASolver Tech Centrale	15–17	Purefoods TJ Titans

Market! Market!

=== Knockout stage ===
Cavitex Braves defeated Blackwater Smooth Razor in the finals, 20–18, to become the fifth leg winners.

==== Bracket ====
Quarterfinals
A1	TNT Triple Giga	21
B3	Terrafirma 3x3	19
C2	Cavitex Braves	21
B2	Barangay Ginebra San Miguel	17
B1	Meralco Bolts 3x3	20
C3	Purefoods TJ Titans	12
C1	Blackwater Smooth Razor	21
A2	Pioneer ElastoSeal Katibays	17

Semifinals
A1	TNT Triple Giga	16
C2	Cavitex Braves	18
B1	Meralco Bolts 3x3	20
C1	Blackwater Smooth Razor	21

Finals
C2	Cavitex Braves	20
C1	Blackwater Smooth Razor	18
Third place
A1	TNT Triple Giga	21
B1	Meralco Bolts 3x3	16

==== Quarterfinals ====
February 6
3:50 pm

Report

TNT Triple Giga	21–19	Terrafirma 3x3

Market! Market!

February 6
4:15 pm

Report

Cavitex Braves	21–17	Barangay Ginebra San Miguel

Market! Market!

February 6
4:40 pm

Report

Meralco Bolts 3x3	20–12	Purefoods TJ Titans

Market! Market!

February 6
5:05 pm

Report

Blackwater Smooth Razor	21–17	Pioneer ElastoSeal Katibays

Market! Market!

==== Semifinals ====
February 6
5:30 pm

Report

TNT Triple Giga	16–18	Cavitex Braves

Market! Market!

February 6
5:55 pm

Report

Meralco Bolts 3x3	20–21	Blackwater Smooth Razor

Market! Market!

==== Third place game ====
February 6
6:40 pm

Report

TNT Triple Giga	21–16	Meralco Bolts 3x3

Market! Market!

==== Finals ====
February 6
7:05 pm

Report

Cavitex Braves	20–18	Blackwater Smooth Razor

Market! Market!

=== Final standings ===
Pos	Team	Pld	W	L	PCT	AVG	PF	Tour points
1	Cavitex Braves	6	4	2	.667	18.5	111	100
2	Blackwater Smooth Razor	6	5	1	.833	20.0	120	80
3	TNT Triple Giga	5	4	1	.800	20.0	100	70
4	Meralco Bolts 3x3	6	4	2	.667	20.0	120	60
Eliminated at the quarterfinals
5	Pioneer ElastoSeal Katibays	3	1	2	.333	18.3	55	50
6	Barangay Ginebra San Miguel	4	1	3	.250	18.8	75	45
7	Terrafirma 3x3	4	1	3	.250	18.3	73	40
8	Purefoods TJ Titans	4	1	3	.250	16.0	64	35
Eliminated at the preliminary round
9	MCFASolver Tech Centrale	3	1	2	.333	16.0	48	20
10	NorthPort Batang Pier	3	1	2	.333	13.0	39	18
11	San Miguel Beermen	2	0	2	.000	15.5	31	16

Source: PBA 3x3

== Legs summary ==
Pos	Team	1st leg	2nd leg	3rd leg	4th leg	5th leg	6th leg	Pts	Qualification
1	Meralco Bolts 3x3	1st	5th	1st	1st	2nd	4th	490	Qualification to Grand Finals quarterfinal round
2	TNT Triple Giga	7th	7th	2nd	2nd	1st	3rd	410	Qualification to Grand Finals quarterfinal round
3	Cavitex Braves	3rd	3rd	6th	6th	3rd	1st	400	Qualification to Grand Finals quarterfinal round
4	MCFASolver Tech Centrale	2nd	1st	3rd	4th	4th	9th	390	Qualification to Grand Finals quarterfinal round
5	Blackwater Smooth Razor	5th	4th	11th	3rd	9th	2nd	296	Qualification to Grand Finals preliminary round
6	San Miguel Beermen	11th	2nd	4th	5th	6th	11th	267	Qualification to Grand Finals preliminary round
7	Purefoods TJ Titans	4th	6th	10th	8th	10th	8th	211	Qualification to Grand Finals preliminary round
8	Pioneer ElastoSeal Katibays	8th	10th	5th	11th	7th	5th	209	Qualification to Grand Finals preliminary round
9	Terrafirma 3x3	9th	8th	7th	10th	5th	7th	203	Qualification to Grand Finals preliminary round
10	Barangay Ginebra San Miguel	6th	11th	9th	9th	8th	6th	181	Qualification to Grand Finals preliminary round
11	NorthPort Batang Pier	10th	9th	8th	7th	11th	10th	147	

Source: PBA 3x3 Report

== Grand Finals ==
=== Preliminary round ===
==== Pool A ====
Pos	Team	Pld	W	L	PF	PA	PD	PCT	Qualification
1	Blackwater Smooth Razor	2	2	0	41	33	+8	1.000	Quarterfinals
2	Pioneer ElastoSeal Katibays	2	1	1	39	31	+8	.500	Quarterfinals
3	Terrafirma 3x3	2	0	2	27	43	−16	.000	

Source: PBA 3x3
Rules for classification: 1) Wins; Win ratio if unequal number of games; 2) Head-to-head record; 3) Average points per game; 4) Higher seed.

February 19
2:00 pm

Report

Blackwater Smooth Razor	22–15	Terrafirma 3x3

Glorietta

February 19
2:50 pm

Report

Pioneer ElastoSeal Katibays	21–12	Terrafirma 3x3

Glorietta

February 19
3:40 pm

Report

Blackwater Smooth Razor	19–18	Pioneer ElastoSeal Katibays

Glorietta

==== Pool B ====
Pos	Team	Pld	W	L	PF	PA	PD	PCT	Qualification
1	Purefoods TJ Titans	2	1	1	39	39	0	.500	Quarterfinals
2	Barangay Ginebra San Miguel	2	1	1	38	34	+4	.500	Quarterfinals
3	San Miguel Beermen	2	1	1	35	39	−4	.500	

Source: PBA 3x3
Rules for classification: 1) Wins; Win ratio if unequal number of games; 2) Head-to-head record; 3) Average points per game; 4) Higher seed.

February 19
2:25 pm

Report

San Miguel Beermen	13–21	Barangay Ginebra San Miguel

Glorietta

February 19
3:15 pm

Report

Purefoods TJ Titans	21–17	Barangay Ginebra San Miguel

Glorietta

February 19
4:05 pm

Report

San Miguel Beermen	22–18	Purefoods TJ Titans

Glorietta

=== Knockout stage ===
==== Bracket ====
Seed refers to the position of the team after six legs. Letter and number inside parentheses denotes the pool letter and pool position of the team, respectively, after the preliminary round of the Grand Finals.

Quarterfinals
3	Meralco Bolts 3x3	22
10 (B1)	Barangay Ginebra San Miguel	10
5 (A1)	Blackwater Smooth Razor	21
4	MCFASolver Tech Centrale	20
1	Cavitex Braves	21
7 (B2)	Purefoods TJ Titans	17
8 (A2)	Pioneer ElastoSeal Katibays	14
2	TNT Triple Giga	21

Semifinals
3	Meralco Bolts 3x3	21
5 (A1)	Blackwater Smooth Razor	20
1	Cavitex Braves	17
2	TNT Triple Giga	19

Finals
3	Meralco Bolts 3x3	21
2	TNT Triple Giga	17
Third place
5 (A1)	Blackwater Smooth Razor	19
1	Cavitex Braves	22

==== Quarterfinals ====
February 19
4:30 pm

Report

Blackwater Smooth Razor	21–20	MCFASolver Tech Centrale

Glorietta

February 19
4:55 pm

Report

Meralco Bolts 3x3	22–10	Barangay Ginebra San Miguel

Glorietta

February 19
5:20 pm

Report

Pioneer ElastoSeal Katibays	14–21	TNT Triple Giga

Glorietta

February 19
5:45 pm

Report

Cavitex Braves	21–17	Purefoods TJ Titans

Glorietta

==== Semifinals ====
February 19
6:10 pm

Report

Meralco Bolts 3x3	21–20	Blackwater Smooth Razor

Glorietta

February 19
6:35 pm

Report

Cavitex Braves	17–19	TNT Triple Giga

Glorietta

==== Third place game ====
February 19
7:20 pm

Report

Blackwater Smooth Razor	19–22	Cavitex Braves

Glorietta

==== Finals ====
February 19
7:45 pm

Report

Meralco Bolts 3x3	21–17	TNT Triple Giga

Glorietta

== See also ==
- 2024 PBA 3x3 Women's Invitational
