= 2022–23 PBA 3x3 season – Third conference =

Third conference of the 2022–23 PBA 3x3 season

The third conference of the 2022–23 PBA 3x3 season started on January 14 and ended on February 26, 2023. It consisted of six two-day legs and a grand final. TNT Tropang Giga defeated San Miguel Beermen in the Grand Finals, 21–18, to become the conference's Grand Champion and to complete the first ever PBA 3x3 Grand Slam.

== Teams ==
The players listed have played in at least one of the legs.

Team	Players					
Barangay Ginebra San Miguel	Kim Aurin	Ralph Cu	Donald Gumaru	Ralph Salcedo	Nichole Ubalde	
Blackwater Bossing Red President	Hubert Cani	Jeff Javillonar	Prince Rivero	Ricci Rivero	Maclean Sabellina	Alfrancis Tamsi
Cavitex Braves	Dominick Fajardo	Bong Galanza	Marion Magat	Jorey Napoles	Tzaddy Rangel	Chester Saldua
J&T Express	Keith Datu	Marvin Hayes	Robin Roño	Joseph Sedurifa	Jeric Teng	
Meralco Bolts 3x3	Alfred Batino	Reymar Caduyac	Jeff Manday	Joseph Manlangit	Bryan Santos	
NorthPort Batang Pier	John Apacible	Wilson Baltazar	Gwyne Capacio	Patrick Jamison	Jan Sobrevega	Dexter Zamora
Pioneer ElastoSeal Katibays	Gian Abrigo	Kenneth Mocon	Reggie Morido	Reeve Ugsang	Dennice Villamor	
Platinum Karaoke	Yutien Andrada	Raphael Banal	Brandon Bates	Nico Salva	Yves Sazon	Terrence Tumalip
Purefoods TJ Titans	Christian Buñag	Mikey Cabahug	Ronnie de Leon	Joseph Eriobu	Martin Gozum	Christian Rivera
San Miguel Beermen	Dariel Bayla	Ken Bono	Wendell Comboy	Leo de Vera	Tonino Gonzaga	James Mangahas
Terrafirma 3x3	Shaq Alanes	Red Cachuela	Enrique Caunan	Sandy Ceñal	Jomari Lacastesantos	Jeremiah Taladua
TNT Tropang Giga	Samboy de Leon	Chris Exciminiano	Lervin Flores	Gryann Mendoza	Luis Villegas	Almond Vosotros

== 1st leg ==
=== Groupings ===
Pool A	Pool B	Pool C	Pool D
TNT Tropang Giga; Pioneer ElastoSeal Katibays; Blackwater Bossing Red President	Cavitex Braves; San Miguel Beermen; NorthPort Batang Pier	J&T Express; Barangay Ginebra San Miguel; Terrafirma 3x3	Platinum Karaoke; Meralco Bolts 3x3 Purefoods TJ Titans

=== Preliminary round ===
==== Pool A ====
Pos	Team	Pld	W	L	PF	PA	PD	PCT	Qualification
1	TNT Tropang Giga	2	1	1	37	27	+10	.500	Quarterfinals
2	Pioneer ElastoSeal Katibays	2	1	1	35	36	−1	.500	Quarterfinals
3	Blackwater Bossing Red President	2	1	1	29	38	−9	.500	9th–12th classification

Source: PBA 3x3
Rules for classification: 1) Wins; Win ratio if unequal number of games; 2) Head-to-head record; 3) Average points per game; 4) Higher seed.

January 14
11:00 am

Report

Pioneer ElastoSeal Katibays	17–20	Blackwater Bossing Red President

Robinsons Novaliches

January 14
12:40 pm

Report

TNT Tropang Giga	16–18	Pioneer ElastoSeal Katibays

Robinsons Novaliches

January 14
2:20 pm

Report

Blackwater Bossing Red President	9–21	TNT Tropang Giga

Robinsons Novaliches

==== Pool B ====
Pos	Team	Pld	W	L	PF	PA	PD	PCT	Qualification
1	Cavitex Braves	2	2	0	43	21	+22	1.000	Quarterfinals
2	San Miguel Beermen	2	1	1	39	35	+4	.500	Quarterfinals
3	NorthPort Batang Pier	2	0	2	16	42	−26	.000	9th–12th classification

Source: PBA 3x3
Rules for classification: 1) Wins; Win ratio if unequal number of games; 2) Head-to-head record; 3) Average points per game; 4) Higher seed.

January 14
11:25 am

Report

Cavitex Braves	22–18	San Miguel Beermen

Robinsons Novaliches

January 14
1:05 pm

Report

San Miguel Beermen	21–13	NorthPort Batang Pier

Robinsons Novaliches

January 14
2:45 pm

Report

NorthPort Batang Pier	3–21	Cavitex Braves

Robinsons Novaliches

==== Pool C ====
Pos	Team	Pld	W	L	PF	PA	PD	PCT	Qualification
1	Barangay Ginebra San Miguel	2	2	0	40	29	+11	1.000	Quarterfinals
2	J&T Express	2	1	1	39	35	+4	.500	Quarterfinals
3	Terrafirma 3x3	2	0	2	27	42	−15	.000	9th–12th classification

Source: PBA 3x3
Rules for classification: 1) Wins; Win ratio if unequal number of games; 2) Head-to-head record; 3) Average points per game; 4) Higher seed.

January 14
11:50 am

Report

Terrafirma 3x3	16–21	J&T Express

Robinsons Novaliches

January 14
1:30 pm

Report

J&T Express	18–19	Barangay Ginebra San Miguel

Robinsons Novaliches

January 14
3:10 pm

Report

Barangay Ginebra San Miguel	21–11	Terrafirma 3x3

Robinsons Novaliches

==== Pool D ====
Pos	Team	Pld	W	L	PF	PA	PD	PCT	Qualification
1	Purefoods TJ Titans	2	1	1	35	34	+1	.500	Quarterfinals
2	Meralco Bolts 3x3	2	1	1	33	35	−2	.500	Quarterfinals
3	Platinum Karaoke	2	1	1	32	31	+1	.500	9th–12th classification

Source: PBA 3x3
Rules for classification: 1) Wins; Win ratio if unequal number of games; 2) Head-to-head record; 3) Average points per game; 4) Higher seed.

January 14
12:15 pm

Report

Platinum Karaoke	15–17	Purefoods TJ Titans

Robinsons Novaliches

January 14
1:55 pm

Report

Purefoods TJ Titans	18–19	Meralco Bolts 3x3

Robinsons Novaliches

January 14
3:35 pm

Report

Meralco Bolts 3x3	14–17	Platinum Karaoke

Robinsons Novaliches

=== Classification 9th–12th ===
January 15
11:00 am

Report

Blackwater Bossing Red President	21–12	Terrafirma 3x3

Robinsons Novaliches

January 15
1:55 pm

Report

NorthPort Batang Pier	17–21	Platinum Karaoke

Robinsons Novaliches

=== Knockout stage ===
San Miguel Beermen defeated Pioneer ElastoSeal Katibays in the finals, 21–17, to become the first leg winners.

==== Bracket ====
Quarterfinals
A1	TNT Tropang Giga	21
C2	J&T Express	12
D1	Purefoods TJ Titans	12
B2	San Miguel Beermen	21
B1	Cavitex Braves	15
D2	Meralco Bolts 3x3	10
C1	Barangay Ginebra San Miguel	16
A2	Pioneer ElastoSeal Katibays	18

Semifinals
A1	TNT Tropang Giga	17
B2	San Miguel Beermen	21
B1	Cavitex Braves	16
A2	Pioneer ElastoSeal Katibays	18

Finals
B2	San Miguel Beermen	21
A2	Pioneer ElastoSeal Katibays	17
Third place
A1	TNT Tropang Giga	14
B1	Cavitex Braves	16

==== Quarterfinals ====
January 15
11:25 am

Report

TNT Tropang Giga	21–12	J&T Express

Robinsons Novaliches

January 15
11:50 am

Report

Purefoods TJ Titans	12–21	San Miguel Beermen

Robinsons Novaliches

January 15
12:15 pm

Report

Cavitex Braves	15–10	Meralco Bolts 3x3

Robinsons Novaliches

January 15
12:40 pm

Report

Barangay Ginebra San Miguel	16–18	Pioneer ElastoSeal Katibays

Robinsons Novaliches

==== Semifinals ====
January 15
1:05 pm

Report

TNT Tropang Giga	17–21	San Miguel Beermen

Robinsons Novaliches

January 15
1:30 pm

Report

Cavitex Braves	16–18	Pioneer ElastoSeal Katibays

Robinsons Novaliches

==== Third place game ====
January 15
2:35 pm

Report

TNT Tropang Giga	14–16	Cavitex Braves

Robinsons Novaliches

==== Finals ====
January 15
3:00 pm

Report

San Miguel Beermen	21–17	Pioneer ElastoSeal Katibays

Robinsons Novaliches

=== Final standings ===
Pos	Team	Pld	W	L	PCT	AVG	PF	Tour points
1	San Miguel Beermen	5	4	1	.800	20.4	102	100
2	Pioneer ElastoSeal Katibays	5	3	2	.600	17.6	88	80
3	Cavitex Braves	5	4	1	.800	18.0	90	70
4	TNT Tropang Giga	5	2	3	.400	17.8	89	60
Eliminated at the quarterfinals
5	Barangay Ginebra San Miguel	3	2	1	.667	18.7	56	50
6	J&T Express	3	1	2	.333	17.0	51	45
7	Purefoods TJ Titans	3	1	2	.333	15.7	47	40
8	Meralco Bolts 3x3	3	1	2	.333	14.3	43	35
Winners of 9th–12th classification games
9	Platinum Karaoke	3	2	1	.600	17.7	53	20
10	Blackwater Bossing Red President	3	2	1	.667	16.7	50	18
Losers of 9th–12th classification games
11	Terrafirma 3x3	3	0	3	.000	13.0	39	16
12	NorthPort Batang Pier	3	0	3	.000	11.0	33	14

Source: PBA 3x3

== 2nd leg ==
=== Groupings ===
Pool A	Pool B	Pool C	Pool D
San Miguel Beermen (1); Meralco Bolts 3x3 (8); Platinum Karaoke (9)	Pioneer ElastoSeal Katibays (2); Purefoods TJ Titans (7); Blackwater Bossing Red President (10)	Cavitex Braves (3); J&T Express (6); Terrafirma 3x3 (11)	TNT Tropang Giga (4); Barangay Ginebra San Miguel (5); NorthPort Batang Pier (12)

=== Preliminary round ===
==== Pool A ====
Pos	Team	Pld	W	L	PF	PA	PD	PCT	Qualification
1	San Miguel Beermen	2	2	0	43	34	+9	1.000	Quarterfinals
2	Meralco Bolts 3x3	2	1	1	37	35	+2	.500	Quarterfinals
3	Platinum Karaoke	2	0	2	30	41	−11	.000	9th–12th classification

Source: PBA 3x3
Rules for classification: 1) Wins; Win ratio if unequal number of games; 2) Head-to-head record; 3) Average points per game; 4) Higher seed.

January 19
11:00 am

Report

San Miguel Beermen	22–16	Platinum Karaoke

Robinsons Place Antipolo

January 19
12:40 pm

Report

Meralco Bolts 3x3	18–21	San Miguel Beermen

Robinsons Place Antipolo

January 19
2:20 pm

Report

Platinum Karaoke	14–19	Meralco Bolts 3x3

Robinsons Place Antipolo

==== Pool B ====
Pos	Team	Pld	W	L	PF	PA	PD	PCT	Qualification
1	Blackwater Bossing Red President	2	1	1	40	40	0	.500	Quarterfinals
2	Purefoods TJ Titans	2	1	1	39	35	+4	.500	Quarterfinals
3	Pioneer ElastoSeal Katibays	2	1	1	35	39	−4	.500	9th–12th classification

Source: PBA 3x3
Rules for classification: 1) Wins; Win ratio if unequal number of games; 2) Head-to-head record; 3) Average points per game; 4) Higher seed.

January 19
11:25 am

Report

Pioneer ElastoSeal Katibays	14–20	Purefoods TJ Titans

Robinsons Place Antipolo

January 19
1:05 pm

Report

Blackwater Bossing Red President	19–21	Pioneer ElastoSeal Katibays

Robinsons Place Antipolo

January 19
2:45 pm

Report

Purefoods TJ Titans	19–21	Blackwater Bossing Red President

Robinsons Place Antipolo

==== Pool C ====
Pos	Team	Pld	W	L	PF	PA	PD	PCT	Qualification
1	J&T Express	2	2	0	40	32	+8	1.000	Quarterfinals
2	Cavitex Braves	2	1	1	39	37	+2	.500	Quarterfinals
3	Terrafirma 3x3	2	0	2	32	42	−10	.000	9th–12th classification

Source: PBA 3x3
Rules for classification: 1) Wins; Win ratio if unequal number of games; 2) Head-to-head record; 3) Average points per game; 4) Higher seed.

January 19
11:50 am

Report

J&T Express	19–18	Cavitex Braves

Robinsons Place Antipolo

January 19
1:30 pm

Report

Terrafirma 3x3	14–21	J&T Express

Robinsons Place Antipolo

January 19
3:10 pm

Report

Cavitex Braves	21–18	Terrafirma 3x3

Robinsons Place Antipolo

==== Pool D ====
Pos	Team	Pld	W	L	PF	PA	PD	PCT	Qualification
1	Barangay Ginebra San Miguel	2	2	0	42	38	+4	1.000	Quarterfinals
2	TNT Tropang Giga	2	1	1	41	33	+8	.500	Quarterfinals
3	NorthPort Batang Pier	2	0	2	30	42	−12	.000	9th–12th classification

Source: PBA 3x3
Rules for classification: 1) Wins; Win ratio if unequal number of games; 2) Head-to-head record; 3) Average points per game; 4) Higher seed.

January 19
12:15 pm

Report

TNT Tropang Giga	20–21	Barangay Ginebra San Miguel

Robinsons Place Antipolo

January 19
1:55 pm

Report

NorthPort Batang Pier	12–21	TNT Tropang Giga

Robinsons Place Antipolo

January 19
3:35 pm

Report

Barangay Ginebra San Miguel	21–18	NorthPort Batang Pier

Robinsons Place Antipolo

=== Classification 9th–12th ===
January 20
11:00 am

Report

Platinum Karaoke	17–13	Terrafirma 3x3

Robinsons Place Antipolo

January 20
1:55 pm

Report

Pioneer ElastoSeal Katibays	19–17	NorthPort Batang Pier

Robinsons Place Antipolo

=== Knockout stage ===
TNT Tropang Giga defeated Barangay Ginebra San Miguel in the finals, 20–14, to become the second leg winners.

==== Bracket ====
Quarterfinals
A1	San Miguel Beermen	19
C2	Cavitex Braves	22
D1	Barangay Ginebra San Miguel	13
B2	Purefoods TJ Titans	11
B1	Blackwater Bossing Red President	13
D2	TNT Tropang Giga	21
C1	J&T Express	17
A2	Meralco Bolts 3x3	21

Semifinals
C2	Cavitex Braves	15
D1	Barangay Ginebra San Miguel	21
D2	TNT Tropang Giga	20
A2	Meralco Bolts 3x3	18

Finals
D1	Barangay Ginebra San Miguel	14
D2	TNT Tropang Giga	20
Third place
C2	Cavitex Braves	17
A2	Meralco Bolts 3x3	20

==== Quarterfinals ====
January 20
11:25 am

Report

San Miguel Beermen	19–22	Cavitex Braves

Robinsons Place Antipolo

January 20
11:50 am

Report

Barangay Ginebra San Miguel	13–11	Purefoods TJ Titans

Robinsons Place Antipolo

January 20
12:15 pm

Report

Blackwater Bossing Red President	13–21	TNT Tropang Giga

Robinsons Place Antipolo

January 20
12:40 pm

Report

J&T Express	17–21	Meralco Bolts 3x3

Robinsons Place Antipolo

==== Semifinals ====
January 20
1:05 pm

Report

Cavitex Braves	15–21	Barangay Ginebra San Miguel

Robinsons Place Antipolo

January 20
1:30 pm

Report

TNT Tropang Giga	20–18	Meralco Bolts 3x3

Robinsons Place Antipolo

==== Third place game ====
January 20
2:35 pm

Report

Cavitex Braves	17–20	Meralco Bolts 3x3

Robinsons Place Antipolo

==== Finals ====
January 20
3:00 pm

Report

Barangay Ginebra San Miguel	14–20	TNT Tropang Giga

Robinsons Place Antipolo

=== Final standings ===
Pos	Team	Pld	W	L	PCT	AVG	PF	Tour points
1	TNT Tropang Giga	5	4	1	.800	20.4	102	100
2	Barangay Ginebra San Miguel	5	4	1	.800	18.0	90	80
3	Meralco Bolts 3x3	5	3	2	.600	19.2	96	70
4	Cavitex Braves	5	2	3	.400	18.6	93	60
Eliminated at the quarterfinals
5	San Miguel Beermen	3	2	1	.667	20.7	62	50
6	J&T Express	3	2	1	.667	19.0	57	45
7	Blackwater Bossing Red President	3	1	2	.333	17.7	53	40
8	Purefoods TJ Titans	3	1	2	.333	16.7	50	35
Winners of 9th–12th classification games
9	Pioneer ElastoSeal Katibays	3	2	1	.667	18.0	54	20
10	Platinum Karaoke	3	1	2	.333	15.7	47	18
Losers of 9th–12th classification games
11	NorthPort Batang Pier	3	0	3	.000	15.7	47	16
12	Terrafirma 3x3	3	0	3	.000	15.0	45	14

Source: PBA 3x3

== 3rd leg ==
=== Groupings ===
Pool A	Pool B	Pool C	Pool D
TNT Tropang Giga (1); Purefoods TJ Titans (8); Pioneer ElastoSeal Katibays (9)	Barangay Ginebra San Miguel (2); Blackwater Bossing Red President (7); Platinum Karaoke (10)	Meralco Bolts 3x3 (3); J&T Express (6); NorthPort Batang Pier (11)	Cavitex Braves (4); San Miguel Beermen (5); Terrafirma 3x3 (12)

=== Preliminary round ===
==== Pool A ====
Pos	Team	Pld	W	L	PF	PA	PD	PCT	Qualification
1	TNT Tropang Giga	2	2	0	42	30	+12	1.000	Quarterfinals
2	Pioneer ElastoSeal Katibays	2	1	1	28	35	−7	.500	Quarterfinals
3	Purefoods TJ Titans	2	0	2	32	37	−5	.000	9th–12th classification

Source: PBA 3x3
Rules for classification: 1) Wins; Win ratio if unequal number of games; 2) Head-to-head record; 3) Average points per game; 4) Higher seed.

January 26
10:00 am

Report

Purefoods TJ Titans	14–16	Pioneer ElastoSeal Katibays

Robinsons Place Antipolo

January 26
11:40 am

Report

Pioneer ElastoSeal Katibays	12–21	TNT Tropang Giga

Robinsons Place Antipolo

January 26
1:20 pm

Report

TNT Tropang Giga	21–18	Purefoods TJ Titans

Robinsons Place Antipolo

==== Pool B ====
Pos	Team	Pld	W	L	PF	PA	PD	PCT	Qualification
1	Platinum Karaoke	2	2	0	34	30	+4	1.000	Quarterfinals
2	Barangay Ginebra San Miguel	2	1	1	35	35	0	.500	Quarterfinals
3	Blackwater Bossing Red President	2	0	2	35	39	−4	.000	9th–12th classification

Source: PBA 3x3
Rules for classification: 1) Wins; Win ratio if unequal number of games; 2) Head-to-head record; 3) Average points per game; 4) Higher seed.

January 26
10:25 am

Report

Platinum Karaoke	16–14	Barangay Ginebra San Miguel

Robinsons Place Antipolo

January 26
12:05 pm

Report

Blackwater Bossing Red President	16–18	Platinum Karaoke

Robinsons Place Antipolo

January 26
1:45 pm

Report

Barangay Ginebra San Miguel	21–19	Blackwater Bossing Red President

Robinsons Place Antipolo

==== Pool C ====
Pos	Team	Pld	W	L	PF	PA	PD	PCT	Qualification
1	J&T Express	2	2	0	37	33	+4	1.000	Quarterfinals
2	Meralco Bolts 3x3	2	1	1	36	26	+10	.500	Quarterfinals
3	NorthPort Batang Pier	2	0	2	27	41	−14	.000	9th–12th classification

Source: PBA 3x3
Rules for classification: 1) Wins; Win ratio if unequal number of games; 2) Head-to-head record; 3) Average points per game; 4) Higher seed.

January 26
10:50 am

Report

J&T Express	20–18	NorthPort Batang Pier

Robinsons Place Antipolo

January 26
12:30 pm

Report

NorthPort Batang Pier	9–21	Meralco Bolts 3x3

Robinsons Place Antipolo

January 26
2:10 pm

Report

Meralco Bolts 3x3	15–17	J&T Express

Robinsons Place Antipolo

==== Pool D ====
Pos	Team	Pld	W	L	PF	PA	PD	PCT	Qualification
1	Cavitex Braves	2	2	0	38	25	+13	1.000	Quarterfinals
2	Terrafirma 3x3	2	1	1	31	33	−2	.500	Quarterfinals
3	San Miguel Beermen	2	0	2	27	38	−11	.000	9th–12th classification

Source: PBA 3x3
Rules for classification: 1) Wins; Win ratio if unequal number of games; 2) Head-to-head record; 3) Average points per game; 4) Higher seed.

January 26
11:15 am

Report

Cavitex Braves	21–11	San Miguel Beermen

Robinsons Place Antipolo

January 26
12:55 pm

Report

San Miguel Beermen	16–17	Terrafirma 3x3

Robinsons Place Antipolo

January 26
2:35 pm

Report

Terrafirma 3x3	14–17	Cavitex Braves

Robinsons Place Antipolo

=== Classification 9th–12th ===
January 27
10:00 am

Report

Purefoods TJ Titans	22–14	NorthPort Batang Pier

Robinsons Place Antipolo

January 27
12:55 pm

Report

Blackwater Bossing Red President	19–17	San Miguel Beermen

Robinsons Place Antipolo

=== Knockout stage ===
Barangay Ginebra San Miguel defeated Platinum Karaoke in the finals, 20–19, to become the third leg winners.

==== Bracket ====
Quarterfinals
A1	TNT Tropang Giga	18
C2	Meralco Bolts 3x3	21
D1	Cavitex Braves	16
B2	Barangay Ginebra San Miguel	21
B1	Platinum Karaoke	20
D2	Terrafirma 3x3	16
C1	J&T Express	17
A2	Pioneer ElastoSeal Katibays	14

Semifinals
C2	Meralco Bolts 3x3	13
B2	Barangay Ginebra San Miguel	15
B1	Platinum Karaoke	19
C1	J&T Express	13

Finals
B2	Barangay Ginebra San Miguel	20
B1	Platinum Karaoke	19
Third place
C2	Meralco Bolts 3x3	19
C1	J&T Express	15

==== Quarterfinals ====
January 27
10:25 am

Report

TNT Tropang Giga	18–21	Meralco Bolts 3x3

Robinsons Place Antipolo

January 27
10:50 am

Report

Cavitex Braves	16–21	Barangay Ginebra San Miguel

Robinsons Place Antipolo

January 27
11:15 am

Report

Platinum Karaoke	20–16	Terrafirma 3x3

Robinsons Place Antipolo

January 27
11:40 am

Report

J&T Express	17–14	Pioneer ElastoSeal Katibays

Robinsons Place Antipolo

==== Semifinals ====
January 27
12:05 pm

Report

Meralco Bolts 3x3	13–15	Barangay Ginebra San Miguel

Robinsons Place Antipolo

January 27
12:30 pm

Report

Platinum Karaoke	19–13	J&T Express

Robinsons Place Antipolo

==== Third place game ====
January 27
1:35 pm

Report

Meralco Bolts 3x3	19–15	J&T Express

Robinsons Place Antipolo

==== Finals ====
January 27
2:00 pm

Report

Barangay Ginebra San Miguel	20–19	Platinum Karaoke

Robinsons Place Antipolo

=== Final standings ===
Pos	Team	Pld	W	L	PCT	AVG	PF	Tour points
1	Barangay Ginebra San Miguel	5	4	1	.800	18.2	91	100
2	Platinum Karaoke	5	4	1	.800	18.4	92	80
3	Meralco Bolts 3x3	5	3	2	.600	17.8	89	70
4	J&T Express	5	3	2	.600	16.4	82	60
Eliminated at the quarterfinals
5	TNT Tropang Giga	3	2	1	.667	20.0	60	50
6	Cavitex Braves	3	2	1	.667	18.0	54	45
7	Terrafirma 3x3	3	1	2	.333	15.7	47	40
8	Pioneer ElastoSeal Katibays	3	1	2	.333	14.0	42	35
Winners of 9th–12th classification games
9	Purefoods TJ Titans	3	1	2	.333	18.0	54	20
10	Blackwater Bossing Red President	3	1	2	.333	18.0	54	18
Losers of 9th–12th classification games
11	San Miguel Beermen	3	0	3	.000	14.7	44	16
12	NorthPort Batang Pier	3	0	3	.000	13.7	41	14

Source: PBA 3x3

== 4th leg ==
=== Groupings ===
Pool A	Pool B	Pool C	Pool D
Barangay Ginebra San Miguel (1); Pioneer ElastoSeal Katibays (8); Purefoods TJ Titans (9)	Platinum Karaoke (2); Terrafirma 3x3 (7); Blackwater Bossing Red President (10)	Meralco Bolts 3x3 (3); Cavitex Braves (6); San Miguel Beermen (11)	J&T Express (4); TNT Tropang Giga (5); NorthPort Batang Pier (12)

=== Preliminary round ===
==== Pool A ====
Pos	Team	Pld	W	L	PF	PA	PD	PCT	Qualification
1	Pioneer ElastoSeal Katibays	2	1	1	35	30	+5	.500	Quarterfinals
2	Barangay Ginebra San Miguel	2	1	1	34	38	−4	.500	Quarterfinals
3	Purefoods TJ Titans	2	1	1	33	34	−1	.500	9th–12th classification

Source: PBA 3x3
Rules for classification: 1) Wins; Win ratio if unequal number of games; 2) Head-to-head record; 3) Average points per game; 4) Higher seed.

February 4
11:00 am

Report

Pioneer ElastoSeal Katibays	14–16	Purefoods TJ Titans

Robinsons Novaliches

February 4
12:40 pm

Report

Purefoods TJ Titans	17–20	Barangay Ginebra San Miguel

Robinsons Novaliches

February 4
2:20 pm

Report

Barangay Ginebra San Miguel	14–21	Pioneer ElastoSeal Katibays

Robinsons Novaliches

==== Pool B ====
Pos	Team	Pld	W	L	PF	PA	PD	PCT	Qualification
1	Platinum Karaoke	2	2	0	41	24	+17	1.000	Quarterfinals
2	Blackwater Bossing Red President	2	1	1	36	40	−4	.500	Quarterfinals
3	Terrafirma 3x3	2	0	2	29	42	−13	.000	9th–12th classification

Source: PBA 3x3
Rules for classification: 1) Wins; Win ratio if unequal number of games; 2) Head-to-head record; 3) Average points per game; 4) Higher seed.

February 4
11:25 am

Report

Terrafirma 3x3	20–21	Blackwater Bossing Red President

Robinsons Novaliches

February 4
1:05 pm

Report

Platinum Karaoke	21–9	Terrafirma 3x3

Robinsons Novaliches

February 4
2:45 pm

Report

Blackwater Bossing Red President	15–20	Platinum Karaoke

Robinsons Novaliches

==== Pool C ====
Pos	Team	Pld	W	L	PF	PA	PD	PCT	Qualification
1	Cavitex Braves	2	1	1	39	40	−1	.500	Quarterfinals
2	Meralco Bolts 3x3	2	1	1	39	38	+1	.500	Quarterfinals
3	San Miguel Beermen	2	1	1	38	38	0	.500	9th–12th classification

Source: PBA 3x3
Rules for classification: 1) Wins; Win ratio if unequal number of games; 2) Head-to-head record; 3) Average points per game; 4) Higher seed.

February 4
11:50 am

Report

San Miguel Beermen	19–20	Cavitex Braves

Robinsons Novaliches

February 4
1:30 pm

Report

Meralco Bolts 3x3	18–19	San Miguel Beermen

Robinsons Novaliches

February 4
3:10 pm

Report

Cavitex Braves	19–21	Meralco Bolts 3x3

Robinsons Novaliches

==== Pool D ====
Pos	Team	Pld	W	L	PF	PA	PD	PCT	Qualification
1	TNT Tropang Giga	2	2	0	44	32	+12	1.000	Quarterfinals
2	J&T Express	2	1	1	34	38	−4	.500	Quarterfinals
3	NorthPort Batang Pier	2	0	2	31	39	−8	.000	9th–12th classification

Source: PBA 3x3
Rules for classification: 1) Wins; Win ratio if unequal number of games; 2) Head-to-head record; 3) Average points per game; 4) Higher seed.

February 4
12:15 pm

Report

NorthPort Batang Pier	15–22	TNT Tropang Giga

Robinsons Novaliches

February 4
1:55 pm

Report

TNT Tropang Giga	22–17	J&T Express

Robinsons Novaliches

February 4
3:35 pm

Report

J&T Express	17–16	NorthPort Batang Pier

Robinsons Novaliches

=== Classification 9th–12th ===
February 5
11:00 am

Report

Purefoods TJ Titans	21–20	San Miguel Beermen

Robinsons Novaliches

February 5
1:55 pm

Report

Terrafirma 3x3	18–19	NorthPort Batang Pier

Robinsons Novaliches

=== Knockout stage ===
Cavitex Braves defeated Pioneer ElastoSeal Katibays in the finals, 19–15, to become the fourth leg winners.

==== Bracket ====
Quarterfinals
A1	Pioneer ElastoSeal Katibays	15
C2	Meralco Bolts 3x3	11
D1	TNT Tropang Giga	21
B2	Blackwater Bossing Red President	13
B1	Platinum Karaoke	17
D2	J&T Express	11
C1	Cavitex Braves	18
A2	Barangay Ginebra San Miguel	13

Semifinals
A1	Pioneer ElastoSeal Katibays	22
D1	TNT Tropang Giga	20
B1	Platinum Karaoke	12
C1	Cavitex Braves	22

Finals
A1	Pioneer ElastoSeal Katibays	15
C1	Cavitex Braves	19
Third place
D1	TNT Tropang Giga	20
B1	Platinum Karaoke	18

==== Quarterfinals ====
February 5
11:25 am

Report

Pioneer ElastoSeal Katibays	15–11	Meralco Bolts 3x3

Robinsons Novaliches

February 5
11:50 am

Report

TNT Tropang Giga	21–13	Blackwater Bossing Red President

Robinsons Novaliches

February 5
12:15 pm

Report

Platinum Karaoke	17–11	J&T Express

Robinsons Novaliches

February 5
12:40 pm

Report

Cavitex Braves	18–13	Barangay Ginebra San Miguel

Robinsons Novaliches

==== Semifinals ====
February 5
1:05 pm

Report

Pioneer ElastoSeal Katibays	22–20	TNT Tropang Giga

Robinsons Novaliches

February 5
1:30 pm

Report

Platinum Karaoke	12–22	Cavitex Braves

Robinsons Novaliches

==== Third place game ====
February 5
2:35 pm

Report

TNT Tropang Giga	20–18	Platinum Karaoke

Robinsons Novaliches

==== Finals ====
February 5
3:00 pm

Report

Pioneer ElastoSeal Katibays	15–19	Cavitex Braves

Robinsons Novaliches

=== Final standings ===
Pos	Team	Pld	W	L	PCT	AVG	PF	Tour points
1	Cavitex Braves	5	4	1	.800	19.6	98	100
2	Pioneer ElastoSeal Katibays	5	3	2	.600	17.4	87	80
3	TNT Tropang Giga	5	4	1	.800	21.0	105	70
4	Platinum Karaoke	5	3	2	.600	17.6	88	60
Eliminated at the quarterfinals
5	Meralco Bolts 3x3	3	1	2	.333	16.7	50	50
6	Blackwater Bossing Red President	3	1	2	.333	16.3	49	45
7	Barangay Ginebra San Miguel	3	1	2	.333	15.7	47	40
8	J&T Express	3	1	2	.333	15.0	45	35
Winners of 9th–12th classification games
9	Purefoods TJ Titans	3	2	1	.667	18.0	54	20
10	San Miguel Beermen	3	1	2	.333	19.3	58	18
Losers of 9th–12th classification games
11	NorthPort Batang Pier	3	1	2	.333	16.7	50	16
12	Terrafirma 3x3	3	0	3	.000	15.7	47	14

Source: PBA 3x3

== 5th leg ==
=== Groupings ===
Pool A	Pool B	Pool C	Pool D
Cavitex Braves (1); J&T Express (8); Purefoods TJ Titans (9)	Pioneer ElastoSeal Katibays (2); Barangay Ginebra San Miguel (7); San Miguel Beermen (10)	TNT Tropang Giga (3); Blackwater Bossing Red President (6); NorthPort Batang Pier (11)	Platinum Karaoke (4); Meralco Bolts 3x3 (5); Terrafirma 3x3 (12)

=== Preliminary round ===
==== Pool A ====
Pos	Team	Pld	W	L	PF	PA	PD	PCT	Qualification
1	Cavitex Braves	2	2	0	43	37	+6	1.000	Quarterfinals
2	Purefoods TJ Titans	2	1	1	36	36	0	.500	Quarterfinals
3	J&T Express	2	0	2	35	41	−6	.000	9th–12th classification

Source: PBA 3x3
Rules for classification: 1) Wins; Win ratio if unequal number of games; 2) Head-to-head record; 3) Average points per game; 4) Higher seed.

February 11
11:00 am

Report

Purefoods TJ Titans	17–21	Cavitex Braves

Robinsons Las Piñas

February 11
12:40 pm

Report

J&T Express	15–19	Purefoods TJ Titans

Robinsons Las Piñas

February 11
2:20 pm

Report

Cavitex Braves	22–20	J&T Express

Robinsons Las Piñas

==== Pool B ====
Pos	Team	Pld	W	L	PF	PA	PD	PCT	Qualification
1	San Miguel Beermen	2	2	0	42	27	+15	1.000	Quarterfinals
2	Barangay Ginebra San Miguel	2	1	1	39	35	+4	.500	Quarterfinals
3	Pioneer ElastoSeal Katibays	2	0	2	23	42	−19	.000	9th–12th classification

Source: PBA 3x3
Rules for classification: 1) Wins; Win ratio if unequal number of games; 2) Head-to-head record; 3) Average points per game; 4) Higher seed.

February 11
11:25 am

Report

San Miguel Beermen	21–9	Pioneer ElastoSeal Katibays

Robinsons Las Piñas

February 11
1:05 pm

Report

Barangay Ginebra San Miguel	18–21	San Miguel Beermen

Robinsons Las Piñas

February 11
2:45 pm

Report

Pioneer ElastoSeal Katibays	14–21	Barangay Ginebra San Miguel

Robinsons Las Piñas

==== Pool C ====
Pos	Team	Pld	W	L	PF	PA	PD	PCT	Qualification
1	TNT Tropang Giga	2	2	0	42	20	+22	1.000	Quarterfinals
2	NorthPort Batang Pier	2	1	1	22	35	−13	.500	Quarterfinals
3	Blackwater Bossing Red President	2	0	2	27	36	−9	.000	9th–12th classification

Source: PBA 3x3
Rules for classification: 1) Wins; Win ratio if unequal number of games; 2) Head-to-head record; 3) Average points per game; 4) Higher seed.

February 11
11:50 am

Report

NorthPort Batang Pier	7–21	TNT Tropang Giga

Robinsons Las Piñas

February 11
1:30 pm

Report

Blackwater Bossing Red President	14–15	NorthPort Batang Pier

Robinsons Las Piñas

February 11
3:10 pm

Report

TNT Tropang Giga	21–13	Blackwater Bossing Red President

Robinsons Las Piñas

==== Pool D ====
Pos	Team	Pld	W	L	PF	PA	PD	PCT	Qualification
1	Meralco Bolts 3x3	2	2	0	36	31	+5	1.000	Quarterfinals
2	Platinum Karaoke	2	1	1	38	36	+2	.500	Quarterfinals
3	Terrafirma 3x3	2	0	2	27	34	−7	.000	9th–12th classification

Source: PBA 3x3
Rules for classification: 1) Wins; Win ratio if unequal number of games; 2) Head-to-head record; 3) Average points per game; 4) Higher seed.

February 11
12:15 pm

Report

Platinum Karaoke	19–15	Terrafirma 3x3

Robinsons Las Piñas

February 11
1:55 pm

Report

Terrafirma 3x3	12–15	Meralco Bolts 3x3

Robinsons Las Piñas

February 11
3:35 pm

Report

Meralco Bolts 3x3	21–19	Platinum Karaoke

Robinsons Las Piñas

=== Classification 9th–12th ===
February 12
11:00 am

Report

J&T Express	16–22	Blackwater Bossing Red President

Robinsons Las Piñas

February 12
1:55 pm

Report

Pioneer ElastoSeal Katibays	16–21	Terrafirma 3x3

Robinsons Las Piñas

=== Knockout stage ===
Platinum Karaoke defeated Cavitex Braves in the finals, 17–15, to become the fifth leg winners.

==== Bracket ====
Quarterfinals
A1	Cavitex Braves	15
C2	NorthPort Batang Pier	11
D1	Meralco Bolts 3x3	21
B2	Barangay Ginebra San Miguel	14
B1	San Miguel Beermen	20
D2	Platinum Karaoke	21
C1	TNT Tropang Giga	20
A2	Purefoods TJ Titans	18

Semifinals
A1	Cavitex Braves	16
D1	Meralco Bolts 3x3	13
D2	Platinum Karaoke	21
C1	TNT Tropang Giga	18

Finals
A1	Cavitex Braves	15
D2	Platinum Karaoke	17
Third place
D1	Meralco Bolts 3x3	20
C1	TNT Tropang Giga	21

==== Quarterfinals ====
February 12
11:25 am

Report

Cavitex Braves	15–11	NorthPort Batang Pier

Robinsons Las Piñas

February 12
11:50 am

Report

Meralco Bolts 3x3	21–14	Barangay Ginebra San Miguel

Robinsons Las Piñas

February 12
12:15 pm

Report

San Miguel Beermen	20–21	Platinum Karaoke

Robinsons Las Piñas

February 12
12:40 pm

Report

TNT Tropang Giga	20–18	Purefoods TJ Titans

Robinsons Las Piñas

==== Semifinals ====
February 12
1:05 pm

Report

Cavitex Braves	16–13	Meralco Bolts 3x3

Robinsons Las Piñas

February 12
1:30 pm

Report

Platinum Karaoke	21–18	TNT Tropang Giga

Robinsons Las Piñas

==== Third place game ====
February 12
2:35 pm

Report

Meralco Bolts 3x3	20–21	TNT Tropang Giga

Robinsons Las Piñas

==== Finals ====
February 12
3:00 pm

Report

Cavitex Braves	15–17	Platinum Karaoke

Robinsons Las Piñas

=== Final standings ===
Pos	Team	Pld	W	L	PCT	AVG	PF	Tour points
1	Platinum Karaoke	5	4	1	.800	19.4	97	100
2	Cavitex Braves	5	4	1	.800	17.8	89	80
3	TNT Tropang Giga	5	4	1	.800	20.2	101	70
4	Meralco Bolts 3x3	5	3	2	.600	18.0	90	60
Eliminated at the quarterfinals
5	San Miguel Beermen	3	2	1	.667	20.7	62	50
6	Purefoods TJ Titans	3	1	2	.333	18.0	54	45
7	Barangay Ginebra San Miguel	3	1	2	.333	17.7	53	40
8	NorthPort Batang Pier	3	1	2	.333	11.0	33	35
Winners of 9th–12th classification games
9	Blackwater Bossing Red President	3	1	2	.333	16.3	49	20
10	Terrafirma 3x3	3	1	2	.333	16.0	48	18
Losers of 9th–12th classification games
11	J&T Express	3	0	3	.000	17.0	51	16
12	Pioneer ElastoSeal Katibays	3	0	3	.000	13.0	39	14

Source: PBA 3x3

== 6th leg ==
=== Groupings ===
Pool A	Pool B	Pool C	Pool D
Platinum Karaoke (1); NorthPort Batang Pier (8); Blackwater Bossing Red President (9)	Cavitex Braves (2); Barangay Ginebra San Miguel (7); Terrafirma 3x3 (10)	TNT Tropang Giga (3); Purefoods TJ Titans (6); J&T Express (11)	Meralco Bolts 3x3 (4); San Miguel Beermen (5); Pioneer ElastoSeal Katibays (12)

=== Preliminary round ===
==== Pool A ====
Pos	Team	Pld	W	L	PF	PA	PD	PCT	Qualification
1	Blackwater Bossing Red President	2	2	0	43	35	+8	1.000	Quarterfinals
2	Platinum Karaoke	2	1	1	36	38	−2	.500	Quarterfinals
3	NorthPort Batang Pier	2	0	2	35	41	−6	.000	9th–12th classification

Source: PBA 3x3
Rules for classification: 1) Wins; Win ratio if unequal number of games; 2) Head-to-head record; 3) Average points per game; 4) Higher seed.

February 18
11:00 am

Report

NorthPort Batang Pier	19–21	Blackwater Bossing Red President

Robinsons Manila

February 18
12:40 pm

Report

Blackwater Bossing Red President	22–16	Platinum Karaoke

Robinsons Manila

February 18
2:20 pm

Report

Platinum Karaoke	20–16	NorthPort Batang Pier

Robinsons Manila

==== Pool B ====
Pos	Team	Pld	W	L	PF	PA	PD	PCT	Qualification
1	Cavitex Braves	2	1	1	35	34	+1	.500	Quarterfinals
2	Barangay Ginebra San Miguel	2	1	1	34	33	+1	.500	Quarterfinals
3	Terrafirma 3x3	2	1	1	34	36	−2	.500	9th–12th classification

Source: PBA 3x3
Rules for classification: 1) Wins; Win ratio if unequal number of games; 2) Head-to-head record; 3) Average points per game; 4) Higher seed.

February 18
11:25 am

Report

Barangay Ginebra San Miguel	19–15	Terrafirma 3x3

Robinsons Manila

February 18
1:05 pm

Report

Terrafirma 3x3	19–17	Cavitex Braves

Robinsons Manila

February 18
2:45 pm

Report

Cavitex Braves	18–15	Barangay Ginebra San Miguel

Robinsons Manila

==== Pool C ====
Pos	Team	Pld	W	L	PF	PA	PD	PCT	Qualification
1	TNT Tropang Giga	2	1	1	36	36	0	.500	Quarterfinals
2	J&T Express	2	1	1	36	31	+5	.500	Quarterfinals
3	Purefoods TJ Titans	2	1	1	31	36	−5	.500	9th–12th classification

Source: PBA 3x3
Rules for classification: 1) Wins; Win ratio if unequal number of games; 2) Head-to-head record; 3) Average points per game; 4) Higher seed.

February 18
11:50 am

Report

Purefoods TJ Titans	10–21	J&T Express

Robinsons Manila

February 18
1:30 pm

Report

J&T Express	15–21	TNT Tropang Giga

Robinsons Manila

February 18
3:10 pm

Report

TNT Tropang Giga	15–21	Purefoods TJ Titans

Robinsons Manila

==== Pool D ====
Pos	Team	Pld	W	L	PF	PA	PD	PCT	Qualification
1	Meralco Bolts 3x3	2	2	0	36	31	+5	1.000	Quarterfinals
2	Pioneer ElastoSeal Katibays	2	1	1	32	31	+1	.500	Quarterfinals
3	San Miguel Beermen	2	0	2	36	42	−6	.000	9th–12th classification

Source: PBA 3x3
Rules for classification: 1) Wins; Win ratio if unequal number of games; 2) Head-to-head record; 3) Average points per game; 4) Higher seed.

February 18
12:15 pm

Report

San Miguel Beermen	16–21	Pioneer ElastoSeal Katibays

Robinsons Manila

February 18
1:55 pm

Report

Pioneer ElastoSeal Katibays	11–15	Meralco Bolts 3x3

Robinsons Manila

February 18
3:35 pm

Report

Meralco Bolts 3x3	21–20	San Miguel Beermen

Robinsons Manila

=== Classification 9th–12th ===
February 19
11:00 am

Report

NorthPort Batang Pier	17–21	Purefoods TJ Titans

Robinsons Manila

February 19
1:55 pm

Report

Terrafirma 3x3	21–13	San Miguel Beermen

Robinsons Manila

=== Knockout stage ===
==== Bracket ====
Quarterfinals
A1	Blackwater Bossing Red President	16
C2	J&T Express	21
D1	Meralco Bolts 3x3	13
B2	Barangay Ginebra San Miguel	12
B1	Cavitex Braves	20
D2	Pioneer ElastoSeal Katibays	11
C1	TNT Tropang Giga	21
A2	Platinum Karaoke	18

Semifinals
C2	J&T Express	21
D1	Meralco Bolts 3x3	12
B1	Cavitex Braves	15
C1	TNT Tropang Giga	21

Finals
C2	J&T Express	21
C1	TNT Tropang Giga	20
Third place
D1	Meralco Bolts 3x3	20
B1	Cavitex Braves	17

==== Quarterfinals ====
February 19
11:25 am

Report

Blackwater Bossing Red President	16–21	J&T Express

Robinsons Manila

February 19
11:50 am

Report

Meralco Bolts 3x3	13–12	Barangay Ginebra San Miguel

Robinsons Manila

February 19
12:15 pm

Report

Cavitex Braves	20–11	Pioneer ElastoSeal Katibays

Robinsons Manila

February 19
12:40 pm

Report

TNT Tropang Giga	21–18	Platinum Karaoke

Robinsons Manila

==== Semifinals ====
February 19
1:05 pm

Report

J&T Express	21–12	Meralco Bolts 3x3

Robinsons Manila

February 19
1:30 pm

Report

Cavitex Braves	15–21	TNT Tropang Giga

Robinsons Manila

==== Third place game ====
February 19
2:35 pm

Report

Meralco Bolts 3x3	20–17	Cavitex Braves

Robinsons Manila

==== Finals ====
February 19
3:00 pm

Report

J&T Express	21–20	TNT Tropang Giga

Robinsons Manila

=== Final standings ===
Pos	Team	Pld	W	L	PCT	AVG	PF	Tour points
1	J&T Express	5	4	1	.800	19.8	99	100
2	TNT Tropang Giga	5	3	2	.600	19.6	98	80
3	Meralco Bolts 3x3	5	4	1	.800	16.2	81	70
4	Cavitex Braves	5	2	3	.400	17.4	87	60
Eliminated at the quarterfinals
5	Blackwater Bossing Red President	3	2	1	.667	19.7	59	50
6	Platinum Karaoke	3	1	2	.333	18.0	54	45
7	Barangay Ginebra San Miguel	3	1	2	.333	15.3	46	40
8	Pioneer ElastoSeal Katibays	3	1	2	.333	14.3	43	35
Winners of 9th–12th classification games
9	Purefoods TJ Titans	3	2	1	.667	17.3	52	20
10	Terrafirma 3x3	3	2	1	.667	18.3	55	18
Losers of 9th–12th classification games
11	NorthPort Batang Pier	3	0	3	.000	17.3	52	16
12	San Miguel Beermen	3	0	3	.000	16.3	49	14

Source: PBA 3x3

== Legs summary ==
Pos	Team	1st leg	2nd leg	3rd leg	4th leg	5th leg	6th leg	Pts	Qualification
1	TNT Tropang Giga	4th	1st	5th	3rd	3rd	2nd	430	Qualification to Grand Finals quarterfinal round
2	Cavitex Braves	3rd	4th	6th	1st	2nd	4th	415	Qualification to Grand Finals quarterfinal round
3	Meralco Bolts 3x3	8th	3rd	3rd	5th	4th	3rd	355	Qualification to Grand Finals quarterfinal round
4	Barangay Ginebra San Miguel	5th	2nd	1st	7th	7th	7th	350	Qualification to Grand Finals quarterfinal round
5	Platinum Karaoke	9th	10th	2nd	4th	1st	6th	323	Qualification to Grand Finals preliminary round
6	J&T Express	6th	6th	4th	8th	11th	1st	301	Qualification to Grand Finals preliminary round
7	Pioneer ElastoSeal Katibays	2nd	9th	8th	2nd	12th	8th	264	Qualification to Grand Finals preliminary round
8	San Miguel Beermen	1st	5th	11th	10th	5th	12th	248	Qualification to Grand Finals preliminary round
9	Blackwater Bossing Red President	10th	7th	10th	6th	9th	5th	191	Qualification to Grand Finals preliminary round
10	Purefoods TJ Titans	7th	8th	9th	9th	6th	9th	180	Qualification to Grand Finals preliminary round
11	Terrafirma 3x3	11th	12th	7th	12th	10th	10th	120	
12	NorthPort Batang Pier	12th	11th	12th	11th	8th	11th	111	

Source: PBA 3x3 Report

== Grand Finals ==
=== Preliminary round ===
==== Pool A ====
Pos	Team	Pld	W	L	PF	PA	PD	PCT	Qualification
1	Platinum Karaoke	2	1	1	40	35	+5	.500	Quarterfinals
2	San Miguel Beermen	2	1	1	37	40	−3	.500	Quarterfinals
3	Blackwater Bossing Red President	2	1	1	36	38	−2	.500	

Source: PBA 3x3
Rules for classification: 1) Wins; Win ratio if unequal number of games; 2) Head-to-head record; 3) Average points per game; 4) Higher seed.

February 26
10:00 am

Report

Blackwater Bossing Red President	21–17	San Miguel Beermen

Robinsons Las Piñas

February 26
10:50 am

Report

Platinum Karaoke	21–15	Blackwater Bossing Red President

Robinsons Las Piñas

February 26
11:40 am

Report

San Miguel Beermen	20–19	Platinum Karaoke

Robinsons Las Piñas

==== Pool B ====
Pos	Team	Pld	W	L	PF	PA	PD	PCT	Qualification
1	J&T Express	2	2	0	38	24	+14	1.000	Quarterfinals
2	Purefoods TJ Titans	2	1	1	32	31	+1	.500	Quarterfinals
3	Pioneer ElastoSeal Katibays	2	0	2	23	38	−15	.000	

Source: PBA 3x3
Rules for classification: 1) Wins; Win ratio if unequal number of games; 2) Head-to-head record; 3) Average points per game; 4) Higher seed.

February 26
10:25 am

Report

Purefoods TJ Titans	17–14	Pioneer ElastoSeal Katibays

Robinsons Las Piñas

February 26
11:15 am

Report

J&T Express	17–15	Purefoods TJ Titans

Robinsons Las Piñas

February 26
12:05 pm

Report

Pioneer ElastoSeal Katibays	9–21	J&T Express

Robinsons Las Piñas

=== Knockout stage ===
==== Bracket ====
Seed refers to the position of the team after six legs. Letter and number inside parentheses denotes the pool letter and pool position of the team, respectively, after the preliminary round of the Grand Finals.

Quarterfinals
1	TNT Tropang Giga	21
10 (B2)	Purefoods TJ Titans	15
5 (A1)	Platinum Karaoke	15
4	Barangay Ginebra San Miguel	16
8 (A2)	San Miguel Beermen	21
2	Cavitex Braves	19
3	Meralco Bolts 3x3	13
6 (B1)	J&T Express	14

Semifinals
1	TNT Tropang Giga	21
4	Barangay Ginebra San Miguel	16
8 (A2)	San Miguel Beermen	20
6 (B1)	J&T Express	18

Finals
1	TNT Tropang Giga	21
8 (A2)	San Miguel Beermen	18
Third place
4	Barangay Ginebra San Miguel	21
6 (B1)	J&T Express	18

==== Quarterfinals ====
February 26
12:30 pm

Report

Platinum Karaoke	15–16	Barangay Ginebra San Miguel

Robinsons Las Piñas

February 26
12:55 pm

Report

TNT Tropang Giga	21–15	Purefoods TJ Titans

Robinsons Las Piñas

February 26
1:20 pm

Report

San Miguel Beermen	21–19	Cavitex Braves

Robinsons Las Piñas

February 26
1:45 pm

Report

Meralco Bolts 3x3	13–14	J&T Express

Robinsons Las Piñas

==== Semifinals ====
February 26
2:35 pm

Report

TNT Tropang Giga	21–16	Barangay Ginebra San Miguel

Robinsons Las Piñas

February 26
3:00 pm

Report

San Miguel Beermen	20–18	J&T Express

Robinsons Las Piñas

==== Third place game ====
February 26
3:40 pm

Report

Barangay Ginebra San Miguel	21–18	J&T Express

Robinsons Las Piñas

==== Finals ====
February 26
4:05 pm

Report

TNT Tropang Giga	21–18	San Miguel Beermen

Robinsons Las Piñas
