= Meralco (disambiguation) =

Meralco is an electric power distribution company in the Philippines serving the Greater Manila Area.

Meralco may also refer to:

== Sports ==
- Meralco Bolts, Philippine professional basketball team
- Meralco Bolts 3x3, basketball team
- Meralco Power Spikers, Philippine women's volleyball team
- Meralco Reddy Kilowatts, basketball team

== Places ==
- Meralco Avenue, road in Pasig, Metro Manila, Philippines
- Meralco Theater, theater in Pasig, Metro Manila, Philippines
