= 2023–24 PBA 3x3 season =

3rd PBA 3x3 season

- Duration: July 3, 2023 – February 19, 2024
- Teams: 11
- 1st Conference champions: TNT Triple Giga
- 1st Conference runners-up: Cavitex Braves
- 2nd Conference champions: TNT Triple Giga
- 2nd Conference runners-up: Meralco Bolts 3x3
- 3rd Conference champions: Meralco Bolts 3x3
- 3rd Conference runners-up: TNT Triple Giga

Seasons
- ← 2022–23

The 2023–24 PBA 3x3 season is the third and last season of the PBA 3x3, the 3x3 basketball league of the Philippine Basketball Association.

== Teams ==
All 12 franchise teams of the main 5-a-side Philippine Basketball Association are eligible to field a 3x3 team for the 2023–24 PBA 3x3 season, although the Converge FiberXers, Phoenix Super LPG Fuel Masters, and Rain or Shine Elasto Painters did not field a team. The Blackwater Bossing Red President changed their name into Blackwater Smooth Razor before the season. Two guest teams (Pioneer ElastoSeal Katibays and Wilcon Depot 3x3) participated, with Wilcon Depot 3x3 debuting this season, committing to play for at least one conference. Guest teams J&T Express and Platinum Karaoke, who both appeared during the previous season, took a leave of absence for this season.

Wilcon Depot 3x3 eventually became defunct after the first conference and was replaced by MCFASolver Tech Centrale starting from the second conference.

| Team | Company | Coach |
|---|---|---|
| Barangay Ginebra San Miguel | Ginebra San Miguel, Inc. | Kirk Collier |
| Blackwater Smooth Razor | Ever Bilena | Junjie Ablan |
| Cavitex Braves | Metro Pacific Investments Corporation | Kyles Lao |
| Meralco Bolts 3x3 | Manila Electric Company | Patrick Fran |
| MCFASolver Tech Centrale (Note: Wilcon Depot 3x3 became defunct after the first conference. MCFASolver Tech Centrale replaced the team starting from the second conference.) | MCFASolver Tech Centrale | Anton Altamirano |
| NorthPort Batang Pier | Sultan 900 Capital, Inc. | Alfredo Jarencio II |
| Pioneer ElastoSeal Katibays | Pioneer Epoxy Adhesives Inc. | Lester del Rosario |
| Purefoods TJ Titans | San Miguel Food and Beverage, Inc. | Tony Boy Espinosa |
| San Miguel Beermen | San Miguel Brewery, Inc. | Boycie Zamar |
| Terrafirma 3x3 | Terrafirma Realty Development Corporation | Raymond Tiongco |
| TNT Triple Giga | Smart Communications | Mau Belen |
| Wilcon Depot 3x3 | Wilcon Depot Inc. | Anton Altamirano |

== Format ==
The season's format will be highly similar to that of the previous season. The season will have three tournaments or conferences. Each conference will have six two-day legs and a grand final. The 11 teams will be divided into four pools, with pool A having three teams while pools B and C having four each. Teams within their pools will play in a single round-robin format. The top two teams of pool A and the top three teams of pools B and C will directly qualify for the quarterfinals. The knockout stage will be a single-elimination tournament and a third place game will also be held. The winner of each leg will receive ₱100,000, the runner-up will receive ₱50,000, while the third placed team will receive ₱30,000. The seedings and pool compositions for each leg will be based on the results of the preceding leg.

After six legs, the cumulative standings will be calculated and the top four teams will directly qualify for the quarterfinals of the Grand Finals. The fifth to tenth-placed teams will qualify for the preliminary round of the Grand Finals. The bottom teams will not qualify for the Grand Finals. The Grand Champion will receive ₱750,000, the runner-up will receive ₱250,000, while the third placed team will receive ₱100,000.

Starting this season, the games were played in various Ayala Malls branches. In the first two years of PBA 3x3, the games were held at different Robinsons Malls branches.

== First conference ==
The conference started on July 3 and ended on August 13, 2023.

=== Legs summary ===
| Pos | Team | 1st leg | 2nd leg | 3rd leg | 4th leg | 5th leg | 6th leg | Pts | Qualification |
|---|---|---|---|---|---|---|---|---|---|
| 1 | Cavitex Braves | 3rd | 3rd | 3rd | 1st | 1st | 2nd | 490 | Qualification to Grand Finals quarterfinal round |
| 2 | TNT Triple Giga | 6th | 9th | 1st | 2nd | 6th | 1st | 390 | Qualification to Grand Finals quarterfinal round |
| 3 | Barangay Ginebra San Miguel | 1st | 1st | 7th | 10th | 3rd | 5th | 378 | Qualification to Grand Finals quarterfinal round |
| 4 | Meralco Bolts 3x3 | 7th | 2nd | 6th | 3rd | 5th | 4th | 345 | Qualification to Grand Finals quarterfinal round |
| 5 | San Miguel Beermen | 2nd | 5th | 4th | 5th | 10th | 7th | 298 | Qualification to Grand Finals preliminary round |
| 6 | Wilcon Depot 3x3 | 5th | 8th | 5th | 4th | 11th | 3rd | 281 | Qualification to Grand Finals preliminary round |
| 7 | Pioneer ElastoSeal Katibays | 8th | 6th | 2nd | 9th | 2nd | 11th | 276 | Qualification to Grand Finals preliminary round |
| 8 | Blackwater Smooth Razor | 9th | 4th | 8th | 8th | 7th | 10th | 208 | Qualification to Grand Finals preliminary round |
| 9 | NorthPort Batang Pier | 11th | 11th | 11th | 6th | 4th | 8th | 188 | Qualification to Grand Finals preliminary round |
| 10 | Terrafirma 3x3 | 4th | 10th | 10th | 7th | 9th | 9th | 176 | Qualification to Grand Finals preliminary round |
| 11 | Purefoods TJ Titans | 10th | 7th | 9th | 11th | 8th | 6th | 174 | |

Source: PBA 3x3 Report

=== Grand Finals ===
==== Preliminary round ====
===== Pool A =====
| Pos | Team | Pld | W | L | PF | PA | PD | PCT | Qualification |
|---|---|---|---|---|---|---|---|---|---|
| 1 | San Miguel Beermen | 2 | 1 | 1 | 38 | 30 | +8 | .500 | Quarterfinals |
| 2 | Blackwater Smooth Razor | 2 | 1 | 1 | 33 | 34 | −1 | .500 | Quarterfinals |
| 3 | NorthPort Batang Pier | 2 | 1 | 1 | 27 | 34 | −7 | .500 | |

Source: PBA 3x3
Rules for classification: 1) Wins; Win ratio if unequal number of games; 2) Head-to-head record; 3) Average points per game; 4) Higher seed.

===== Pool B =====
| Pos | Team | Pld | W | L | PF | PA | PD | PCT | Qualification |
|---|---|---|---|---|---|---|---|---|---|
| 1 | Wilcon Depot 3x3 | 2 | 1 | 1 | 37 | 33 | +4 | .500 | Quarterfinals |
| 2 | Pioneer ElastoSeal Katibays | 2 | 1 | 1 | 34 | 31 | +3 | .500 | Quarterfinals |
| 3 | Terrafirma 3x3 | 2 | 1 | 1 | 28 | 35 | −7 | .500 | |

Source: PBA 3x3
Rules for classification: 1) Wins; Win ratio if unequal number of games; 2) Head-to-head record; 3) Average points per game; 4) Higher seed.

==== Knockout stage ====
===== Bracket =====
Seed refers to the position of the team after six legs. Letter and number inside parentheses denotes the pool letter and pool position of the team, respectively, after the preliminary round of the Grand Finals.

Quarterfinals
1 | Cavitex Braves | 21
7 (B2) | Pioneer ElastoSeal Katibays | 12
5 (A1) | San Miguel Beermen | 14
4 | Meralco Bolts 3x3 | 16
3 | Barangay Ginebra San Miguel | 18
6 (B1) | Wilcon Depot 3x3 | 14
8 (A2) | Blackwater Smooth Razor | 17
2 | TNT Triple Giga | 21

Semifinals
1 | Cavitex Braves | 17
4 | Meralco Bolts 3x3 | 16
3 | Barangay Ginebra San Miguel | 16
2 | TNT Triple Giga | 21

Finals
1 | Cavitex Braves | 18
2 | TNT Triple Giga | 21
Third place
4 | Meralco Bolts 3x3 | 18
3 | Barangay Ginebra San Miguel | 14

== Second conference ==
The conference started on October 16 and ended on November 27, 2023.

=== Legs summary ===
| Pos | Team | 1st leg | 2nd leg | 3rd leg | 4th leg | 5th leg | 6th leg | Pts | Qualification |
|---|---|---|---|---|---|---|---|---|---|
| 1 | TNT Triple Giga | 1st | 1st | 1st | 4th | 1st | 1st | 560 | Qualification to Grand Finals quarterfinal round |
| 2 | Meralco Bolts 3x3 | 3rd | 5th | 3rd | 2nd | 5th | 3rd | 390 | Qualification to Grand Finals quarterfinal round |
| 3 | Cavitex Braves | 2nd | 7th | 2nd | 6th | 7th | 2nd | 365 | Qualification to Grand Finals quarterfinal round |
| 4 | Pioneer ElastoSeal Katibays | 11th | 3rd | 4th | 3rd | 2nd | 4th | 356 | Qualification to Grand Finals quarterfinal round |
| 5 | MCFASolver Tech Centrale | 4th | 6th | 9th | 1st | 3rd | 5th | 345 | Qualification to Grand Finals preliminary round |
| 6 | Blackwater Smooth Razor | 7th | 4th | 7th | 7th | 11th | 8th | 231 | Qualification to Grand Finals preliminary round |
| 7 | Terrafirma 3x3 | 10th | 2nd | 6th | 11th | 6th | 11th | 220 | Qualification to Grand Finals preliminary round |
| 8 | Purefoods TJ Titans | 6th | 10th | 5th | 8th | 8th | 9th | 203 | Qualification to Grand Finals preliminary round |
| 9 | San Miguel Beermen | 8th | 8th | 11th | 5th | 10th | 7th | 194 | Qualification to Grand Finals preliminary round |
| 10 | Barangay Ginebra San Miguel | 5th | 9th | 10th | 9th | 9th | 6th | 173 | Qualification to Grand Finals preliminary round |
| 11 | NorthPort Batang Pier | 9th | 11th | 8th | 10th | 4th | 10th | 167 | |

Source: PBA 3x3 Report

=== Grand Finals ===
==== Preliminary round ====
===== Pool A =====
| Pos | Team | Pld | W | L | PF | PA | PD | PCT | Qualification |
|---|---|---|---|---|---|---|---|---|---|
| 1 | San Miguel Beermen | 2 | 1 | 1 | 37 | 34 | +3 | .500 | Quarterfinals |
| 2 | Purefoods TJ Titans | 2 | 1 | 1 | 34 | 38 | −4 | .500 | Quarterfinals |
| 3 | MCFASolver Tech Centrale | 2 | 1 | 1 | 32 | 31 | +1 | .500 | |

Source: PBA 3x3
Rules for classification: 1) Wins; Win ratio if unequal number of games; 2) Head-to-head record; 3) Average points per game; 4) Higher seed.

===== Pool B =====
| Pos | Team | Pld | W | L | PF | PA | PD | PCT | Qualification |
|---|---|---|---|---|---|---|---|---|---|
| 1 | Blackwater Smooth Razor | 2 | 2 | 0 | 36 | 31 | +5 | 1.000 | Quarterfinals |
| 2 | Barangay Ginebra San Miguel | 2 | 1 | 1 | 35 | 33 | +2 | .500 | Quarterfinals |
| 3 | Terrafirma 3x3 | 2 | 0 | 2 | 35 | 42 | −7 | .000 | |

Source: PBA 3x3
Rules for classification: 1) Wins; Win ratio if unequal number of games; 2) Head-to-head record; 3) Average points per game; 4) Higher seed.

==== Knockout stage ====
===== Bracket =====
Seed refers to the position of the team after six legs. Letter and number inside parentheses denotes the pool letter and pool position of the team, respectively, after the preliminary round of the Grand Finals.

Quarterfinals
1 | TNT Triple Giga | 19
10 (B2) | Barangay Ginebra San Miguel | 17
9 (A1) | San Miguel Beermen | 16
4 | Pioneer ElastoSeal Katibays | 21
3 | Cavitex Braves | 22
6 (B1) | Blackwater Smooth Razor | 11
8 (A2) | Purefoods TJ Titans | 10
2 | Meralco Bolts 3x3 | 21

Semifinals
1 | TNT Triple Giga | 21
4 | Pioneer ElastoSeal Katibays | 13
3 | Cavitex Braves | 16
2 | Meralco Bolts 3x3 | 22

Finals
1 | TNT Triple Giga | 21
2 | Meralco Bolts 3x3 | 20
Third place
4 | Pioneer ElastoSeal Katibays | 16
3 | Cavitex Braves | 15

== Third conference ==
The conference started on December 11, 2023, and ended on February 19, 2024.

=== Legs summary ===
| Pos | Team | 1st leg | 2nd leg | 3rd leg | 4th leg | 5th leg | 6th leg | Pts | Qualification |
|---|---|---|---|---|---|---|---|---|---|
| 1 | Meralco Bolts 3x3 | 1st | 5th | 1st | 1st | 2nd | 4th | 490 | Qualification to Grand Finals quarterfinal round |
| 2 | TNT Triple Giga | 7th | 7th | 2nd | 2nd | 1st | 3rd | 410 | Qualification to Grand Finals quarterfinal round |
| 3 | Cavitex Braves | 3rd | 3rd | 6th | 6th | 3rd | 1st | 400 | Qualification to Grand Finals quarterfinal round |
| 4 | MCFASolver Tech Centrale | 2nd | 1st | 3rd | 4th | 4th | 9th | 390 | Qualification to Grand Finals quarterfinal round |
| 5 | Blackwater Smooth Razor | 5th | 4th | 11th | 3rd | 9th | 2nd | 296 | Qualification to Grand Finals preliminary round |
| 6 | San Miguel Beermen | 11th | 2nd | 4th | 5th | 6th | 11th | 267 | Qualification to Grand Finals preliminary round |
| 7 | Purefoods TJ Titans | 4th | 6th | 10th | 8th | 10th | 8th | 211 | Qualification to Grand Finals preliminary round |
| 8 | Pioneer ElastoSeal Katibays | 8th | 10th | 5th | 11th | 7th | 5th | 209 | Qualification to Grand Finals preliminary round |
| 9 | Terrafirma 3x3 | 9th | 8th | 7th | 10th | 5th | 7th | 203 | Qualification to Grand Finals preliminary round |
| 10 | Barangay Ginebra San Miguel | 6th | 11th | 9th | 9th | 8th | 6th | 181 | Qualification to Grand Finals preliminary round |
| 11 | NorthPort Batang Pier | 10th | 9th | 8th | 7th | 11th | 10th | 147 | |

Source: PBA 3x3 Report

=== Grand Finals ===
==== Preliminary round ====
===== Pool A =====
| Pos | Team | Pld | W | L | PF | PA | PD | PCT | Qualification |
|---|---|---|---|---|---|---|---|---|---|
| 1 | Blackwater Smooth Razor | 2 | 2 | 0 | 41 | 33 | +8 | 1.000 | Quarterfinals |
| 2 | Pioneer ElastoSeal Katibays | 2 | 1 | 1 | 39 | 31 | +8 | .500 | Quarterfinals |
| 3 | Terrafirma 3x3 | 2 | 0 | 2 | 27 | 43 | −16 | .000 | |

Source: PBA 3x3
Rules for classification: 1) Wins; Win ratio if unequal number of games; 2) Head-to-head record; 3) Average points per game; 4) Higher seed.

===== Pool B =====
| Pos | Team | Pld | W | L | PF | PA | PD | PCT | Qualification |
|---|---|---|---|---|---|---|---|---|---|
| 1 | Purefoods TJ Titans | 2 | 1 | 1 | 39 | 39 | 0 | .500 | Quarterfinals |
| 2 | Barangay Ginebra San Miguel | 2 | 1 | 1 | 38 | 34 | +4 | .500 | Quarterfinals |
| 3 | San Miguel Beermen | 2 | 1 | 1 | 35 | 39 | −4 | .500 | |

Source: PBA 3x3
Rules for classification: 1) Wins; Win ratio if unequal number of games; 2) Head-to-head record; 3) Average points per game; 4) Higher seed.

==== Knockout stage ====
===== Bracket =====
Seed refers to the position of the team after six legs. Letter and number inside parentheses denotes the pool letter and pool position of the team, respectively, after the preliminary round of the Grand Finals.

Quarterfinals
3 | Meralco Bolts 3x3 | 22
10 (B1) | Barangay Ginebra San Miguel | 10
5 (A1) | Blackwater Smooth Razor | 21
4 | MCFASolver Tech Centrale | 20
1 | Cavitex Braves | 21
7 (B2) | Purefoods TJ Titans | 17
8 (A2) | Pioneer ElastoSeal Katibays | 14
2 | TNT Triple Giga | 21

Semifinals
3 | Meralco Bolts 3x3 | 21
5 (A1) | Blackwater Smooth Razor | 20
1 | Cavitex Braves | 17
2 | TNT Triple Giga | 19

Finals
3 | Meralco Bolts 3x3 | 21
2 | TNT Triple Giga | 17
Third place
5 (A1) | Blackwater Smooth Razor | 19
1 | Cavitex Braves | 22
