= Robinsons Las Piñas =

Shopping mall in Las Piñas, Philippines

- Location: Las Piñas, Metro Manila, Philippines
- Coordinates: 14°26′37″N 120°59′55″E
- Address: Alabang–Zapote Road, Talon Tres
- Opened: October 25, 2014; 12 years ago
- Developer: JG Summit Holdings
- Manager: Robinsons Malls
- Owner: John Gokongwei
- Num. of stores: 200
- Num. of anchor tenants: 6
- Floor area: 59,877 m^{2} (644,510 sq ft)
- Floors: 3 (2 floors with 1 basement level for parking)
- Parking: more than 1000 cars
- Public transit: 24 Robinsons Las Piñas
- Website: robinsonsmalls.com/mall-info/robinsons-place-las-pinas

Robinsons Las Piñas (formerly known as Robinsons Place Las Piñas), is a shopping mall and mixed-use development in Las Piñas, Philippines. It is located on the north side of Alabang–Zapote Road between CAA Road and Admiral Road in Talon Tres. The mall is owned and managed by Robinsons Land Corporation, the second largest mall operator in the Philippines. The mall opened on October 25, 2014. It is the 38th mall opened by Robinsons in the Philippines and the first and only Robinsons mall in Las Piñas and the whole South Manila area.

== Description ==
Robinsons Las Piñas sits on a 6.8-hectare (17-acre) lot on the busy Alabang-Zapote Road in close proximity to several heavily populated and middle-class subdivisions in the south Manila area of Las Piñas and Parañaque such as BF Homes, CAA-BF International, Casimiro Village and BF Resort Village. It has a gross floor area of 59,877 square metres (644,510 ft^{2}) with a gross leasable area of 25,734 square metres (277,000 ft^{2}). The two-storey shopping center is anchored by Robinsons staples like Robinsons Department Store, Robinsons Supermarket, Robinsons Appliances and Robinsons MovieWorld. The mall is also part of a mixed-use development that will also consist of a mid-rise residential complex of Robinsons Communities.
