= MCFASolver Tech Centrale =

- Leagues: PBA 3x3
- Founded: 2023
- Folded: 2024
- Location: Lubao, Pampanga
- Company: MCFASolver Tech Centrale
- Head coach: Anton Altamirano

MCFASolver Tech Centrale was a Philippine 3x3 basketball team which competes in the PBA 3x3, organized by the Philippines' top-flight professional league, Philippine Basketball Association.

== History ==
The team is under the ownership of an electronics and appliance company of the same name based in Lubao, Pampanga. The team would play as Lubao MCFASolver–Pampanga at the 2023 Cebu Masters, the tournament which Wilcon Depot 3x3 originally qualified for.

MCFASolver Tech Centrale are set to enter the PBA 3x3, at least for the second and third conference of the 2023–24 season. The initial roster was made from the core of former team, Wilcon Depot 3x3.

Following the shelving of the PBA 3x3 after the conclusion of the 2023–24 season, the team would be disbanded.
