= Cavitex Braves =

CAVITEX Braves
- Leagues: PBA 3x3
- Founded: 2021
- Folded: 2024
- Team colors: Blue, orange, white
- Company: NLEX Corporation
- Ownership: Manuel V. Pangilinan

The CAVITEX Braves were a Philippine 3x3 basketball team which competed in the PBA 3x3, organized by the Philippines' top-flight professional league, Philippine Basketball Association (PBA). The team is affiliated with the NLEX Road Warriors, a member franchise of the PBA.

== History ==
The NLEX Road Warriors were among the participating PBA franchise teams in the inaugural 2021 PBA 3x3 season. Instead of competing under the same name as their mother team, the 3x3 team competed under the name "Cavitex Braves", named after the Manila–Cavite Expressway (CAVITEX).

Following the shelving of the PBA 3x3 after the conclusion of the 2023–24 season, the team would be disbanded.
