= Meralco Bolts 3x3 =

- Leagues: PBA 3x3
- Founded: 2021
- Folded: 2024
- Team colors: Navy blue, orange, white
- Company: Manila Electric Company
- Head coach: Patrick Fran
- Ownership: Manuel V. Pangilinan
- Championships: 1 championship(s); 2023–24 Third conference

The Meralco Bolts 3x3 were a Philippine 3x3 basketball team which competed in the PBA 3x3, organized by the Philippines' top-flight professional league, Philippine Basketball Association (PBA). The team is affiliated with the Meralco Bolts, a member franchise of the PBA.

== History ==
The Meralco Bolts, competing as Meralco Bolts 3x3, are among the participating PBA franchise teams in the inaugural 2021 PBA 3x3 season.

Meralco would clinch its first ever title by winning the grand finals of the third conference of the 2023–24 PBA 3x3 season breaking the title streak of TNT Triple Giga which has won the previous six conferences.

Following the shelving of the PBA 3x3 after the conclusion of the 2023–24 season, the team would be disbanded.

Its players and staff would become part of the Philippine national under-23 3x3 team which played in the 2024 3x3 FIBA Nations League.
