= Blackwater Smooth Razor =

- Leagues: PBA 3x3
- Founded: 2022
- Folded: 2024
- History: Blackwater Bossing Red President (2022–2023); Blackwater Smooth Razor (2023–2024)
- Team colors: Red, black, white
- Company: Ever Bilena
- Head coach: Junjie Ablan

The Blackwater Smooth Razor was a Philippine 3x3 basketball team which competed in the PBA 3x3, organized by the Philippines' top-flight professional league, Philippine Basketball Association (PBA). The team is affiliated with the PBA member franchise team Blackwater Bossing.

== History ==
Blackwater Bossing did not field a team in the inaugural 2021 PBA 3x3 season despite being one of the twelve regular franchise teams of the main 5x5 PBA league. This is due to cost-cutting measures of Blackwater's parent company Ever Bilena which was significantly impacted by the COVID-19 pandemic. Blackwater announced intention to join in for the third conference in May 2022 but ultimately did not take part. The team later joined the PBA 3x3 in the 2022–23 season.

Following the shelving of the PBA 3x3 after the conclusion of the 2023–24 season, the team would be disbanded.
