= 2022–23 PBA 3x3 season – Second conference =

Second conference of the 2022–23 PBA 3x3 season

The second conference of the 2022–23 PBA 3x3 season started on November 5 and ended on December 17, 2022. It consisted of six two-day legs and a grand final. TNT Tropang Giga became the conference's Grand Champion after defeating Cavitex Braves in the Grand Finals, 19–17.

== Teams ==
The players listed have played in at least one of the legs.

Team	Players					
Barangay Ginebra San Miguel	Ralph Cu	Donald Gumaru	James Mangahas	Dennice Villamor	Kim Aurin	
Blackwater Bossing Red President	Richard Escoto	Jeff Javillonar	Prince Rivero	Alfrancis Tamsi	Hubert Cani	Maclean Sabellina
Cavitex Braves	Sherwin Concepcion	Bong Galanza	Jorey Napoles	Tzaddy Rangel	Dominick Fajardo	Chester Saldua
J&T Express	Marvin Hayes	Robin Roño	Joseph Sedurifa	Jeric Teng	Keith Datu	
Meralco Bolts 3x3	Alfred Batino	Reymar Caduyac	Joseph Manlangit	Kenneth Mocon	Leo de Vera	Tonino Gonzaga
NorthPort Batang Pier	John Apacible	Wilson Baltazar	Gwyne Capacio	Dexter Zamora	LA Revilla	Jan Sobrevega
Pioneer ElastoSeal Katibays	Gian Abrigo	Clint Doliguez	Christian Rivera	Reeve Ugsang	Jon Jon Gabriel	Reggie Morido
Platinum Karaoke	Yutien Andrada	Brandon Bates	Nico Salva	Terrence Tumalip	Yves Sazon	Raphael Banal
Purefoods TJ Titans	Ronnie de Leon	Joseph Eriobu	Andrew Estella	Nichole Ubalde	Lander Canon	Mikey Cabahug
San Miguel Beermen	Ken Bono	Wendell Comboy	Carlo de Chavez	Jeff Manday	Chris de Chavez	Jammer Jamito
Terrafirma 3x3	Red Cachuela	Sandy Ceñal	Bryan Santos	Jeremiah Taladua	Shaq Alanes	Enrique Caunan
TNT Tropang Giga	Chris Exciminiano	Lervin Flores	Gryann Mendoza	Almond Vosotros	Rey Mark Acuno	Samboy de Leon

== 1st leg ==
=== Groupings ===
Pool A	Pool B	Pool C	Pool D
J&T Express; Terrafirma 3x3 Pioneer ElastoSeal Katibays	Purefoods TJ Titans; Meralco Bolts 3x3 Barangay Ginebra San Miguel	Cavitex Braves; Blackwater Bossing Red President; Platinum Karaoke	San Miguel Beermen; TNT Tropang Giga; NorthPort Batang Pier

=== Preliminary round ===
==== Pool A ====
Pos	Team	Pld	W	L	PF	PA	PD	PCT	Qualification
1	J&T Express	2	2	0	42	32	+10	1.000	Quarterfinals
2	Terrafirma 3x3	2	1	1	30	36	−6	.500	Quarterfinals
3	Pioneer ElastoSeal Katibays	2	0	2	35	39	−4	.000	9th–12th classification

Source: PBA 3x3
Rules for classification: 1) Wins; Win ratio if unequal number of games; 2) Head-to-head record; 3) Average points per game; 4) Higher seed.

November 5
11:00 am

Report

Terrafirma 3x3	18–15	Pioneer ElastoSeal Katibays

Robinsons Place Antipolo

November 5
12:40 pm

Report

J&T Express	21–20	Pioneer ElastoSeal Katibays

Robinsons Place Antipolo

November 5
2:20 pm

Report

J&T Express	21–12	Terrafirma 3x3

Robinsons Place Antipolo

==== Pool B ====
Pos	Team	Pld	W	L	PF	PA	PD	PCT	Qualification
1	Barangay Ginebra San Miguel	2	2	0	42	25	+17	1.000	Quarterfinals
2	Purefoods TJ Titans	2	1	1	30	36	−6	.500	Quarterfinals
3	Meralco Bolts 3x3	2	0	2	27	38	−11	.000	9th–12th classification

Source: PBA 3x3
Rules for classification: 1) Wins; Win ratio if unequal number of games; 2) Head-to-head record; 3) Average points per game; 4) Higher seed.

November 5
11:25 am

Report

Purefoods TJ Titans	13–21	Barangay Ginebra San Miguel

Robinsons Place Antipolo

November 5
1:05 pm

Report

Meralco Bolts 3x3	12–21	Barangay Ginebra San Miguel

Robinsons Place Antipolo

November 5
2:45 pm

Report

Purefoods TJ Titans	17–15	Meralco Bolts 3x3

Robinsons Place Antipolo

==== Pool C ====
Pos	Team	Pld	W	L	PF	PA	PD	PCT	Qualification
1	Platinum Karaoke	2	1	1	36	30	+6	.500	Quarterfinals
2	Cavitex Braves	2	1	1	31	34	−3	.500	Quarterfinals
3	Blackwater Bossing Red President	2	1	1	28	31	−3	.500	9th–12th classification

Source: PBA 3x3
Rules for classification: 1) Wins; Win ratio if unequal number of games; 2) Head-to-head record; 3) Average points per game; 4) Higher seed.

November 5
11:50 am

Report

Platinum Karaoke	19–11	Blackwater Bossing Red President

Robinsons Place Antipolo

November 5
1:30 pm

Report

Cavitex Braves	12–17	Blackwater Bossing Red President

Robinsons Place Antipolo

November 5
3:10 pm

Report

Platinum Karaoke	17–19	Cavitex Braves

Robinsons Place Antipolo

==== Pool D ====
Pos	Team	Pld	W	L	PF	PA	PD	PCT	Qualification
1	TNT Tropang Giga	2	2	0	42	28	+14	1.000	Quarterfinals
2	San Miguel Beermen	2	1	1	38	26	+12	.500	Quarterfinals
3	NorthPort Batang Pier	2	0	2	16	42	−26	.000	9th–12th classification

Source: PBA 3x3
Rules for classification: 1) Wins; Win ratio if unequal number of games; 2) Head-to-head record; 3) Average points per game; 4) Higher seed.

November 5
12:15 pm

Report

TNT Tropang Giga	21–11	NorthPort Batang Pier

Robinsons Place Antipolo

November 5
1:55 pm

Report

San Miguel Beermen	21–5	NorthPort Batang Pier

Robinsons Place Antipolo

November 5
3:35 pm

Report

TNT Tropang Giga	21–17	San Miguel Beermen

Robinsons Place Antipolo

=== Classification 9th–12th ===
November 6
11:00 am

Report

Pioneer ElastoSeal Katibays	15–22	Blackwater Bossing Red President

Robinsons Place Antipolo

November 6
1:55 pm

Report

Meralco Bolts 3x3	12–9	NorthPort Batang Pier

Robinsons Place Antipolo

=== Knockout stage ===
TNT Tropang Giga defeated Platinum Karaoke in the finals, 17–15, to become the first leg winners.

==== Bracket ====
Quarterfinals
A1	J&T Express	19
C2	Cavitex Braves	22
D1	TNT Tropang Giga	20
B2	Purefoods TJ Titans	18
B1	Barangay Ginebra San Miguel	19
D2	San Miguel Beermen	18
C1	Platinum Karaoke	17
A2	Terrafirma 3x3	10

Semifinals
C2	Cavitex Braves	19
D1	TNT Tropang Giga	20
B1	Barangay Ginebra San Miguel	14
C1	Platinum Karaoke	18

Finals
D1	TNT Tropang Giga	17
C1	Platinum Karaoke	15
Third place
C2	Cavitex Braves	13
B1	Barangay Ginebra San Miguel	21

==== Quarterfinals ====
November 6
11:25 am

Report

J&T Express	19–22	Cavitex Braves

Robinsons Place Antipolo

November 6
11:50 am

Report

TNT Tropang Giga	20–18	Purefoods TJ Titans

Robinsons Place Antipolo

November 6
12:15 pm

Report

Barangay Ginebra San Miguel	19–18	San Miguel Beermen

Robinsons Place Antipolo

November 6
12:40 pm

Report

Platinum Karaoke	17–10	Terrafirma 3x3

Robinsons Place Antipolo

==== Semifinals ====
November 6
1:05 pm

Report

Cavitex Braves	19–20	TNT Tropang Giga

Robinsons Place Antipolo

November 6
1:30 pm

Report

Barangay Ginebra San Miguel	14–18	Platinum Karaoke

Robinsons Place Antipolo

==== Third place game ====
November 6
2:35 pm

Report

Cavitex Braves	13–21	Barangay Ginebra San Miguel

Robinsons Place Antipolo

==== Finals ====
November 6
3:00 pm

Report

TNT Tropang Giga	17–15	Platinum Karaoke

Robinsons Place Antipolo

=== Final standings ===
Pos	Team	Pld	W	L	PCT	AVG	PF	Tour points
1	TNT Tropang Giga	5	5	0	1.000	19.8	99	100
2	Platinum Karaoke	5	3	2	.600	17.2	86	80
3	Barangay Ginebra San Miguel	5	4	1	.800	19.2	96	70
4	Cavitex Braves	5	2	3	.400	17.0	85	60
Eliminated at the quarterfinals
5	J&T Express	3	2	1	.667	20.3	61	50
6	San Miguel Beermen	3	1	2	.333	18.7	56	45
7	Purefoods TJ Titans	3	1	2	.333	16.0	48	40
8	Terrafirma 3x3	3	1	2	.333	13.3	40	35
Winners of 9th–12th classification games
9	Blackwater Bossing Red President	3	2	1	.667	16.7	50	20
10	Meralco Bolts 3x3	3	1	2	.333	13.0	39	18
Losers of 9th–12th classification games
11	Pioneer ElastoSeal Katibays	3	0	3	.000	16.7	50	16
12	NorthPort Batang Pier	3	0	3	.000	8.3	25	14

Source: PBA 3x3

== 2nd leg ==
=== Groupings ===
Pool A	Pool B	Pool C	Pool D
TNT Tropang Giga (1); Terrafirma 3x3 (8); Blackwater Bossing Red President (9)	Platinum Karaoke (2); Purefoods TJ Titans (7); Meralco Bolts 3x3 (10)	Barangay Ginebra San Miguel (3); San Miguel Beermen (6); Pioneer ElastoSeal Katibays (11)	Cavitex Braves (4); J&T Express (5); NorthPort Batang Pier (12)

=== Preliminary round ===
==== Pool A ====
Pos	Team	Pld	W	L	PF	PA	PD	PCT	Qualification
1	Terrafirma 3x3	2	2	0	35	29	+6	1.000	Quarterfinals
2	TNT Tropang Giga	2	1	1	37	39	−2	.500	Quarterfinals
3	Blackwater Bossing Red President	2	0	2	31	35	−4	.000	9th–12th classification

Source: PBA 3x3
Rules for classification: 1) Wins; Win ratio if unequal number of games; 2) Head-to-head record; 3) Average points per game; 4) Higher seed.

November 12
11:00 am

Report

Terrafirma 3x3	14–13	Blackwater Bossing Red President

Robinsons Town Mall Malabon

November 12
12:40 pm

Report

TNT Tropang Giga	21–18	Blackwater Bossing Red President

Robinsons Town Mall Malabon

November 12
2:20 pm

Report

TNT Tropang Giga	16–21	Terrafirma 3x3

Robinsons Town Mall Malabon

==== Pool B ====
Pos	Team	Pld	W	L	PF	PA	PD	PCT	Qualification
1	Platinum Karaoke	2	2	0	33	23	+10	1.000	Quarterfinals
2	Purefoods TJ Titans	2	1	1	33	35	−2	.500	Quarterfinals
3	Meralco Bolts 3x3	2	0	2	31	39	−8	.000	9th–12th classification

Source: PBA 3x3
Rules for classification: 1) Wins; Win ratio if unequal number of games; 2) Head-to-head record; 3) Average points per game; 4) Higher seed.

November 12
11:25 am

Report

Purefoods TJ Titans	21–20	Meralco Bolts 3x3

Robinsons Town Mall Malabon

November 12
1:05 pm

Report

Platinum Karaoke	18–11	Meralco Bolts 3x3

Robinsons Town Mall Malabon

November 12
2:45 pm

Report

Platinum Karaoke	15–12	Purefoods TJ Titans

Robinsons Town Mall Malabon

==== Pool C ====
Pos	Team	Pld	W	L	PF	PA	PD	PCT	Qualification
1	Pioneer ElastoSeal Katibays	2	2	0	38	33	+5	1.000	Quarterfinals
2	Barangay Ginebra San Miguel	2	1	1	37	31	+6	.500	Quarterfinals
3	San Miguel Beermen	2	0	2	30	41	−11	.000	9th–12th classification

Source: PBA 3x3
Rules for classification: 1) Wins; Win ratio if unequal number of games; 2) Head-to-head record; 3) Average points per game; 4) Higher seed.

November 12
11:50 am

Report

Barangay Ginebra San Miguel	15–19	Pioneer ElastoSeal Katibays

Robinsons Town Mall Malabon

November 12
1:30 pm

Report

San Miguel Beermen	18–19	Pioneer ElastoSeal Katibays

Robinsons Town Mall Malabon

November 12
3:10 pm

Report

Barangay Ginebra San Miguel	22–12	San Miguel Beermen

Robinsons Town Mall Malabon

==== Pool D ====
Pos	Team	Pld	W	L	PF	PA	PD	PCT	Qualification
1	J&T Express	2	2	0	42	34	+8	1.000	Quarterfinals
2	Cavitex Braves	2	1	1	40	42	−2	.500	Quarterfinals
3	NorthPort Batang Pier	2	0	2	38	44	−6	.000	9th–12th classification

Source: PBA 3x3
Rules for classification: 1) Wins; Win ratio if unequal number of games; 2) Head-to-head record; 3) Average points per game; 4) Higher seed.

November 12
12:15 pm

Report

J&T Express	21–17	NorthPort Batang Pier

Robinsons Town Mall Malabon

November 12
1:55 pm

Report

Cavitex Braves	23–21	NorthPort Batang Pier

Robinsons Town Mall Malabon

November 12
3:35 pm

Report

Cavitex Braves	17–21	J&T Express

Robinsons Town Mall Malabon

=== Classification 9th–12th ===
November 13
11:00 am

Report

Blackwater Bossing Red President	21–20	San Miguel Beermen

Robinsons Town Mall Malabon

November 13
1:55 pm

Report

Meralco Bolts 3x3	22–12	NorthPort Batang Pier

Robinsons Town Mall Malabon

=== Knockout stage ===
J&T Express defeated TNT Tropang Giga in the finals, 21–19, to become the second leg winners.

==== Bracket ====
Quarterfinals
A1	Terrafirma 3x3	13
C2	Barangay Ginebra San Miguel	22
D1	J&T Express	21
B2	Purefoods TJ Titans	17
B1	Platinum Karaoke	16
D2	Cavitex Braves	18
C1	Pioneer ElastoSeal Katibays	19
A2	TNT Tropang Giga	20

Semifinals
C2	Barangay Ginebra San Miguel	18
D1	J&T Express	21
D2	Cavitex Braves	17
A2	TNT Tropang Giga	21

Finals
D1	J&T Express	21
A2	TNT Tropang Giga	19
Third place
C2	Barangay Ginebra San Miguel	12
D2	Cavitex Braves	16

==== Quarterfinals ====
November 13
11:25 am

Report

Terrafirma 3x3	13–22	Barangay Ginebra San Miguel

Robinsons Town Mall Malabon

November 13
11:50 am

Report

J&T Express	21–17	Purefoods TJ Titans

Robinsons Town Mall Malabon

November 13
12:15 pm

Report

Platinum Karaoke	16–18	Cavitex Braves

Robinsons Town Mall Malabon

November 13
12:40 pm

Report

Pioneer ElastoSeal Katibays	19–20	TNT Tropang Giga

Robinsons Town Mall Malabon

==== Semifinals ====
November 13
1:05 pm

Report

Barangay Ginebra San Miguel	18–21	J&T Express

Robinsons Town Mall Malabon

November 13
1:30 pm

Report

Cavitex Braves	17–21	TNT Tropang Giga

Robinsons Town Mall Malabon

==== Third place game ====
November 13
2:35 pm

Report

Barangay Ginebra San Miguel	12–16	Cavitex Braves

Robinsons Town Mall Malabon

==== Finals ====
November 13
3:00 pm

Report

J&T Express	21–19	TNT Tropang Giga

Robinsons Town Mall Malabon

=== Final standings ===
Pos	Team	Pld	W	L	PCT	AVG	PF	Tour points
1	J&T Express	5	5	0	1.000	21.0	105	100
2	TNT Tropang Giga	5	3	2	.600	19.4	97	80
3	Cavitex Braves	5	3	2	.600	18.2	91	70
4	Barangay Ginebra San Miguel	5	2	3	.400	17.8	89	60
Eliminated at the quarterfinals
5	Pioneer ElastoSeal Katibays	3	2	1	.667	19.0	57	50
6	Platinum Karaoke	3	2	1	.667	16.3	49	45
7	Terrafirma 3x3	3	2	1	.667	16.0	48	40
8	Purefoods TJ Titans	3	1	2	.333	16.7	50	35
Winners of 9th–12th classification games
9	Meralco Bolts 3x3	3	1	2	.333	17.7	53	20
10	Blackwater Bossing Red President	3	1	2	.333	17.3	52	18
Losers of 9th–12th classification games
11	San Miguel Beermen	3	0	3	.000	16.7	50	16
12	NorthPort Batang Pier	3	0	3	.000	16.7	50	14

Source: PBA 3x3

== 3rd leg ==
=== Groupings ===
Pool A	Pool B	Pool C	Pool D
J&T Express (1); Purefoods TJ Titans (8); Meralco Bolts 3x3 (9)	TNT Tropang Giga (2); Terrafirma 3x3 (7); Blackwater Bossing Red President (10)	Cavitex Braves (3); Platinum Karaoke (6); San Miguel Beermen (11)	Barangay Ginebra San Miguel (4); Pioneer ElastoSeal Katibays (5); NorthPort Batang Pier (12)

=== Preliminary round ===
==== Pool A ====
Pos	Team	Pld	W	L	PF	PA	PD	PCT	Qualification
1	J&T Express	2	2	0	42	31	+11	1.000	Quarterfinals
2	Meralco Bolts 3x3	2	1	1	30	37	−7	.500	Quarterfinals
3	Purefoods TJ Titans	2	0	2	35	39	−4	.000	9th–12th classification

Source: PBA 3x3
Rules for classification: 1) Wins; Win ratio if unequal number of games; 2) Head-to-head record; 3) Average points per game; 4) Higher seed.

November 19
11:00 am

Report

Purefoods TJ Titans	19–21	J&T Express

Robinsons Novaliches

November 19
12:40 pm

Report

Meralco Bolts 3x3	18–16	Purefoods TJ Titans

Robinsons Novaliches

November 19
2:20 pm

Report

J&T Express	21–12	Meralco Bolts 3x3

Robinsons Novaliches

==== Pool B ====
Pos	Team	Pld	W	L	PF	PA	PD	PCT	Qualification
1	TNT Tropang Giga	2	2	0	42	29	+13	1.000	Quarterfinals
2	Terrafirma 3x3	2	1	1	22	32	−10	.500	Quarterfinals
3	Blackwater Bossing Red President	2	0	2	30	33	−3	.000	9th–12th classification

Source: PBA 3x3
Rules for classification: 1) Wins; Win ratio if unequal number of games; 2) Head-to-head record; 3) Average points per game; 4) Higher seed.

November 19
11:25 am

Report

Blackwater Bossing Red President	19–21	TNT Tropang Giga

Robinsons Novaliches

November 19
1:05 pm

Report

TNT Tropang Giga	21–10	Terrafirma 3x3

Robinsons Novaliches

November 19
2:45 pm

Report

Terrafirma 3x3	12–11	Blackwater Bossing Red President

Robinsons Novaliches

==== Pool C ====
Pos	Team	Pld	W	L	PF	PA	PD	PCT	Qualification
1	Platinum Karaoke	2	2	0	38	33	+5	1.000	Quarterfinals
2	Cavitex Braves	2	1	1	35	32	+3	.500	Quarterfinals
3	San Miguel Beermen	2	0	2	34	42	−8	.000	9th–12th classification

Source: PBA 3x3
Rules for classification: 1) Wins; Win ratio if unequal number of games; 2) Head-to-head record; 3) Average points per game; 4) Higher seed.

November 19
11:50 am

Report

Platinum Karaoke	17–14	Cavitex Braves

Robinsons Novaliches

November 19
1:30 pm

Report

San Miguel Beermen	19–21	Platinum Karaoke

Robinsons Novaliches

November 19
3:10 pm

Report

Cavitex Braves	21–15	San Miguel Beermen

Robinsons Novaliches

==== Pool D ====
Pos	Team	Pld	W	L	PF	PA	PD	PCT	Qualification
1	Barangay Ginebra San Miguel	2	2	0	42	28	+14	1.000	Quarterfinals
2	NorthPort Batang Pier	2	1	1	33	39	−6	.500	Quarterfinals
3	Pioneer ElastoSeal Katibays	2	0	2	32	40	−8	.000	9th–12th classification

Source: PBA 3x3
Rules for classification: 1) Wins; Win ratio if unequal number of games; 2) Head-to-head record; 3) Average points per game; 4) Higher seed.

November 19
12:15 pm

Report

Pioneer ElastoSeal Katibays	14–21	Barangay Ginebra San Miguel

Robinsons Novaliches

November 19
1:55 pm

Report

NorthPort Batang Pier	19–18	Pioneer ElastoSeal Katibays

Robinsons Novaliches

November 19
3:35 pm

Report

Barangay Ginebra San Miguel	21–14	NorthPort Batang Pier

Robinsons Novaliches

=== Classification 9th–12th ===
November 20
11:00 am

Report

Purefoods TJ Titans	13–21	San Miguel Beermen

Robinsons Novaliches

November 20
1:55 pm

Report

Blackwater Bossing Red President	21–10	Pioneer ElastoSeal Katibays

Robinsons Novaliches

=== Knockout stage ===
TNT Tropang Giga defeated Cavitex Braves in the finals, 21–17, to become the third leg winners.

==== Bracket ====
Quarterfinals
A1	J&T Express	18
C2	Cavitex Braves	20
D1	Barangay Ginebra San Miguel	18
B2	Terrafirma 3x3	15
B1	TNT Tropang Giga	21
D2	NorthPort Batang Pier	18
C1	Platinum Karaoke	14
A2	Meralco Bolts 3x3	15

Semifinals
C2	Cavitex Braves	21
D1	Barangay Ginebra San Miguel	10
B1	TNT Tropang Giga	20
A2	Meralco Bolts 3x3	19

Finals
C2	Cavitex Braves	17
B1	TNT Tropang Giga	21
Third place
D1	Barangay Ginebra San Miguel	15
A2	Meralco Bolts 3x3	17

==== Quarterfinals ====
November 20
11:25 am

Report

J&T Express	18–20	Cavitex Braves

Robinsons Novaliches

November 20
11:50 am

Report

Barangay Ginebra San Miguel	18–15	Terrafirma 3x3

Robinsons Novaliches

November 20
12:15 pm

Report

TNT Tropang Giga	21–18	NorthPort Batang Pier

Robinsons Novaliches

November 20
12:40 pm

Report

Platinum Karaoke	14–15	Meralco Bolts 3x3

Robinsons Novaliches

==== Semifinals ====
November 20
1:05 pm

Report

Cavitex Braves	21–10	Barangay Ginebra San Miguel

Robinsons Novaliches

November 20
1:30 pm

Report

TNT Tropang Giga	20–19	Meralco Bolts 3x3

Robinsons Novaliches

==== Third place game ====
November 20
2:35 pm

Report

Barangay Ginebra San Miguel	15–17	Meralco Bolts 3x3

Robinsons Novaliches

==== Finals ====
November 20
3:00 pm

Report

Cavitex Braves	17–21	TNT Tropang Giga

Robinsons Novaliches

=== Final standings ===
Pos	Team	Pld	W	L	PCT	AVG	PF	Tour points
1	TNT Tropang Giga	5	5	0	1.000	20.8	104	100
2	Cavitex Braves	5	3	2	.600	18.6	93	80
3	Meralco Bolts 3x3	5	3	2	.333	16.2	81	70
4	Barangay Ginebra San Miguel	5	3	2	.600	17.0	85	60
Eliminated at the quarterfinals
5	J&T Express	3	2	1	.667	20.0	60	50
6	Platinum Karaoke	3	2	1	.667	17.3	52	45
7	NorthPort Batang Pier	3	1	2	.333	17.0	51	40
8	Terrafirma 3x3	3	1	2	.333	12.3	37	35
Winners of 9th–12th classification games
9	Blackwater Bossing Red President	3	1	2	.333	17.0	51	20
10	San Miguel Beermen	3	1	2	.333	18.3	55	18
Losers of 9th–12th classification games
11	Purefoods TJ Titans	3	0	3	.000	16.0	48	16
12	Pioneer ElastoSeal Katibays	3	0	3	.000	14.0	42	14

Source: PBA 3x3

== 4th leg ==
=== Groupings ===
Pool A	Pool B	Pool C	Pool D
TNT Tropang Giga (1); Terrafirma 3x3 (8); Blackwater Bossing Red President (9)	Cavitex Braves (2); NorthPort Batang Pier (7); San Miguel Beermen (10)	Meralco Bolts 3x3 (3); Platinum Karaoke (6); Purefoods TJ Titans (11)	Barangay Ginebra San Miguel (4); J&T Express (5); Pioneer ElastoSeal Katibays (12)

=== Preliminary round ===
==== Pool A ====
Pos	Team	Pld	W	L	PF	PA	PD	PCT	Qualification
1	TNT Tropang Giga	2	2	0	42	32	+10	1.000	Quarterfinals
2	Blackwater Bossing Red President	2	1	1	40	39	+1	.500	Quarterfinals
3	Terrafirma 3x3	2	0	2	31	42	−11	.000	9th–12th classification

Source: PBA 3x3
Rules for classification: 1) Wins; Win ratio if unequal number of games; 2) Head-to-head record; 3) Average points per game; 4) Higher seed.

November 26
11:00 am

Report

Blackwater Bossing Red President	21–18	Terrafirma 3x3

Robinsons Town Mall Malabon

November 26
12:40 pm

Report

TNT Tropang Giga	21–19	Blackwater Bossing Red President

Robinsons Town Mall Malabon

November 26
2:20 pm

Report

Terrafirma 3x3	13–21	TNT Tropang Giga

Robinsons Town Mall Malabon

==== Pool B ====
Pos	Team	Pld	W	L	PF	PA	PD	PCT	Qualification
1	Cavitex Braves	2	2	0	39	28	+11	1.000	Quarterfinals
2	NorthPort Batang Pier	2	1	1	33	36	−3	.500	Quarterfinals
3	San Miguel Beermen	2	0	2	34	42	−8	.000	9th–12th classification

Source: PBA 3x3
Rules for classification: 1) Wins; Win ratio if unequal number of games; 2) Head-to-head record; 3) Average points per game; 4) Higher seed.

November 26
11:25 am

Report

San Miguel Beermen	16–21	Cavitex Braves

Robinsons Town Mall Malabon

November 26
1:05 pm

Report

NorthPort Batang Pier	21–18	San Miguel Beermen

Robinsons Town Mall Malabon

November 26
2:45 pm

Report

Cavitex Braves	18–12	NorthPort Batang Pier

Robinsons Town Mall Malabon

==== Pool C ====
Pos	Team	Pld	W	L	PF	PA	PD	PCT	Qualification
1	Meralco Bolts 3x3	2	2	0	33	31	+2	1.000	Quarterfinals
2	Platinum Karaoke	2	1	1	38	29	+9	.500	Quarterfinals
3	Purefoods TJ Titans	2	0	2	25	36	−11	.000	9th–12th classification

Source: PBA 3x3
Rules for classification: 1) Wins; Win ratio if unequal number of games; 2) Head-to-head record; 3) Average points per game; 4) Higher seed.

November 26
11:50 am

Report

Platinum Karaoke	21–11	Purefoods TJ Titans

Robinsons Town Mall Malabon

November 26
1:30 pm

Report

Purefoods TJ Titans	14–15	Meralco Bolts 3x3

Robinsons Town Mall Malabon

November 26
3:10 pm

Report

Meralco Bolts 3x3	18–17	Platinum Karaoke

Robinsons Town Mall Malabon

==== Pool D ====
Pos	Team	Pld	W	L	PF	PA	PD	PCT	Qualification
1	J&T Express	2	2	0	40	31	+9	1.000	Quarterfinals
2	Barangay Ginebra San Miguel	2	1	1	37	30	+7	.500	Quarterfinals
3	Pioneer ElastoSeal Katibays	2	0	2	24	40	−16	.000	9th–12th classification

Source: PBA 3x3
Rules for classification: 1) Wins; Win ratio if unequal number of games; 2) Head-to-head record; 3) Average points per game; 4) Higher seed.

November 26
12:15 pm

Report

Barangay Ginebra San Miguel	16–21	J&T Express

Robinsons Town Mall Malabon

November 26
1:55 pm

Report

J&T Express	19–15	Pioneer ElastoSeal Katibays

Robinsons Town Mall Malabon

November 26
3:35 pm

Report

Pioneer ElastoSeal Katibays	9–21	Barangay Ginebra San Miguel

Robinsons Town Mall Malabon

=== Classification 9th–12th ===
November 27
11:00 am

Report

Terrafirma 3x3	19–21	Purefoods TJ Titans

Robinsons Town Mall Malabon

November 27
1:55 pm

Report

San Miguel Beermen	16–21	Pioneer ElastoSeal Katibays

Robinsons Town Mall Malabon

=== Knockout stage ===
Platinum Karaoke defeated Cavitex Braves in the finals, 13–12, to become the fourth leg winners.

==== Bracket ====
Quarterfinals
A1	TNT Tropang Giga	12
C2	Platinum Karaoke	13
D1	J&T Express	14
B2	NorthPort Batang Pier	9
B1	Cavitex Braves	18
D2	Barangay Ginebra San Miguel	12
C1	Meralco Bolts 3x3	16
A2	Blackwater Bossing Red President	18

Semifinals
C2	Platinum Karaoke	15
D1	J&T Express	13
B1	Cavitex Braves	21
A2	Blackwater Bossing Red President	19

Finals
C2	Platinum Karaoke	13
B1	Cavitex Braves	12
Third place
D1	J&T Express	22
A2	Blackwater Bossing Red President	20

==== Quarterfinals ====
November 27
11:25 am

Report

TNT Tropang Giga	12–13	Platinum Karaoke

Robinsons Town Mall Malabon

November 27
11:50 am

Report

J&T Express	14–9	NorthPort Batang Pier

Robinsons Town Mall Malabon

November 27
12:15 pm

Report

Cavitex Braves	18–12	Barangay Ginebra San Miguel

Robinsons Town Mall Malabon

November 27
12:40 pm

Report

Meralco Bolts 3x3	16–18	Blackwater Bossing Red President

Robinsons Town Mall Malabon

==== Semifinals ====
November 27
1:05 pm

Report

Platinum Karaoke	15–13	J&T Express

Robinsons Town Mall Malabon

November 27
1:30 pm

Report

Cavitex Braves	21–19	Blackwater Bossing Red President

Robinsons Town Mall Malabon

==== Third place game ====
November 27
2:35 pm

Report

J&T Express	22–20	Blackwater Bossing Red President

Robinsons Town Mall Malabon

==== Finals ====
November 27
3:00 pm

Report

Platinum Karaoke	13–12	Cavitex Braves

Robinsons Town Mall Malabon

=== Final standings ===
Pos	Team	Pld	W	L	PCT	AVG	PF	Tour points
1	Platinum Karaoke	5	4	1	.800	15.8	79	100
2	Cavitex Braves	5	4	1	.800	18.0	90	80
3	J&T Express	5	4	1	.800	17.8	89	70
4	Blackwater Bossing Red President	5	2	3	.400	19.4	97	60
Eliminated at the quarterfinals
5	TNT Tropang Giga	3	2	1	.667	18.0	54	50
6	Meralco Bolts 3x3	3	2	1	.667	16.3	49	45
7	Barangay Ginebra San Miguel	3	1	2	.333	16.3	49	40
8	NorthPort Batang Pier	3	1	2	.333	14.0	42	35
Winners of 9th–12th classification games
9	Pioneer ElastoSeal Katibays	3	1	2	.333	15.0	45	20
10	Purefoods TJ Titans	3	1	2	.333	15.3	46	18
Losers of 9th–12th classification games
11	Terrafirma 3x3	3	0	3	.000	16.7	50	16
12	San Miguel Beermen	3	0	3	.000	16.7	50	14

Source: PBA 3x3

== 5th leg ==
=== Groupings ===
Pool A	Pool B	Pool C	Pool D
Platinum Karaoke (1); NorthPort Batang Pier (8); Pioneer ElastoSeal Katibays (9)	Cavitex Braves (2); Barangay Ginebra San Miguel (7); Purefoods TJ Titans (10)	J&T Express (3); Meralco Bolts 3x3 (6); Terrafirma 3x3 (11)	Blackwater Bossing Red President (4); TNT Tropang Giga (5); San Miguel Beermen (12)

=== Preliminary round ===
==== Pool A ====
Pos	Team	Pld	W	L	PF	PA	PD	PCT	Qualification
1	Platinum Karaoke	2	2	0	40	31	+9	1.000	Quarterfinals
2	Pioneer ElastoSeal Katibays	2	1	1	38	33	+5	.500	Quarterfinals
3	NorthPort Batang Pier	2	0	2	28	42	−14	.000	9th–12th classification

Source: PBA 3x3
Rules for classification: 1) Wins; Win ratio if unequal number of games; 2) Head-to-head record; 3) Average points per game; 4) Higher seed.

December 3
11:00 am

Report

NorthPort Batang Pier	14–21	Pioneer ElastoSeal Katibays

Robinsons Novaliches

December 3
12:40 pm

Report

Pioneer ElastoSeal Katibays	17–19	Platinum Karaoke

Robinsons Novaliches

December 3
2:20 pm

Report

Platinum Karaoke	21–14	NorthPort Batang Pier

Robinsons Novaliches

==== Pool B ====
Pos	Team	Pld	W	L	PF	PA	PD	PCT	Qualification
1	Cavitex Braves	2	2	0	35	28	+7	1.000	Quarterfinals
2	Barangay Ginebra San Miguel	2	1	1	31	33	−2	.500	Quarterfinals
3	Purefoods TJ Titans	2	0	2	28	33	−5	.000	9th–12th classification

Source: PBA 3x3
Rules for classification: 1) Wins; Win ratio if unequal number of games; 2) Head-to-head record; 3) Average points per game; 4) Higher seed.

December 3
11:25 am

Report

Cavitex Braves	19–14	Barangay Ginebra San Miguel

Robinsons Novaliches

December 3
1:05 pm

Report

Barangay Ginebra San Miguel	17–14	Purefoods TJ Titans

Robinsons Novaliches

December 3
2:45 pm

Report

Purefoods TJ Titans	14–16	Cavitex Braves

Robinsons Novaliches

==== Pool C ====
Pos	Team	Pld	W	L	PF	PA	PD	PCT	Qualification
1	J&T Express	2	2	0	40	25	+15	1.000	Quarterfinals
2	Meralco Bolts 3x3	2	1	1	31	33	−2	.500	Quarterfinals
3	Terrafirma 3x3	2	0	2	24	37	−13	.000	9th–12th classification

Source: PBA 3x3
Rules for classification: 1) Wins; Win ratio if unequal number of games; 2) Head-to-head record; 3) Average points per game; 4) Higher seed.

December 3
11:50 am

Report

J&T Express	19–12	Terrafirma 3x3

Robinsons Novaliches

December 3
1:30 pm

Report

Terrafirma 3x3	12–18	Meralco Bolts 3x3

Robinsons Novaliches

December 3
3:10 pm

Report

Meralco Bolts 3x3	13–21	J&T Express

Robinsons Novaliches

==== Pool D ====
Pos	Team	Pld	W	L	PF	PA	PD	PCT	Qualification
1	San Miguel Beermen	2	2	0	42	35	+7	1.000	Quarterfinals
2	Blackwater Bossing Red President	2	1	1	36	40	−4	.500	Quarterfinals
3	TNT Tropang Giga	2	0	2	39	42	−3	.000	9th–12th classification

Source: PBA 3x3
Rules for classification: 1) Wins; Win ratio if unequal number of games; 2) Head-to-head record; 3) Average points per game; 4) Higher seed.

December 3
12:15 pm

Report

Blackwater Bossing Red President	15–21	San Miguel Beermen

Robinsons Novaliches

December 3
1:55 pm

Report

San Miguel Beermen	21–20	TNT Tropang Giga

Robinsons Novaliches

December 3
3:35 pm

Report

Blackwater Bossing Red President	21–19	TNT Tropang Giga

Robinsons Novaliches

=== Classification 9th–12th ===
December 4
11:00 am

Report

NorthPort Batang Pier	20–21	Terrafirma 3x3

Robinsons Novaliches

December 4
1:55 pm

Report

Purefoods TJ Titans	15–20	TNT Tropang Giga

Robinsons Novaliches

=== Knockout stage ===
Cavitex Braves defeated Platinum Karaoke in the finals, 21–13, to become the fifth leg winners.

==== Bracket ====
Quarterfinals
A1	Platinum Karaoke	17
C2	Meralco Bolts 3x3	15
D1	San Miguel Beermen	13
B2	Barangay Ginebra San Miguel	17
B1	Cavitex Braves	16
D2	Blackwater Bossing Red President	12
C1	J&T Express	15
A2	Pioneer ElastoSeal Katibays	17

Semifinals
A1	Platinum Karaoke	21
B2	Barangay Ginebra San Miguel	11
B1	Cavitex Braves	22
A2	Pioneer ElastoSeal Katibays	14

Finals
A1	Platinum Karaoke	13
B1	Cavitex Braves	21
Third place
B2	Barangay Ginebra San Miguel	14
A2	Pioneer ElastoSeal Katibays	17

==== Quarterfinals ====
December 4
11:25 am

Report

Platinum Karaoke	17–15	Meralco Bolts 3x3

Robinsons Novaliches

December 4
11:50 am

Report

San Miguel Beermen	13–17	Barangay Ginebra San Miguel

Robinsons Novaliches

December 4
12:15 pm

Report

Cavitex Braves	16–12	Blackwater Bossing Red President

Robinsons Novaliches

December 4
12:40 pm

Report

J&T Express	15–17	Pioneer ElastoSeal Katibays

Robinsons Novaliches

==== Semifinals ====
December 4
1:05 pm

Report

Platinum Karaoke	21–11	Barangay Ginebra San Miguel

Robinsons Novaliches

December 4
1:30 pm

Report

Cavitex Braves	22–14	Pioneer ElastoSeal Katibays

Robinsons Novaliches

==== Third place game ====
December 4
2:35 pm

Report

Barangay Ginebra San Miguel	14–17	Pioneer ElastoSeal Katibays

Robinsons Novaliches

==== Finals ====
December 4
3:00 pm

Report

Platinum Karaoke	13–21	Cavitex Braves

Robinsons Novaliches

=== Final standings ===
Pos	Team	Pld	W	L	PCT	AVG	PF	Tour points
1	Cavitex Braves	5	5	0	1.000	18.8	94	100
2	Platinum Karaoke	5	4	1	.800	18.2	91	80
3	Pioneer ElastoSeal Katibays	5	3	2	.600	17.2	86	70
4	Barangay Ginebra San Miguel	5	2	3	.400	14.6	73	60
Eliminated at the quarterfinals
5	J&T Express	3	2	1	.667	18.3	55	50
6	San Miguel Beermen	3	2	1	.667	18.3	55	45
7	Blackwater Bossing Red President	3	1	2	.333	16.0	48	40
8	Meralco Bolts 3x3	3	1	2	.333	15.3	46	35
Winners of 9th–12th classification games
9	TNT Tropang Giga	3	1	2	.333	19.7	59	20
10	Terrafirma 3x3	3	1	2	.333	15.0	45	18
Losers of 9th–12th classification games
11	NorthPort Batang Pier	3	0	3	.000	16.0	48	16
12	Purefoods TJ Titans	3	0	3	.000	14.3	43	14

Source: PBA 3x3

== 6th leg ==
=== Groupings ===
Pool A	Pool B	Pool C	Pool D
Cavitex Braves (1); Meralco Bolts 3x3 (8); TNT Tropang Giga (9)	Platinum Karaoke (2); Blackwater Bossing Red President (7); Terrafirma 3x3 (10)	Pioneer ElastoSeal Katibays (3); San Miguel Beermen (6); NorthPort Batang Pier (11)	Barangay Ginebra San Miguel (4); J&T Express (5); Purefoods TJ Titans (12)

=== Preliminary round ===
==== Pool A ====
Pos	Team	Pld	W	L	PF	PA	PD	PCT	Qualification
1	TNT Tropang Giga	2	2	0	42	33	+9	1.000	Quarterfinals
2	Cavitex Braves	2	1	1	41	40	+1	.500	Quarterfinals
3	Meralco Bolts 3x3	2	0	2	32	42	−10	.000	9th–12th classification

Source: PBA 3x3
Rules for classification: 1) Wins; Win ratio if unequal number of games; 2) Head-to-head record; 3) Average points per game; 4) Higher seed.

December 10
11:00 am

Report

Meralco Bolts 3x3	19–21	Cavitex Braves

Robinsons Place Antipolo

December 10
12:40 pm

Report

TNT Tropang Giga	21–20	Cavitex Braves

Robinsons Place Antipolo

December 10
2:20 pm

Report

Meralco Bolts 3x3	13–21	TNT Tropang Giga

Robinsons Place Antipolo

==== Pool B ====
Pos	Team	Pld	W	L	PF	PA	PD	PCT	Qualification
1	Blackwater Bossing Red President	2	2	0	42	25	+17	1.000	Quarterfinals
2	Platinum Karaoke	2	1	1	35	30	+5	.500	Quarterfinals
3	Terrafirma 3x3	2	0	2	19	41	−22	.000	9th–12th classification

Source: PBA 3x3
Rules for classification: 1) Wins; Win ratio if unequal number of games; 2) Head-to-head record; 3) Average points per game; 4) Higher seed.

December 10
11:25 am

Report

Blackwater Bossing Red President	20–11	Terrafirma 3x3

Robinsons Place Antipolo

December 10
1:05 pm

Report

Platinum Karaoke	14–22	Blackwater Bossing Red President

Robinsons Place Antipolo

December 10
2:45 pm

Report

Terrafirma 3x3	8–21	Platinum Karaoke

Robinsons Place Antipolo

==== Pool C ====
Pos	Team	Pld	W	L	PF	PA	PD	PCT	Qualification
1	San Miguel Beermen	2	2	0	39	33	+6	1.000	Quarterfinals
2	Pioneer ElastoSeal Katibays	2	1	1	37	36	+1	.500	Quarterfinals
3	NorthPort Batang Pier	2	0	2	31	38	−7	.000	9th–12th classification

Source: PBA 3x3
Rules for classification: 1) Wins; Win ratio if unequal number of games; 2) Head-to-head record; 3) Average points per game; 4) Higher seed.

December 10
11:50 am

Report

San Miguel Beermen	21–17	Pioneer ElastoSeal Katibays

Robinsons Place Antipolo

December 10
1:30 pm

Report

NorthPort Batang Pier	16–18	San Miguel Beermen

Robinsons Place Antipolo

December 10
3:10 pm

Report

Pioneer ElastoSeal Katibays	20–15	NorthPort Batang Pier

Robinsons Place Antipolo

==== Pool D ====
Pos	Team	Pld	W	L	PF	PA	PD	PCT	Qualification
1	Barangay Ginebra San Miguel	2	2	0	35	32	+3	1.000	Quarterfinals
2	J&T Express	2	1	1	39	40	−1	.500	Quarterfinals
3	Purefoods TJ Titans	2	0	2	32	34	−2	.000	9th–12th classification

Source: PBA 3x3
Rules for classification: 1) Wins; Win ratio if unequal number of games; 2) Head-to-head record; 3) Average points per game; 4) Higher seed.

December 10
12:15 pm

Report

Purefoods TJ Titans	19–20	J&T Express

Robinsons Place Antipolo

December 10
1:55 pm

Report

Barangay Ginebra San Miguel	14–13	Purefoods TJ Titans

Robinsons Place Antipolo

December 10
3:35 pm

Report

J&T Express	19–21	Barangay Ginebra San Miguel

Robinsons Place Antipolo

=== Classification 9th–12th ===
December 11
2:00 pm

Report

Meralco Bolts 3x3	16–15	NorthPort Batang Pier

Robinsons Place Antipolo

December 11
4:55 pm

Report

Terrafirma 3x3	19–16	Purefoods TJ Titans

Robinsons Place Antipolo

=== Knockout stage ===
Cavitex Braves defeated TNT Tropang Giga in the finals, 21–20, to become the sixth leg winners.

==== Bracket ====
Quarterfinals
A1	TNT Tropang Giga	22
C2	Pioneer ElastoSeal Katibays	11
D1	Barangay Ginebra San Miguel	13
B2	Platinum Karaoke	17
B1	Blackwater Bossing Red President	13
D2	J&T Express	21
C1	San Miguel Beermen	18
A2	Cavitex Braves	21

Semifinals
A1	TNT Tropang Giga	11
B2	Platinum Karaoke	8
D2	J&T Express	8
A2	Cavitex Braves	15

Finals
A1	TNT Tropang Giga	20
A2	Cavitex Braves	21
Third place
B2	Platinum Karaoke	17
D2	J&T Express	13

==== Quarterfinals ====
December 11
2:25 pm

Report

TNT Tropang Giga	22–11	Pioneer ElastoSeal Katibays

Robinsons Place Antipolo

December 11
2:50 pm

Report

Barangay Ginebra San Miguel	13–17	Platinum Karaoke

Robinsons Place Antipolo

December 11
3:15 pm

Report

Blackwater Bossing Red President	13–21	J&T Express

Robinsons Place Antipolo

December 11
3:40 pm

Report

San Miguel Beermen	18–21	Cavitex Braves

Robinsons Place Antipolo

==== Semifinals ====
December 11
4:05 pm

Report

TNT Tropang Giga	11–8	Platinum Karaoke

Robinsons Place Antipolo

December 11
4:30 pm

Report

J&T Express	8–15	Cavitex Braves

Robinsons Place Antipolo

==== Third place game ====
December 11
5:35 pm

Report

Platinum Karaoke	17–13	J&T Express

Robinsons Place Antipolo

==== Finals ====
December 11
6:00 pm

Report

TNT Tropang Giga	20–21	Cavitex Braves

Robinsons Place Antipolo

=== Final standings ===
Pos	Team	Pld	W	L	PCT	AVG	PF	Tour points
1	Cavitex Braves	5	4	1	.800	19.6	98	100
2	TNT Tropang Giga	5	4	1	.800	19.0	95	80
3	Platinum Karaoke	5	3	2	.600	15.4	77	70
4	J&T Express	5	2	3	.400	16.2	82	60
Eliminated at the quarterfinals
5	San Miguel Beermen	3	2	1	.667	19.0	57	50
6	Blackwater Bossing Red President	3	2	1	.667	18.3	55	45
7	Barangay Ginebra San Miguel	3	2	1	.667	16.0	48	40
8	Pioneer ElastoSeal Katibays	3	1	2	.333	16.0	48	35
Winners of 9th–12th classification games
9	Terrafirma 3x3	3	1	2	.333	12.7	38	20
10	Meralco Bolts 3x3	3	1	2	.333	16.0	48	18
Losers of 9th–12th classification games
11	Purefoods TJ Titans	3	0	3	.000	16.0	48	16
12	NorthPort Batang Pier	3	0	3	.000	15.3	46	14

Source: PBA 3x3

== Legs summary ==
Pos	Team	1st leg	2nd leg	3rd leg	4th leg	5th leg	6th leg	Pts	Qualification
1	Cavitex Braves	4th	3rd	2nd	2nd	1st	1st	490	Qualification to Grand Finals quarterfinal round
2	TNT Tropang Giga	1st	2nd	1st	5th	9th	2nd	430	Qualification to Grand Finals quarterfinal round
3	Platinum Karaoke	2nd	6th	6th	1st	2nd	3rd	420	Qualification to Grand Finals quarterfinal round
4	J&T Express	5th	1st	5th	3rd	5th	4th	380	Qualification to Grand Finals quarterfinal round
5	Barangay Ginebra San Miguel	3rd	4th	4th	7th	4th	7th	330	Qualification to Grand Finals preliminary round
6	Meralco Bolts 3x3	10th	9th	3rd	6th	8th	10th	206	Qualification to Grand Finals preliminary round
7	Pioneer ElastoSeal Katibays	11th	5th	12th	9th	3rd	8th	205	Qualification to Grand Finals preliminary round
8	Blackwater Bossing Red President	9th	10th	9th	4th	7th	6th	203	Qualification to Grand Finals preliminary round
9	San Miguel Beermen	6th	11th	10th	12th	6th	5th	188	Qualification to Grand Finals preliminary round
10	Terrafirma 3x3	8th	7th	8th	11th	10th	9th	164	Qualification to Grand Finals preliminary round
11	Purefoods TJ Titans	7th	8th	11th	10th	12th	11th	139	
12	NorthPort Batang Pier	12th	12th	7th	8th	11th	12th	133	

Source: PBA 3x3 Report

== Grand Finals ==
=== Preliminary round ===
==== Pool A ====
Pos	Team	Pld	W	L	PF	PA	PD	PCT	Qualification
1	Blackwater Bossing Red President	2	2	0	40	35	+5	1.000	Quarterfinals
2	Barangay Ginebra San Miguel	2	1	1	36	36	0	.500	Quarterfinals
3	San Miguel Beermen	2	0	2	37	42	−5	.000	

Source: PBA 3x3
Rules for classification: 1) Wins; Win ratio if unequal number of games; 2) Head-to-head record; 3) Average points per game; 4) Higher seed.

December 17
2:00 pm

Report

Blackwater Bossing Red President	21–20	San Miguel Beermen

Robinsons Town Mall Malabon

December 17
2:50 pm

Report

San Miguel Beermen	17–21	Barangay Ginebra San Miguel

Robinsons Town Mall Malabon

December 17
3:40 pm

Report

Barangay Ginebra San Miguel	15–19	Blackwater Bossing Red President

Robinsons Town Mall Malabon

==== Pool B ====
Pos	Team	Pld	W	L	PF	PA	PD	PCT	Qualification
1	Pioneer ElastoSeal Katibays	2	2	0	40	34	+6	1.000	Quarterfinals
2	Meralco Bolts 3x3	2	1	1	38	28	+10	.500	Quarterfinals
3	Terrafirma 3x3	2	0	2	26	42	−16	.000	

Source: PBA 3x3
Rules for classification: 1) Wins; Win ratio if unequal number of games; 2) Head-to-head record; 3) Average points per game; 4) Higher seed.

December 17
2:25 pm

Report

Pioneer ElastoSeal Katibays	21–17	Terrafirma 3x3

Robinsons Town Mall Malabon

December 17
3:15 pm

Report

Terrafirma 3x3	9–21	Meralco Bolts 3x3

Robinsons Town Mall Malabon

December 17
4:05 pm

Report

Meralco Bolts 3x3	17–19	Pioneer ElastoSeal Katibays

Robinsons Town Mall Malabon

=== Knockout stage ===
==== Bracket ====
Seed refers to the position of the team after six legs. Letter and number inside parentheses denotes the pool letter and pool position of the team, respectively, after the preliminary round of the Grand Finals.

Quarterfinals
1	Cavitex Braves	21
6 (B2)	Meralco Bolts 3x3	20
8 (A1)	Blackwater Bossing Red President	11
4	J&T Express	18
5 (A2)	Barangay Ginebra San Miguel	16
2	TNT Tropang Giga	20
3	Platinum Karaoke	14
7 (B1)	Pioneer ElastoSeal Katibays	13

Semifinals
1	Cavitex Braves	16
4	J&T Express	10
2	TNT Tropang Giga	18
3	Platinum Karaoke	13

Finals
1	Cavitex Braves	17
2	TNT Tropang Giga	19
Third place
4	J&T Express	20
3	Platinum Karaoke	14

==== Quarterfinals ====
December 17
4:30 pm

Report

Blackwater Bossing Red President	11–18	J&T Express

Robinsons Town Mall Malabon

December 17
4:55 pm

Report

Cavitex Braves	21–20	Meralco Bolts 3x3

Robinsons Town Mall Malabon

December 17
5:20 pm

Report

Barangay Ginebra San Miguel	16–20	TNT Tropang Giga

Robinsons Town Mall Malabon

December 17
5:45 pm

Report

Platinum Karaoke	14–13	Pioneer ElastoSeal Katibays

Robinsons Town Mall Malabon

==== Semifinals ====
December 17
6:35 pm

Report

Cavitex Braves	16–10	J&T Express

Robinsons Town Mall Malabon

December 17
7:00 pm

Report

TNT Tropang Giga	18–13	Platinum Karaoke

Robinsons Town Mall Malabon

==== Third place game ====
December 17
7:40 pm

Report

J&T Express	20–14	Platinum Karaoke

Robinsons Town Mall Malabon

==== Finals ====
December 17
8:05 pm

Report

Cavitex Braves	17–19	TNT Tropang Giga

Robinsons Town Mall Malabon
