= 2022–23 PBA 3x3 season – First conference =

First conference of the 2022–23 PBA 3x3 season

The first conference of the 2022–23 PBA 3x3 season started on September 10 and ended on October 30, 2022. It consisted of six two-day legs and a grand final. TNT Tropang Giga became the conference's Grand Champion after defeating Platinum Karaoke in the Grand Finals, 20–17.

== Teams ==
The players listed have played in at least one of the legs.

Team	Players					
Barangay Ginebra San Miguel	Clark Bautista	Ralph Cu	James Mangahas	Dennice Villamor	Mikey Cabahug	Ralph Salcedo
Blackwater Bossing Red President	Richard Escoto	Jeff Javillonar	Prince Rivero	Alfrancis Tamsi	Hubert Cani	Maclean Sabellina
Cavitex Braves	Bong Galanza	Jorey Napoles	Chester Saldua	Tzaddy Rangel	Dominick Fajardo	
J&T Express	Keith Datu	Marvin Hayes	Robin Roño	Joseph Sedurifa	Jeric Teng	
Meralco Bolts 3x3	Alfred Batino	Leo de Vera	Tonino Gonzaga	Kenneth Mocon	Reymar Caduyac	Joseph Manlangit
NorthPort Batang Pier	Wilson Baltazar	Luke Parcero	LA Revilla	Dexter Zamora	Gwyne Capacio	Patrick Jamison
Pioneer ElastoSeal Katibays	Gian Abrigo	Carlo Escalambre	Reggie Morido	Christian Rivera	Clint Doliguez	Reeve Ugsang
Platinum Karaoke	Yutien Andrada	Nico Salva	Yves Sazon	Terrence Tumalip	Brandon Bates	Raphael Banal
Purefoods TJ Titans	JR Alabanza	Chris de Chavez	Ronnie de Leon	Joseph Eriobu	Nichole Ubalde	
San Miguel Beermen	Ken Bono	Wendell Comboy	Jeff Manday	Raffy Verano	Alfonzo Gotladera	
Terrafirma 3x3	Shaq Alanes	Jebb Bulawan	Red Cachuela	Jeremiah Taladua	Sandy Ceñal	Bryan Santos
TNT Tropang Giga	Samboy de Leon	Chris Exciminiano	Lervin Flores	Almond Vosotros	Gryann Mendoza	Rey Mark Acuno

== 1st leg ==
=== Groupings ===
Pool A	Pool B	Pool C	Pool D
Cavitex Braves; Pioneer ElastoSeal Katibays; TNT Tropang Giga	Barangay Ginebra San Miguel; Meralco Bolts 3x3 NorthPort Batang Pier	Blackwater Bossing Red President; Platinum Karaoke; Terrafirma 3x3	J&T Express; Purefoods TJ Titans; San Miguel Beermen

=== Preliminary round ===
==== Pool A ====
Pos	Team	Pld	W	L	PF	PA	PD	PCT	Qualification
1	TNT Tropang Giga	2	2	0	41	33	+8	1.000	Quarterfinals
2	Pioneer ElastoSeal Katibays	2	1	1	29	35	−6	.500	Quarterfinals
3	Cavitex Braves	2	0	2	33	35	−2	.000	9th–12th classification

Source: PBA 3x3
Rules for classification: 1) Wins; Win ratio if unequal number of games; 2) Head-to-head record; 3) Average points per game; 4) Higher seed.

September 10
11:00 am

Report

Pioneer ElastoSeal Katibays	15–14	Cavitex Braves

Robinsons Manila

September 10
12:40 pm

Report

TNT Tropang Giga	21–14	Pioneer ElastoSeal Katibays

Robinsons Manila

September 10
2:20 pm

Report

TNT Tropang Giga	20–19	Cavitex Braves

Robinsons Manila

==== Pool B ====
Pos	Team	Pld	W	L	PF	PA	PD	PCT	Qualification
1	Meralco Bolts 3x3	2	2	0	41	25	+16	1.000	Quarterfinals
2	NorthPort Batang Pier	2	1	1	30	33	−3	.500	Quarterfinals
3	Barangay Ginebra San Miguel	2	0	2	26	39	−13	.000	9th–12th classification

Source: PBA 3x3
Rules for classification: 1) Wins; Win ratio if unequal number of games; 2) Head-to-head record; 3) Average points per game; 4) Higher seed.

September 10
11:25 am

Report

Barangay Ginebra San Miguel	12–19	NorthPort Batang Pier

Robinsons Manila

September 10
1:05 pm

Report

Meralco Bolts 3x3	20–14	Barangay Ginebra San Miguel

Robinsons Manila

September 10
2:45 pm

Report

Meralco Bolts 3x3	21–11	NorthPort Batang Pier

Robinsons Manila

==== Pool C ====
Pos	Team	Pld	W	L	PF	PA	PD	PCT	Qualification
1	Platinum Karaoke	2	2	0	40	31	+9	1.000	Quarterfinals
2	Blackwater Bossing Red President	2	1	1	35	32	+3	.500	Quarterfinals
3	Terrafirma 3x3	2	0	2	26	38	−12	.000	9th–12th classification

Source: PBA 3x3
Rules for classification: 1) Wins; Win ratio if unequal number of games; 2) Head-to-head record; 3) Average points per game; 4) Higher seed.

September 10
11:50 am

Report

Platinum Karaoke	19–15	Terrafirma 3x3

Robinsons Manila

September 10
1:30 pm

Report

Platinum Karaoke	21–16	Blackwater Bossing Red President

Robinsons Manila

September 10
3:10 pm

Report

Terrafirma 3x3	11–19	Blackwater Bossing Red President

Robinsons Manila

==== Pool D ====
Pos	Team	Pld	W	L	PF	PA	PD	PCT	Qualification
1	J&T Express	2	2	0	42	23	+19	1.000	Quarterfinals
2	Purefoods TJ Titans	2	1	1	32	37	−5	.500	Quarterfinals
3	San Miguel Beermen	2	0	2	28	42	−14	.000	9th–12th classification

Source: PBA 3x3
Rules for classification: 1) Wins; Win ratio if unequal number of games; 2) Head-to-head record; 3) Average points per game; 4) Higher seed.

September 10
12:15 pm

Report

Purefoods TJ Titans	11–21	J&T Express

Robinsons Manila

September 10
1:55 pm

Report

San Miguel Beermen	12–21	J&T Express

Robinsons Manila

September 10
3:35 pm

Report

San Miguel Beermen	16–21	Purefoods TJ Titans

Robinsons Manila

=== Classification 9th–12th ===
September 11
11:00 am

Report

Cavitex Braves	21–6	Terrafirma 3x3

Robinsons Manila

September 11
11:25 am

Report

Barangay Ginebra San Miguel	17–19	San Miguel Beermen

Robinsons Manila

=== Knockout stage ===
TNT Tropang Giga defeated Meralco Bolts 3x3 in the finals, 21–19, to become the first leg winners.

==== Bracket ====
Quarterfinals
A1	TNT Tropang Giga	18
C2	Blackwater Bossing Red President	16
D1	J&T Express	19
B2	NorthPort Batang Pier	13
B1	Meralco Bolts 3x3	16
D2	Purefoods TJ Titans	11
C1	Platinum Karaoke	20
A2	Pioneer ElastoSeal Katibays	15

Semifinals
A1	TNT Tropang Giga	18
D1	J&T Express	15
B1	Meralco Bolts 3x3	18
C1	Platinum Karaoke	16

Finals
A1	TNT Tropang Giga	21
B1	Meralco Bolts 3x3	19
Third place
D1	J&T Express	10
C1	Platinum Karaoke	12

==== Quarterfinals ====
September 11
11:50 am

Report

TNT Tropang Giga	18–16	Blackwater Bossing Red President

Robinsons Manila

September 11
12:15 pm

Report

J&T Express	19–13	NorthPort Batang Pier

Robinsons Manila

September 11
12:40 pm

Report

Meralco Bolts 3x3	16–11	Purefoods TJ Titans

Robinsons Manila

September 11
1:05 pm

Report

Platinum Karaoke	20–15	Pioneer ElastoSeal Katibays

Robinsons Manila

==== Semifinals ====
September 11
1:30 pm

Report

TNT Tropang Giga	18–15	J&T Express

Robinsons Manila

September 11
1:55 pm

Report

Meralco Bolts 3x3	18–16	Platinum Karaoke

Robinsons Manila

==== Third place game ====
September 11
2:35 pm

Report

J&T Express	10–12	Platinum Karaoke

Robinsons Manila

==== Finals ====
September 11
3:00 pm

Report

TNT Tropang Giga	21–19	Meralco Bolts 3x3

Robinsons Manila

=== Final standings ===
Pos	Team	Pld	W	L	PCT	AVG	PF	Tour points
1	TNT Tropang Giga	5	5	0	1.000	19.6	98	100
2	Meralco Bolts 3x3	5	4	1	.800	18.8	94	80
3	Platinum Karaoke	5	4	1	.800	17.6	88	70
4	J&T Express	5	3	2	.600	17.2	86	60
Eliminated at the quarterfinals
5	Blackwater Bossing Red President	3	1	2	.333	17.0	51	50
6	Pioneer ElastoSeal Katibays	3	1	2	.333	14.7	44	45
7	NorthPort Batang Pier	3	1	2	.333	14.3	43	40
8	Purefoods TJ Titans	3	1	2	.333	14.3	43	35
Winners of 9th–12th classification games
9	Cavitex Braves	3	1	2	.333	18.0	54	20
10	San Miguel Beermen	3	1	2	.333	15.7	47	18
Losers of 9th–12th classification games
11	Barangay Ginebra San Miguel	3	0	3	.000	14.3	43	16
12	Terrafirma 3x3	3	0	3	.000	10.7	32	14

Source: PBA 3x3

== 2nd leg ==
=== Groupings ===
Pool A	Pool B	Pool C	Pool D
TNT Tropang Giga (1); Purefoods TJ Titans (8); Cavitex Braves (9)	Meralco Bolts 3x3 (2); NorthPort Batang Pier (7); San Miguel Beermen (10)	Platinum Karaoke (3); Pioneer ElastoSeal Katibays (6); Barangay Ginebra San Miguel (11)	J&T Express (4); Blackwater Bossing Red President (5); Terrafirma 3x3 (12)

=== Preliminary round ===
==== Pool A ====
Pos	Team	Pld	W	L	PF	PA	PD	PCT	Qualification
1	TNT Tropang Giga	2	2	0	39	34	+5	1.000	Quarterfinals
2	Cavitex Braves	2	1	1	32	33	−1	.500	Quarterfinals
3	Purefoods TJ Titans	2	0	2	37	41	−4	.000	9th–12th classification

Source: PBA 3x3
Rules for classification: 1) Wins; Win ratio if unequal number of games; 2) Head-to-head record; 3) Average points per game; 4) Higher seed.

September 17
11:00 am

Report

Purefoods TJ Titans	16–19	Cavitex Braves

Robinsons Novaliches

September 17
12:40 pm

Report

TNT Tropang Giga	22–21	Purefoods TJ Titans

Robinsons Novaliches

September 17
2:20 pm

Report

TNT Tropang Giga	17–13	Cavitex Braves

Robinsons Novaliches

==== Pool B ====
Pos	Team	Pld	W	L	PF	PA	PD	PCT	Qualification
1	Meralco Bolts 3x3	2	2	0	35	29	+6	1.000	Quarterfinals
2	San Miguel Beermen	2	1	1	35	30	+5	.500	Quarterfinals
3	NorthPort Batang Pier	2	0	2	26	37	−11	.000	9th–12th classification

Source: PBA 3x3
Rules for classification: 1) Wins; Win ratio if unequal number of games; 2) Head-to-head record; 3) Average points per game; 4) Higher seed.

September 17
11:25 am

Report

NorthPort Batang Pier	11–21	San Miguel Beermen

Robinsons Novaliches

September 17
1:05 pm

Report

Meralco Bolts 3x3	19–14	San Miguel Beermen

Robinsons Novaliches

September 17
2:45 pm

Report

Meralco Bolts 3x3	16–15	NorthPort Batang Pier

Robinsons Novaliches

==== Pool C ====
Pos	Team	Pld	W	L	PF	PA	PD	PCT	Qualification
1	Platinum Karaoke	2	2	0	36	32	+4	1.000	Quarterfinals
2	Pioneer ElastoSeal Katibays	2	1	1	28	29	−1	.500	Quarterfinals
3	Barangay Ginebra San Miguel	2	0	2	31	34	−3	.000	9th–12th classification

Source: PBA 3x3
Rules for classification: 1) Wins; Win ratio if unequal number of games; 2) Head-to-head record; 3) Average points per game; 4) Higher seed.

September 17
11:50 am

Report

Platinum Karaoke	20–18	Barangay Ginebra San Miguel

Robinsons Novaliches

September 17
1:30 pm

Report

Platinum Karaoke	16–14	Pioneer ElastoSeal Katibays

Robinsons Novaliches

September 17
3:10 pm

Report

Pioneer ElastoSeal Katibays	14–13	Barangay Ginebra San Miguel

Robinsons Novaliches

==== Pool D ====
Pos	Team	Pld	W	L	PF	PA	PD	PCT	Qualification
1	J&T Express	2	2	0	36	31	+5	1.000	Quarterfinals
2	Blackwater Bossing Red President	2	1	1	39	38	+1	.500	Quarterfinals
3	Terrafirma 3x3	2	0	2	32	38	−6	.000	9th–12th classification

Source: PBA 3x3
Rules for classification: 1) Wins; Win ratio if unequal number of games; 2) Head-to-head record; 3) Average points per game; 4) Higher seed.

September 17
12:15 pm

Report

J&T Express	19–18	Blackwater Bossing Red President

Robinsons Novaliches

September 17
1:55 pm

Report

J&T Express	17–13	Terrafirma 3x3

Robinsons Novaliches

September 17
3:35 pm

Report

Blackwater Bossing Red President	21–19	Terrafirma 3x3

Robinsons Novaliches

=== Classification 9th–12th ===
September 18
11:00 am

Report

Purefoods TJ Titans	15–20	Barangay Ginebra San Miguel

Robinsons Novaliches

September 18
11:25 am

Report

NorthPort Batang Pier	17–21	Terrafirma 3x3

Robinsons Novaliches

=== Knockout stage ===
Cavitex Braves defeated San Miguel Beermen in the finals, 21–19, to become the second leg winners.

==== Bracket ====
Quarterfinals
A1	TNT Tropang Giga	14
C2	Pioneer ElastoSeal Katibays	13
D1	J&T Express	15
B2	San Miguel Beermen	17
B1	Meralco Bolts 3x3	21
D2	Blackwater Bossing Red President	17
C1	Platinum Karaoke	12
A2	Cavitex Braves	14

Semifinals
A1	TNT Tropang Giga	14
B2	San Miguel Beermen	21
B1	Meralco Bolts 3x3	16
A2	Cavitex Braves	17

Finals
B2	San Miguel Beermen	19
A2	Cavitex Braves	21
Third place
A1	TNT Tropang Giga	20
B1	Meralco Bolts 3x3	17

==== Quarterfinals ====
September 18
11:50 am

Report

TNT Tropang Giga	14–13	Pioneer ElastoSeal Katibays

Robinsons Novaliches

September 18
12:15 pm

Report

J&T Express	15–17	San Miguel Beermen

Robinsons Novaliches

September 18
12:40 pm

Report

Meralco Bolts 3x3	21–17	Blackwater Bossing Red President

Robinsons Novaliches

September 18
1:05 pm

Report

Platinum Karaoke	12–14	Cavitex Braves

Robinsons Novaliches

==== Semifinals ====
September 18
1:30 pm

Report

TNT Tropang Giga	14–21	San Miguel Beermen

Robinsons Novaliches

September 18
1:55 pm

Report

Meralco Bolts 3x3	16–17	Cavitex Braves

Robinsons Novaliches

==== Third place game ====
September 18
2:35 pm

Report

TNT Tropang Giga	20–17	Meralco Bolts 3x3

Robinsons Novaliches

==== Finals ====
September 18
3:00 pm

Report

San Miguel Beermen	19–21	Cavitex Braves

Robinsons Novaliches

=== Final standings ===
Pos	Team	Pld	W	L	PCT	AVG	PF	Tour points
1	Cavitex Braves	5	4	1	.800	16.8	84	100
2	San Miguel Beermen	5	3	2	.600	18.4	92	80
3	TNT Tropang Giga	5	4	1	.800	17.4	87	70
4	Meralco Bolts 3x3	5	3	2	.600	17.8	89	60
Eliminated at the quarterfinals
5	J&T Express	3	2	1	.667	17.0	51	50
6	Platinum Karaoke	3	2	1	.667	16.0	48	45
7	Blackwater Bossing Red President	3	1	2	.333	18.7	56	40
8	Pioneer ElastoSeal Katibays	3	1	2	.333	13.7	41	35
Winners of 9th–12th classification games
9	Terrafirma 3x3	3	1	2	.333	17.7	53	20
10	Barangay Ginebra San Miguel	3	1	2	.333	17.0	51	18
Losers of 9th–12th classification games
11	NorthPort Batang Pier	3	0	3	.000	14.3	43	16
12	Purefoods TJ Titans	3	0	3	.000	17.3	52	14

Source: PBA 3x3

== 3rd leg ==
The games were initially scheduled to be held on September 26 and 27, 2022 at Robinsons Place Antipolo, but was postponed due to Super Typhoon Karding. The leg was rescheduled to October 1 and 2, with the games being moved to Robinsons Las Piñas.

=== Groupings ===
Pool A	Pool B	Pool C	Pool D
Cavitex Braves (1); Pioneer ElastoSeal Katibays (8); Terrafirma 3x3 (9)	San Miguel Beermen (2); Blackwater Bossing Red President (7); Barangay Ginebra San Miguel (10)	TNT Tropang Giga (3); Platinum Karaoke (6); NorthPort Batang Pier (11)	Meralco Bolts 3x3 (4); J&T Express (5); Purefoods TJ Titans (12)

=== Preliminary round ===
==== Pool A ====
Pos	Team	Pld	W	L	PF	PA	PD	PCT	Qualification
1	Pioneer ElastoSeal Katibays	2	2	0	35	32	+3	1.000	Quarterfinals
2	Cavitex Braves	2	1	1	36	36	0	.500	Quarterfinals
3	Terrafirma 3x3	2	0	2	37	40	−3	.000	9th–12th classification

Source: PBA 3x3
Rules for classification: 1) Wins; Win ratio if unequal number of games; 2) Head-to-head record; 3) Average points per game; 4) Higher seed.

October 1
11:00 am

Report

Cavitex Braves	21–20	Terrafirma 3x3

Robinsons Las Piñas

October 1
12:40 pm

Report

Cavitex Braves	15–16	Pioneer ElastoSeal Katibays

Robinsons Las Piñas

October 1
2:20 pm

Report

Pioneer ElastoSeal Katibays	19–17	Terrafirma 3x3

Robinsons Las Piñas

==== Pool B ====
Pos	Team	Pld	W	L	PF	PA	PD	PCT	Qualification
1	San Miguel Beermen	2	2	0	42	26	+16	1.000	Quarterfinals
2	Barangay Ginebra San Miguel	2	1	1	32	38	−6	.500	Quarterfinals
3	Blackwater Bossing Red President	2	0	2	29	39	−10	.000	9th–12th classification

Source: PBA 3x3
Rules for classification: 1) Wins; Win ratio if unequal number of games; 2) Head-to-head record; 3) Average points per game; 4) Higher seed.

October 1
11:25 am

Report

San Miguel Beermen	21–14	Barangay Ginebra San Miguel

Robinsons Las Piñas

October 1
1:05 pm

Report

Blackwater Bossing Red President	17–18	Barangay Ginebra San Miguel

Robinsons Las Piñas

October 1
2:45 pm

Report

San Miguel Beermen	21–12	Blackwater Bossing Red President

Robinsons Las Piñas

==== Pool C ====
Pos	Team	Pld	W	L	PF	PA	PD	PCT	Qualification
1	Platinum Karaoke	2	2	0	44	38	+6	1.000	Quarterfinals
2	TNT Tropang Giga	2	1	1	36	40	−4	.500	Quarterfinals
3	NorthPort Batang Pier	2	0	2	39	41	−2	.000	9th–12th classification

Source: PBA 3x3
Rules for classification: 1) Wins; Win ratio if unequal number of games; 2) Head-to-head record; 3) Average points per game; 4) Higher seed.

October 1
11:50 am

Report

TNT Tropang Giga	17–22	Platinum Karaoke

Robinsons Las Piñas

October 1
1:30 pm

Report

TNT Tropang Giga	19–18	NorthPort Batang Pier

Robinsons Las Piñas

October 1
3:10 pm

Report

Platinum Karaoke	22–21	NorthPort Batang Pier

Robinsons Las Piñas

==== Pool D ====
Pos	Team	Pld	W	L	PF	PA	PD	PCT	Qualification
1	Meralco Bolts 3x3	2	2	0	16	15	+1	1.000	Quarterfinals
2	J&T Express	2	1	1	36	27	+9	.500	Quarterfinals
3	Purefoods TJ Titans	2	0	2	11	21	−10	.000	9th–12th classification

Source: PBA 3x3
Rules for classification: 1) Wins; Win ratio if unequal number of games; 2) Head-to-head record; 3) Average points per game; 4) Higher seed.

October 1
12:15 pm

Report

J&T Express	21–11	Purefoods TJ Titans

Robinsons Las Piñas

October 1
1:55 pm

Report

Meralco Bolts 3x3	W–0	Purefoods TJ Titans

Robinsons Las Piñas

October 1
3:35 pm

Report

Meralco Bolts 3x3	16–15	J&T Express

Robinsons Las Piñas

=== Classification 9th–12th ===
October 2
11:00 am

Report

Terrafirma 3x3	15–21	NorthPort Batang Pier

Robinsons Las Piñas

October 2
1:55 pm

Report

Purefoods TJ Titans	17–20	Blackwater Bossing Red President

Robinsons Las Piñas

=== Knockout stage ===
Meralco Bolts 3x3 defeated J&T Express in the finals, 21–19, to become the third leg winners.

==== Bracket ====
Quarterfinals
A1	Pioneer ElastoSeal Katibays	17
C2	TNT Tropang Giga	21
D1	Meralco Bolts 3x3	15
B2	Barangay Ginebra San Miguel	13
B1	San Miguel Beermen	16
D2	J&T Express	20
C1	Platinum Karaoke	14
A2	Cavitex Braves	20

Semifinals
C2	TNT Tropang Giga	15
D1	Meralco Bolts 3x3	16
D2	J&T Express	18
A2	Cavitex Braves	17

Finals
D1	Meralco Bolts 3x3	19
D2	J&T Express	14
Third place
C2	TNT Tropang Giga	13
A2	Cavitex Braves	21

==== Quarterfinals ====
October 2
11:25 am

Report

Pioneer ElastoSeal Katibays	17–21	TNT Tropang Giga

Robinsons Las Piñas

October 2
11:50 am

Report

Meralco Bolts 3x3	15–13	Barangay Ginebra San Miguel

Robinsons Las Piñas

October 2
12:15 pm

Report

San Miguel Beermen	16–20	J&T Express

Robinsons Las Piñas

October 2
12:40 pm

Report

Platinum Karaoke	14–20	Cavitex Braves

Robinsons Las Piñas

==== Semifinals ====
October 2
1:05 pm

Report

TNT Tropang Giga	15–16	Meralco Bolts 3x3

Robinsons Las Piñas

October 2
1:30 pm

Report

J&T Express	18–17	Cavitex Braves

Robinsons Las Piñas

==== Third place game ====
October 2
2:20 pm

Report

TNT Tropang Giga	13–21	Cavitex Braves

Robinsons Las Piñas

==== Finals ====
October 2
2:45 pm

Report

Meralco Bolts 3x3	19–14	J&T Express

Robinsons Las Piñas

=== Final standings ===
Pos	Team	Pld	W	L	PCT	AVG	PF	Tour points
1	Meralco Bolts 3x3	5	5	0	1.000	16.5 (Note: Per FIBA 3x3 Rules Article 20.2.1, the results of a forfeited game shall not be considered when calculating the winning team's average score.)	66	100
2	J&T Express	5	3	2	.600	17.6	88	80
3	Cavitex Braves	5	3	2	.600	18.8	94	70
4	TNT Tropang Giga	5	2	3	.800	17.0	85	60
Eliminated at the quarterfinals
5	San Miguel Beermen	3	2	1	.667	19.3	58	50
6	Platinum Karaoke	3	2	1	.667	19.3	58	45
7	Pioneer ElastoSeal Katibays	3	2	1	.667	17.3	52	40
8	Barangay Ginebra San Miguel	3	1	2	.333	15.0	45	35
Winners of 9th–12th classification games
9	NorthPort Batang Pier	3	1	2	.333	20.0	60	20
10	Blackwater Bossing Red President	3	1	2	.333	16.3	49	18
Losers of 9th–12th classification games
11	Purefoods TJ Titans	3	0	3	.000	14.0	28	16
12	Terrafirma 3x3	3	0	3	.000	17.3	52	14

Source: PBA 3x3

== 4th leg ==
=== Groupings ===
Pool A	Pool B	Pool C	Pool D
Meralco Bolts 3x3 (1); Barangay Ginebra San Miguel (8); NorthPort Batang Pier (9)	J&T Express (2); Pioneer Elastoseal Katibays (7); Blackwater Bossing Red President (10)	Cavitex Braves (3); Platinum Karaoke (6); Purefoods TJ Titans (11)	TNT Tropang Giga (4); San Miguel Beermen (5); Terrafirma 3x3 (12)

=== Preliminary round ===
==== Pool A ====
Pos	Team	Pld	W	L	PF	PA	PD	PCT	Qualification
1	Meralco Bolts 3x3	2	2	0	36	30	+6	1.000	Quarterfinals
2	NorthPort Batang Pier	2	1	1	32	32	0	.500	Quarterfinals
3	Barangay Ginebra San Miguel	2	0	2	27	33	−6	.000	9th–12th classification

Source: PBA 3x3
Rules for classification: 1) Wins; Win ratio if unequal number of games; 2) Head-to-head record; 3) Average points per game; 4) Higher seed.

October 8
11:00 am

Report

Barangay Ginebra San Miguel	14–15	NorthPort Batang Pier

Robinsons Town Mall Malabon

October 8
12:40 pm

Report

Meralco Bolts 3x3	18–17	NorthPort Batang Pier

Robinsons Town Mall Malabon

October 8
2:20 pm

Report

Meralco Bolts 3x3	18–13	Barangay Ginebra San Miguel

Robinsons Town Mall Malabon

==== Pool B ====
Pos	Team	Pld	W	L	PF	PA	PD	PCT	Qualification
1	J&T Express	2	2	0	42	35	+7	1.000	Quarterfinals
2	Pioneer ElastoSeal Katibays	2	1	1	36	37	−1	.500	Quarterfinals
3	Blackwater Bossing Red President	2	0	2	33	39	−6	.000	9th–12th classification

Source: PBA 3x3
Rules for classification: 1) Wins; Win ratio if unequal number of games; 2) Head-to-head record; 3) Average points per game; 4) Higher seed.

October 8
11:25 am

Report

Pioneer ElastoSeal Katibays	18–16	Blackwater Bossing Red President

Robinsons Town Mall Malabon

October 8
1:05 pm

Report

J&T Express	21–17	Blackwater Bossing Red President

Robinsons Town Mall Malabon

October 8
2:45 pm

Report

J&T Express	21–18	Pioneer ElastoSeal Katibays

Robinsons Town Mall Malabon

==== Pool C ====
Pos	Team	Pld	W	L	PF	PA	PD	PCT	Qualification
1	Platinum Karaoke	2	2	0	31	21	+10	1.000	Quarterfinals
2	Cavitex Braves	2	1	1	23	24	−1	.500	Quarterfinals
3	Purefoods TJ Titans	2	0	2	22	31	−9	.000	9th–12th classification

Source: PBA 3x3
Rules for classification: 1) Wins; Win ratio if unequal number of games; 2) Head-to-head record; 3) Average points per game; 4) Higher seed.

October 8
11:50 am

Report

Platinum Karaoke	16–13	Purefoods TJ Titans

Robinsons Town Mall Malabon

October 8
1:30 pm

Report

Cavitex Braves	8–15	Platinum Karaoke

Robinsons Town Mall Malabon

October 8
3:10 pm

Report

Cavitex Braves	15–9	Purefoods TJ Titans

Robinsons Town Mall Malabon

==== Pool D ====
Pos	Team	Pld	W	L	PF	PA	PD	PCT	Qualification
1	San Miguel Beermen	2	2	0	42	36	+6	1.000	Quarterfinals
2	TNT Tropang Giga	2	1	1	41	33	+8	.500	Quarterfinals
3	Terrafirma 3x3	2	0	2	29	43	−14	.000	9th–12th classification

Source: PBA 3x3
Rules for classification: 1) Wins; Win ratio if unequal number of games; 2) Head-to-head record; 3) Average points per game; 4) Higher seed.

October 8
12:15 pm

Report

TNT Tropang Giga	19–21	San Miguel Beermen

Robinsons Town Mall Malabon

October 8
1:55 pm

Report

TNT Tropang Giga	22–12	Terrafirma 3x3

Robinsons Town Mall Malabon

October 8
3:35 pm

Report

San Miguel Beermen	21–17	Terrafirma 3x3

Robinsons Town Mall Malabon

=== Classification 9th–12th ===
October 9
11:00 am

Report

Barangay Ginebra San Miguel	21–20	Purefoods TJ Titans

Robinsons Town Mall Malabon

October 9
1:55 pm

Report

Terrafirma 3x3	19–21	Blackwater Bossing Red President

Robinsons Town Mall Malabon

=== Knockout stage ===
San Miguel Beermen defeated TNT Tropang Giga in the finals, 22–20, to become the fourth leg winners.

==== Bracket ====
Quarterfinals
A1	Meralco Bolts 3x3	16
C2	Cavitex Braves	15
D1	San Miguel Beermen	20
B2	Pioneer ElastoSeal Katibays	14
B1	J&T Express	17
D2	TNT Tropang Giga	22
C1	Platinum Karaoke	18
A2	NorthPort Batang Pier	13

Semifinals
A1	Meralco Bolts 3x3	12
D1	San Miguel Beermen	15
D2	TNT Tropang Giga	14
C1	Platinum Karaoke	12

Finals
D1	San Miguel Beermen	22
D2	TNT Tropang Giga	20
Third place
A1	Meralco Bolts 3x3	19
C1	Platinum Karaoke	12

==== Quarterfinals ====
October 9
11:25 am

Report

Meralco Bolts 3x3	16–15	Cavitex Braves

Robinsons Town Mall Malabon

October 9
11:50 am

Report

San Miguel Beermen	20–14	Pioneer ElastoSeal Katibays

Robinsons Town Mall Malabon

October 9
12:15 pm

Report

J&T Express	17–22	TNT Tropang Giga

Robinsons Town Mall Malabon

October 9
12:40 pm

Report

Platinum Karaoke	18–13	NorthPort Batang Pier

Robinsons Town Mall Malabon

==== Semifinals ====
October 9
1:05 pm

Report

Meralco Bolts 3x3	12–15	San Miguel Beermen

Robinsons Town Mall Malabon

October 9
1:30 pm

Report

TNT Tropang Giga	14–12	Platinum Karaoke

Robinsons Town Mall Malabon

==== Third place game ====
October 9
2:35 pm

Report

Meralco Bolts 3x3	19–12	Platinum Karaoke

Robinsons Town Mall Malabon

==== Finals ====
October 9
3:00 pm

Report

San Miguel Beermen	22–20	TNT Tropang Giga

Robinsons Town Mall Malabon

=== Final standings ===
Pos	Team	Pld	W	L	PCT	AVG	PF	Tour points
1	San Miguel Beermen	5	5	0	1.000	19.8	99	100
2	TNT Tropang Giga	5	3	2	.600	19.4	97	80
3	Meralco Bolts 3x3	5	4	1	.800	16.6	83	70
4	Platinum Karaoke	5	3	2	.600	14.6	73	60
Eliminated at the quarterfinals
5	J&T Express	3	2	1	.667	19.7	59	50
6	Pioneer ElastoSeal Katibays	3	1	2	.333	16.7	50	45
7	NorthPort Batang Pier	3	1	2	.333	15.0	45	40
8	Cavitex Braves	3	1	2	.333	12.7	38	35
Winners of 9th–12th classification games
9	Blackwater Bossing Red President	3	1	2	.333	18.0	54	20
10	Barangay Ginebra San Miguel	3	1	2	.333	16.0	48	18
Losers of 9th–12th classification games
11	Terrafirma 3x3	3	0	3	.000	16.0	48	16
12	Purefoods TJ Titans	3	0	3	.000	14.0	42	14

Source: PBA 3x3

== 5th leg ==
=== Groupings ===
Pool A	Pool B	Pool C	Pool D
San Miguel Beermen (1); Cavitex Braves (8); Blackwater Bossing Red President (9)	TNT Tropang Giga (2); NorthPort Batang Pier (7); Barangay Ginebra San Miguel (10)	Meralco Bolts 3x3 (3); Pioneer Elastoseal Katibays (6); Terrafirma 3x3 (11)	Platinum Karaoke (4); J&T Express (5); Purefoods TJ Titans (12)

=== Preliminary round ===
==== Pool A ====
Pos	Team	Pld	W	L	PF	PA	PD	PCT	Qualification
1	Blackwater Bossing Red President	2	1	1	40	34	+6	.500	Quarterfinals
2	Cavitex Braves	2	1	1	37	40	−3	.500	Quarterfinals
3	San Miguel Beermen	2	1	1	34	37	−3	.500	9th–12th classification

Source: PBA 3x3
Rules for classification: 1) Wins; Win ratio if unequal number of games; 2) Head-to-head record; 3) Average points per game; 4) Higher seed.

October 15
11:00 am

Report

San Miguel Beermen	13–21	Blackwater Bossing Red President

Robinsons Novaliches

October 15
12:40 pm

Report

Cavitex Braves	21–19	Blackwater Bossing Red President

Robinsons Novaliches

October 15
2:20 pm

Report

San Miguel Beermen	21–16	Cavitex Braves

Robinsons Novaliches

==== Pool B ====
Pos	Team	Pld	W	L	PF	PA	PD	PCT	Qualification
1	TNT Tropang Giga	2	2	0	42	23	+19	1.000	Quarterfinals
2	Barangay Ginebra San Miguel	2	1	1	29	35	−6	.500	Quarterfinals
3	NorthPort Batang Pier	2	0	2	26	39	−13	.000	9th–12th classification

Source: PBA 3x3
Rules for classification: 1) Wins; Win ratio if unequal number of games; 2) Head-to-head record; 3) Average points per game; 4) Higher seed.

October 15
11:25 am

Report

NorthPort Batang Pier	14–18	Barangay Ginebra San Miguel

Robinsons Novaliches

October 15
1:05 pm

Report

TNT Tropang Giga	21–11	Barangay Ginebra San Miguel

Robinsons Novaliches

October 15
2:45 pm

Report

TNT Tropang Giga	21–12	NorthPort Batang Pier

Robinsons Novaliches

==== Pool C ====
Pos	Team	Pld	W	L	PF	PA	PD	PCT	Qualification
1	Meralco Bolts 3x3	2	2	0	37	26	+11	1.000	Quarterfinals
2	Pioneer ElastoSeal Katibays	2	1	1	34	38	−4	.500	Quarterfinals
3	Terrafirma 3x3	2	0	2	29	36	−7	.000	9th–12th classification

Source: PBA 3x3
Rules for classification: 1) Wins; Win ratio if unequal number of games; 2) Head-to-head record; 3) Average points per game; 4) Higher seed.

October 15
11:50 am

Report

Pioneer ElastoSeal Katibays	20–17	Terrafirma 3x3

Robinsons Novaliches

October 15
1:30 pm

Report

Meralco Bolts 3x3	16–12	Terrafirma 3x3

Robinsons Novaliches

October 15
3:10 pm

Report

Meralco Bolts 3x3	21–14	Pioneer ElastoSeal Katibays

Robinsons Novaliches

==== Pool D ====
Pos	Team	Pld	W	L	PF	PA	PD	PCT	Qualification
1	J&T Express	2	2	0	36	27	+9	1.000	Quarterfinals
2	Platinum Karaoke	2	1	1	24	27	−3	.500	Quarterfinals
3	Purefoods TJ Titans	2	0	2	29	35	−6	.000	9th–12th classification

Source: PBA 3x3
Rules for classification: 1) Wins; Win ratio if unequal number of games; 2) Head-to-head record; 3) Average points per game; 4) Higher seed.

October 15
12:15 pm

Report

Platinum Karaoke	14–12	Purefoods TJ Titans

Robinsons Novaliches

October 15
1:55 pm

Report

Platinum Karaoke	10–15	J&T Express

Robinsons Novaliches

October 15
3:35 pm

Report

J&T Express	21–17	Purefoods TJ Titans

Robinsons Novaliches

=== Classification 9th–12th ===
October 16
11:00 am

Report

San Miguel Beermen	18–21	Terrafirma 3x3

Robinsons Novaliches

October 16
1:55 pm

Report

NorthPort Batang Pier	14–21	Purefoods TJ Titans

Robinsons Novaliches

=== Knockout stage ===
TNT Tropang Giga defeated J&T Express in the finals, 21–13, to become the fifth leg winners.

==== Bracket ====
Quarterfinals
A1	Blackwater Bossing Red President	13
C2	Pioneer ElastoSeal Katibays	16
D1	J&T Express	20
B2	Barangay Ginebra San Miguel	18
B1	TNT Tropang Giga	19
D2	Platinum Karaoke	15
C1	Meralco Bolts 3x3	12
A2	Cavitex Braves	15

Semifinals
C2	Pioneer ElastoSeal Katibays	21
D1	J&T Express	22
B1	TNT Tropang Giga	21
A2	Cavitex Braves	16

Finals
D1	J&T Express	13
B1	TNT Tropang Giga	21
Third place
C2	Pioneer ElastoSeal Katibays	14
A2	Cavitex Braves	20

==== Quarterfinals ====
October 16
11:25 am

Report

Blackwater Bossing Red President	13–16	Pioneer ElastoSeal Katibays

Robinsons Novaliches

October 16
11:50 am

Report

J&T Express	20–18	Barangay Ginebra San Miguel

Robinsons Novaliches

October 16
12:15 pm

Report

TNT Tropang Giga	19–15	Platinum Karaoke

Robinsons Novaliches

October 16
12:40 pm

Report

Meralco Bolts 3x3	12–15	Cavitex Braves

Robinsons Novaliches

==== Semifinals ====
October 16
1:05 pm

Report

Pioneer ElastoSeal Katibays	21–22	J&T Express

Robinsons Novaliches

October 16
1:30 pm

Report

TNT Tropang Giga	21–16	Cavitex Braves

Robinsons Novaliches

==== Third place game ====
October 16
2:35 pm

Report

Pioneer ElastoSeal Katibays	14–20	Cavitex Braves

Robinsons Novaliches

==== Finals ====
October 16
3:00 pm

Report

J&T Express	13–21	TNT Tropang Giga

Robinsons Novaliches

=== Final standings ===
Pos	Team	Pld	W	L	PCT	AVG	PF	Tour points
1	TNT Tropang Giga	5	5	0	1.000	20.6	103	100
2	J&T Express	5	4	1	.800	18.2	91	80
3	Cavitex Braves	5	3	2	.600	17.6	88	70
4	Pioneer ElastoSeal Katibays	5	2	3	.400	17.0	85	60
Eliminated at the quarterfinals
5	Meralco Bolts 3x3	3	2	1	.667	16.3	49	50
6	Blackwater Bossing Red President	3	1	2	.333	17.7	53	45
7	Barangay Ginebra San Miguel	3	1	2	.333	15.7	47	40
8	Platinum Karaoke	3	1	2	.333	13.0	39	35
Winners of 9th–12th classification games
9	Purefoods TJ Titans	3	1	2	.333	16.7	50	20
10	Terrafirma 3x3	3	1	2	.333	16.7	50	18
Losers of 9th–12th classification games
11	San Miguel Beermen	3	1	2	.333	17.3	52	16
12	NorthPort Batang Pier	3	0	3	.000	13.3	40	14

Source: PBA 3x3

== 6th leg ==
=== Groupings ===
Pool A	Pool B	Pool C	Pool D
TNT Tropang Giga (1); Platinum Karaoke (8); Purefoods TJ Titans (9)	J&T Express (2); Barangay Ginebra San Miguel (7); Terrafirma 3x3 (10)	Cavitex Braves (3); Blackwater Bossing Red President (6); San Miguel Beermen (11)	Pioneer Elastoseal Katibays (4); Meralco Bolts 3x3 (5); NorthPort Batang Pier (12)

=== Preliminary round ===
==== Pool A ====
Pos	Team	Pld	W	L	PF	PA	PD	PCT	Qualification
1	Platinum Karaoke	2	2	0	34	28	+6	1.000	Quarterfinals
2	TNT Tropang Giga	2	1	1	35	33	+2	.500	Quarterfinals
3	Purefoods TJ Titans	2	0	2	28	36	−8	.000	9th–12th classification

Source: PBA 3x3
Rules for classification: 1) Wins; Win ratio if unequal number of games; 2) Head-to-head record; 3) Average points per game; 4) Higher seed.

October 22
11:00 am

Report

Platinum Karaoke	15–14	Purefoods TJ Titans

Robinsons Place Antipolo

October 22
12:40 pm

Report

TNT Tropang Giga	21–14	Purefoods TJ Titans

Robinsons Place Antipolo

October 22
2:20 pm

Report

TNT Tropang Giga	14–19	Platinum Karaoke

Robinsons Place Antipolo

==== Pool B ====
Pos	Team	Pld	W	L	PF	PA	PD	PCT	Qualification
1	Barangay Ginebra San Miguel	2	2	0	37	29	+8	1.000	Quarterfinals
2	J&T Express	2	1	1	37	32	+5	.500	Quarterfinals
3	Terrafirma 3x3	2	0	2	28	41	−13	.000	9th–12th classification

Source: PBA 3x3
Rules for classification: 1) Wins; Win ratio if unequal number of games; 2) Head-to-head record; 3) Average points per game; 4) Higher seed.

October 22
11:25 am

Report

Barangay Ginebra San Miguel	20–13	Terrafirma 3x3

Robinsons Place Antipolo

October 22
1:05 pm

Report

J&T Express	21–15	Terrafirma 3x3

Robinsons Place Antipolo

October 22
2:45 pm

Report

J&T Express	16–17	Barangay Ginebra San Miguel

Robinsons Place Antipolo

==== Pool C ====
Pos	Team	Pld	W	L	PF	PA	PD	PCT	Qualification
1	San Miguel Beermen	2	2	0	42	32	+10	1.000	Quarterfinals
2	Cavitex Braves	2	1	1	36	40	−4	.500	Quarterfinals
3	Blackwater Bossing Red President	2	0	2	36	42	−6	.000	9th–12th classification

Source: PBA 3x3
Rules for classification: 1) Wins; Win ratio if unequal number of games; 2) Head-to-head record; 3) Average points per game; 4) Higher seed.

October 22
11:50 am

Report

Blackwater Bossing Red President	17–21	San Miguel Beermen

Robinsons Place Antipolo

October 22
1:30 pm

Report

Cavitex Braves	21–19	Blackwater Bossing Red President

Robinsons Place Antipolo

October 22
3:10 pm

Report

Cavitex Braves	15–21	San Miguel Beermen

Robinsons Place Antipolo

==== Pool D ====
Pos	Team	Pld	W	L	PF	PA	PD	PCT	Qualification
1	Pioneer ElastoSeal Katibays	2	1	1	34	32	+2	.500	Quarterfinals
2	Meralco Bolts 3x3	2	1	1	30	27	+3	.500	Quarterfinals
3	NorthPort Batang Pier	2	1	1	26	31	−5	.500	9th–12th classification

Source: PBA 3x3
Rules for classification: 1) Wins; Win ratio if unequal number of games; 2) Head-to-head record; 3) Average points per game; 4) Higher seed.

October 22
12:15 pm

Report

Pioneer ElastoSeal Katibays	16–17	NorthPort Batang Pier

Robinsons Place Antipolo

October 22
1:55 pm

Report

Meralco Bolts 3x3	15–9	NorthPort Batang Pier

Robinsons Place Antipolo

October 22
3:35 pm

Report

Pioneer ElastoSeal Katibays	18–15	Meralco Bolts 3x3

Robinsons Place Antipolo

=== Classification 9th–12th ===
October 23
11:00 am

Report

Purefoods TJ Titans	9–21	Blackwater Bossing Red President

Robinsons Place Antipolo

October 23
1:55 pm

Report

Terrafirma 3x3	18–21	NorthPort Batang Pier

Robinsons Place Antipolo

=== Knockout stage ===
TNT Tropang Giga defeated J&T Express in the finals, 21–17, to become the sixth leg winners.

==== Bracket ====
Quarterfinals
A1	Platinum Karaoke	12
C2	Cavitex Braves	19
D1	Pioneer ElastoSeal Katibays	12
B2	J&T Express	21
B1	Barangay Ginebra San Miguel	15
D2	Meralco Bolts 3x3	18
C1	San Miguel Beermen	17
A2	TNT Tropang Giga	21

Semifinals
C2	Cavitex Braves	19
B2	J&T Express	21
D2	Meralco Bolts 3x3	13
A2	TNT Tropang Giga	14

Finals
B2	J&T Express	17
A2	TNT Tropang Giga	21
Third place
C2	Cavitex Braves	19
D2	Meralco Bolts 3x3	17

==== Quarterfinals ====
October 23
11:25 am

Report

Platinum Karaoke	12–19	Cavitex Braves

Robinsons Place Antipolo

October 23
11:50 am

Report

Pioneer ElastoSeal Katibays	12–21	J&T Express

Robinsons Place Antipolo

October 23
12:15 pm

Report

Barangay Ginebra San Miguel	15–18	Meralco Bolts 3x3

Robinsons Place Antipolo

October 23
12:40 pm

Report

San Miguel Beermen	17–21	TNT Tropang Giga

Robinsons Place Antipolo

==== Semifinals ====
October 23
1:05 pm

Report

Cavitex Braves	19–21	J&T Express

Robinsons Place Antipolo

October 23
1:30 pm

Report

Meralco Bolts 3x3	13–14	TNT Tropang Giga

Robinsons Place Antipolo

==== Third place game ====
October 23
2:35 pm

Report

Cavitex Braves	19–17	Meralco Bolts 3x3

Robinsons Place Antipolo

==== Finals ====
October 23
3:00 pm

Report

J&T Express	17–21	TNT Tropang Giga

Robinsons Place Antipolo

=== Final standings ===
Pos	Team	Pld	W	L	PCT	AVG	PF	Tour points
1	TNT Tropang Giga	5	4	1	.800	18.2	91	100
2	J&T Express	5	3	2	.600	19.2	96	80
3	Cavitex Braves	5	3	2	.600	18.6	93	70
4	Meralco Bolts 3x3	5	2	3	.400	15.6	78	60
Eliminated at the quarterfinals
5	San Miguel Beermen	3	2	1	.667	19.7	59	50
6	Barangay Ginebra San Miguel	3	2	1	.667	17.3	52	45
7	Platinum Karaoke	3	2	1	.667	15.3	46	40
8	Pioneer ElastoSeal Katibays	3	1	2	.333	15.3	46	35
Winners of 9th–12th classification games
9	NorthPort Batang Pier	3	2	1	.667	15.7	47	20
10	Blackwater Bossing Red President	3	1	2	.333	19.0	57	18
Losers of 9th–12th classification games
11	Terrafirma 3x3	3	0	3	.000	15.3	46	16
12	Purefoods TJ Titans	3	0	3	.000	12.3	37	14

Source: PBA 3x3

== Legs summary ==
Pos	Team	1st leg	2nd leg	3rd leg	4th leg	5th leg	6th leg	Pts	Qualification
1	TNT Tropang Giga	1st	3rd	4th	2nd	1st	1st	510	Qualification to Grand Finals quarterfinal round
2	Meralco Bolts 3x3	2nd	4th	1st	3rd	5th	4th	420	Qualification to Grand Finals quarterfinal round
3	J&T Express	4th	5th	2nd	5th	2nd	2nd	400	Qualification to Grand Finals quarterfinal round
4	Cavitex Braves	9th	1st	3rd	8th	3rd	3rd	365	Qualification to Grand Finals quarterfinal round
5	San Miguel Beermen	10th	2nd	5th	1st	11th	5th	314	Qualification to Grand Finals preliminary round
6	Platinum Karaoke	3rd	6th	6th	4th	8th	7th	295	Qualification to Grand Finals preliminary round
7	Pioneer ElastoSeal Katibays	6th	8th	7th	6th	4th	8th	260	Qualification to Grand Finals preliminary round
8	Blackwater Bossing Red President	5th	7th	10th	9th	6th	10th	191	Qualification to Grand Finals preliminary round
9	Barangay Ginebra San Miguel	11th	10th	8th	10th	7th	6th	172	Qualification to Grand Finals preliminary round
10	NorthPort Batang Pier	7th	11th	9th	7th	12th	9th	150	Qualification to Grand Finals preliminary round
11	Purefoods TJ Titans	8th	12th	11th	12th	9th	12th	113	
12	Terrafirma 3x3	12th	9th	12th	11th	10th	11th	98	

Source: PBA 3x3

== Grand Finals ==
=== Preliminary round ===
==== Pool A ====
Pos	Team	Pld	W	L	PF	PA	PD	PCT	Qualification
1	San Miguel Beermen	2	2	0	42	33	+9	1.000	Quarterfinals
2	Barangay Ginebra San Miguel	2	1	1	36	37	−1	.500	Quarterfinals
3	Blackwater Bossing Red President	2	0	2	33	41	−8	.000	

Source: PBA 3x3
Rules for classification: 1) Wins; Win ratio if unequal number of games; 2) Head-to-head record; 3) Average points per game; 4) Higher seed.

October 30
2:00 pm

Report

San Miguel Beermen	21–17	Blackwater Bossing Red President

Robinsons Novaliches

October 30
2:50 pm

Report

San Miguel Beermen	21–16	Barangay Ginebra San Miguel

Robinsons Novaliches

October 30
3:40 pm

Report

Blackwater Bossing Red President	16–20	Barangay Ginebra San Miguel

Robinsons Novaliches

==== Pool B ====
Pos	Team	Pld	W	L	PF	PA	PD	PCT	Qualification
1	Platinum Karaoke	2	2	0	40	36	+4	1.000	Quarterfinals
2	NorthPort Batang Pier	2	1	1	38	38	0	.500	Quarterfinals
3	Pioneer ElastoSeal Katibays	2	0	2	37	41	−4	.000	

Source: PBA 3x3
Rules for classification: 1) Wins; Win ratio if unequal number of games; 2) Head-to-head record; 3) Average points per game; 4) Higher seed.

October 30
2:25 pm

Report

Platinum Karaoke	19–18	NorthPort Batang Pier

Robinsons Novaliches

October 30
3:15 pm

Report

Platinum Karaoke	21–18	Pioneer ElastoSeal Katibays

Robinsons Novaliches

October 30
4:05 pm

Report

Pioneer ElastoSeal Katibays	19–20	NorthPort Batang Pier

Robinsons Novaliches

=== Knockout stage ===
==== Bracket ====
Seed refers to the position of the team after six legs. Letter and number inside parentheses denotes the pool letter and pool position of the team, respectively, after the preliminary round of the Grand Finals.

Quarterfinals
1	TNT Tropang Giga	21
10 (B2)	NorthPort Batang Pier	11
5 (A1)	San Miguel Beermen	13
4	Cavitex Braves	21
2	Meralco Bolts 3x3	21
9 (A2)	Barangay Ginebra San Miguel	12
6 (B1)	Platinum Karaoke	19
3	J&T Express	15

Semifinals
1	TNT Tropang Giga	21
4	Cavitex Braves	16
2	Meralco Bolts 3x3	15
6 (B1)	Platinum Karaoke	16

Finals
1	TNT Tropang Giga	20
6 (B1)	Platinum Karaoke	17
Third place
4	Cavitex Braves	16
2	Meralco Bolts 3x3	11

==== Quarterfinals ====
October 30
4:30 pm

Report

San Miguel Beermen	13–21	Cavitex Braves

Robinsons Novaliches

October 30
4:55 pm

Report

TNT Tropang Giga	21–11	NorthPort Batang Pier

Robinsons Novaliches

October 30
5:20 pm

Report

Meralco Bolts 3x3	21–12	Barangay Ginebra San Miguel

Robinsons Novaliches

October 30
5:45 pm

Report

Platinum Karaoke	19–15	J&T Express

Robinsons Novaliches

==== Semifinals ====
October 30
6:35 pm

Report

Cavitex Braves	16–21	TNT Tropang Giga

Robinsons Novaliches

October 30
7:00 pm

Report

Meralco Bolts 3x3	15–16	Platinum Karaoke

Robinsons Novaliches

==== Third place game ====
October 30
7:40 pm

Report

Cavitex Braves	16–11	Meralco Bolts 3x3

Robinsons Novaliches

==== Finals ====
October 30
8:05 pm

Report

TNT Tropang Giga	20–17	Platinum Karaoke

Robinsons Novaliches
