= 2022–23 PBA season =

47th PBA season

- Duration: June 5, 2022 – April 21, 2023
- Teams: 12+1
- TV partner(s): Local: One Sports; TV5; One Sports; PBA Rush (HD); International: AksyonTV International; Online: Cignal Play iWantTFC (international)

PBA season 47
- Top draft pick: Brandon Ganuelas-Rosser
- Picked by: Blackwater Bossing
- Season MVP: June Mar Fajardo (San Miguel Beermen)
- Top scorer: CJ Perez (San Miguel Beermen)
- Philippine Cup champions: San Miguel Beermen
- Philippine Cup runners-up: TNT Tropang Giga
- Commissioner's Cup champions: Barangay Ginebra San Miguel
- Commissioner's Cup runners-up: Bay Area Dragons
- Governors' Cup champions: TNT Tropang Giga
- Governors' Cup runners-up: Barangay Ginebra San Miguel

Seasons
- ← 2021 2023–24 →

The 2022–23 PBA season or PBA season 47 was the 47th season of the Philippine Basketball Association (PBA). For the first time in two seasons, the league returned to its regular three-conference format, starting with the Philippine Cup. The Commissioner's and Governors' Cups were the second and third conferences in this season.

After the PBA adjusted its calendar again, the association's 47th season started on June 5, 2022, and ended on April 21, 2023. Also for the first time since 2018, the season spanned two calendar years. The first activity of the season was the PBA season 47 draft, held on May 15, 2022.

The best-attended 2022-23 PBA game took place at the Philippine Arena in front of an attendance of 54,589. It was the final of the PBA Commissioner's Cup. The first six games of the series averaged an attendance of 18,453. All seven games in the finals drew an average crowd of 23,615.

== Executive board ==
- Commissioner: Willie Marcial
- Chairman: Ricky Vargas (Representing TNT Tropang Giga)
- Vice-Chairman: Demosthenes Rosales (Representing Terrafirma Dyip)
- Treasurer: Raymond Zorrilla (Representing Phoenix Super LPG Fuel Masters)

== Teams ==
Changes from 2021:

- Alaska Aces franchise bought out by Converge ICT, to become as the Converge FiberXers.
- Bay Area Dragons, franchise team for the East Asia Super League, played in the Commissioner's Cup as a guest team.

Team	Company	Governor	Coach	Captain
Barangay Ginebra San Miguel	Ginebra San Miguel, Inc.	Alfrancis Chua	Tim Cone	LA Tenorio
Bay Area Dragons (guest team)	East Asia Super League Ltd.	—N/a	Brian Goorjian	
Blackwater Bossing	Ever Bilena Cosmetics, Inc.	Silliman Sy	Ariel Vanguardia (interim)	JVee Casio
Converge FiberXers	Converge ICT	Chito Salud	Aldin Ayo	Jeron Teng
Magnolia Chicken Timplados Hotshots	San Miguel Pure Foods Company, Inc.	Rene Pardo	Chito Victolero	Rafi Reavis
Meralco Bolts	Manila Electric Company	Al Panlilio	Norman Black	Raymond Almazan
NLEX Road Warriors	Metro Pacific Investments Corporation	Rodrigo Franco	Frankie Lim	Kevin Alas
NorthPort Batang Pier	Sultan 900 Capital, Inc.	Eric Arejola	Bonnie Tan (interim)	Arwind Santos
Phoenix Super LPG Fuel Masters	Phoenix Petroleum Philippines, Inc.	Raymond Zorrilla	Jamike Jarin (interim)	RJ Jazul
Rain or Shine Elasto Painters	Asian Coatings Philippines, Inc.	Mamerto Mondragon	Yeng Guiao	Gabe Norwood
San Miguel Beermen	San Miguel Brewery, Inc.	Robert Non	Jorge Gallent	Chris Ross
Terrafirma Dyip	Terrafirma Realty Development Corporation	Demosthenes Rosales	Johnedel Cardel	Alex Cabagnot
TNT Tropang Giga	Smart Communications	Ricky Vargas	Jojo Lastimosa	Kelly Williams

== Arenas ==
With the relaxation of government restrictions related to the COVID-19 pandemic, the PBA has returned to playing to different Metro Manila venues. The PBA plans to return to playing games in the provinces, plus an out-of-the-country game, during the Governors' Cup.

Game 7 of the Commissioner's Cup finals was held at the Philippine Arena in Bocaue, Bulacan.

Ultimately, during the Governors' Cup, only the 2023 PBA All-Star Weekend was held outside Metro Manila and Rizal, which was hosted by Passi, Iloilo.

Arena	City	Capacity
Araneta Coliseum	Quezon City	14,429
Filoil Ecooil Centre	San Juan	6,000
Philippine Arena	Bocaue, Bulacan	55,000
PhilSports Arena	Pasig	10,000
SM Mall of Asia Arena	Pasay	15,000
Ynares Center	Antipolo, Rizal	7,400

== Transactions ==
=== Retirement ===
- On June 1, 2022, Joe Devance announced his retirement from the PBA. Devance played for four teams in his 16 seasons in the league.
- On June 7, 2022, Andre Paras announced his retirement from the PBA. Paras played for Blackwater Bossing for only one season.
- On September 19, 2022, Paul Desiderio announced his retirement from the PBA. Desiderio played for the Blackwater Bossing franchise in his three seasons in the league.
- On January 7, 2023, Larry Fonacier formally retired after being tapped by NLEX Road Warriors as its team manager. Fonacier played for five teams in his 15 seasons in the league.

=== Coaching changes ===
There were no offseason coaching changes; all of the listed changes below occurred mid-season.

Team	Outgoing	Incoming
Converge FiberXers	Jeffrey Cariaso	Aldin Ayo
NLEX Road Warriors	Yeng Guiao	Adonis Tierra (interim)
Rain or Shine Elasto Painters	Chris Gavina	Yeng Guiao
NLEX Road Warriors	Adonis Tierra (interim)	Frankie Lim
TNT Tropang Giga	Chot Reyes	Jojo Lastimosa
Phoenix Super LPG Fuel Masters	Topex Robinson	Jamike Jarin (interim)
NorthPort Batang Pier	Pido Jarencio	Bonnie Tan (interim)
San Miguel Beermen	Leo Austria	Jorge Gallent

== Rule changes ==
The PBA competition committee approved the rule changes for implementation starting in the Philippine Cup games:

Rule changes (effective for the 2022 PBA Philippine Cup)
1. The offensive player's "side-swipe" motion to create a contact on a defender's extended arm will only be considered as a "regular" foul and not a "shooting" foul.
2. Referees are now allowed to give a warning to players who may have already incurred a flagrant foul or any player from the same team for any unsportsmanlike conduct.
3. Floppers will now be given an outright non-unsportsmanlike technical foul.
4. Players located beyond the three point arc during a free throw situation are now allowed to enter the paint once the ball is released by the free throw shooter.
5. A defensive player stopping an offensive player without the ball in transition will be charged with a deliberate foul, regardless of clear path.
6. A player who has the control of the ball but is lying on the ground can no longer call a timeout.

== Notable events ==
=== Pre-season ===
- The PBA Board of Governors approved the return of the three-conference format this season.
- Ricky Vargas of TNT Tropang Giga was re-elected for a fifth consecutive term as the Chairman of the PBA Board of Governors. Bobby Rosales of Terrafirma Dyip was re-elected as Vice Chairman, while Raymond Zorilla of the Phoenix Super LPG Fuel Masters was elected as treasurer. Vargas is currently the longest-serving head of the PBA Board of Governors since the presidency of Ginebra San Miguel's Carlos "Honeyboy" Palanca III (1983 to 1986) and the chairmanship of Formula Shell's Reynaldo Marquez (1987 to 1990).

=== Philippine Cup ===
- The PBA D-League opened its first tournament, the 2022 Aspirant's Cup for the first time in two years on July 7.

== Opening ceremonies ==
The opening ceremony for this season was held at the Smart Araneta Coliseum in Quezon City on June 5, 2022, hosted by Vhong Navarro and Gretchen Ho. The PBA Leo Awards for the 2021 season was held before the opening ceremonies.

The first game of the Philippine Cup between the Converge FiberXers and the Rain or Shine Elasto Painters was played after the opening ceremonies.

Below is the list of team muses:

Team	Muse
Barangay Ginebra San Miguel	AJ Raval
Blackwater Bossing	Hannah Arnold
Converge FiberXers	Maureen Wroblewitz
Magnolia Chicken Timplados Hotshots	Michelle Dee
Meralco Bolts	Kim Mangrobang
NLEX Road Warriors	Bea Magtanong
NorthPort Batang Pier	Zabel Lambert
Phoenix Super LPG Fuel Masters	Celeste Cortesi
Rain or Shine Elasto Painters	Joana Marie Relloso
San Miguel Beermen	Ksenia Grondetska
Terrafirma Dyip	Azriel Coloma
TNT Tropang Giga	Sue Ramirez

== 2022 PBA Philippine Cup ==
The Philippine Cup started on June 5 and ended on September 4, 2022.

=== Elimination round ===
Pos	Team	W	L	PCT	GB	Qualification
1	San Miguel Beermen	9	2	.818	—	Twice-to-beat in the quarterfinals
2	TNT Tropang Giga	8	3	.727 (Note: Head-to-head quotient:TNT 1.12, Magnolia 0.99, Barangay Ginebra 0.90)	1	Twice-to-beat in the quarterfinals
3	Magnolia Chicken Timplados Hotshots	8	3	.727	1	Best-of-three quarterfinals
4	Barangay Ginebra San Miguel	8	3	.727	1	Best-of-three quarterfinals
5	Meralco Bolts	7	4	.636	2	Best-of-three quarterfinals
6	NLEX Road Warriors	6	5	.545	3	Best-of-three quarterfinals
7	Converge FiberXers	5	6	.455 (Note: Head-to-head record: Converge 1–0 Blackwater)	4	Twice-to-win in the quarterfinals
8	Blackwater Bossing	5	6	.455	4	Twice-to-win in the quarterfinals
9	Rain or Shine Elasto Painters	4	7	.364	5	
10	NorthPort Batang Pier	3	8	.273 (Note: Head-to-head record: NorthPort 1–0 Phoenix)	6	
11	Phoenix Super LPG Fuel Masters	3	8	.273	6	
12	Terrafirma Dyip	0	11	.000	9	

Source: PBA.ph
Rules for classification: 1) winning percentage; 2) if two teams are tied, head-to-head record; if three or more teams are tied, head-to-head goal average (quotient); if tied for 8th, one-game playoff; 3) overall quotient; 4) coin toss

=== Playoffs ===
Quarterfinals
(#1 twice-to-beat)
1	San Miguel	123
8	Blackwater	93
(Best-of-3)
4	Barangay Ginebra	1
5	Meralco	2
(#2 twice-to-beat)
2	TNT	116
7	Converge	95
(Best-of-3)
3	Magnolia	2
6	NLEX	1

Semifinals (Best-of-7)
1	San Miguel	4
5	Meralco	3
2	TNT	4
3	Magnolia	2

Finals (Best-of-7)
1	San Miguel	4
2	TNT	3

==== Quarterfinals ====
Team 1	Series	Team 2	Game 1	Game 2
(1) San Miguel Beermen*	1–0	(8) Blackwater Bossing	123–93	—
(2) TNT Tropang Giga*	1–0	(7) Converge FiberXers	116–95	—

Team 1	Series	Team 2	Game 1	Game 2	Game 3
(3) Magnolia Chicken Timplados Hotshots	2–1	(6) NLEX Road Warriors	98–89	77–90	112–106 (OT)
(4) Barangay Ginebra San Miguel	1–2	(5) Meralco Bolts	82–93	94–87	104–106

*Team has twice-to-beat advantage. Team 1 only has to win once, while Team 2 has to win twice.

==== Semifinals ====
Team 1	Series	Team 2	Game 1	Game 2	Game 3	Game 4	Game 5	Game 6	Game 7
(1) San Miguel Beermen	4–3	(5) Meralco Bolts	121–97	88–99	96–91	97–111	89–78	92–96	100–89
(2) TNT Tropang Giga	4–2	(3) Magnolia Chicken Timplados Hotshots	108–96	88–92	93–92	102–84	97–105	87–74	—

==== Finals ====
Team 1	Series	Team 2	Game 1	Game 2	Game 3	Game 4	Game 5	Game 6	Game 7
(1) San Miguel Beermen	4–3	(2) TNT Tropang Giga	84–86	109–100	108–100 (OT)	87–100	93–102	114–96	119–97

- Finals MVP: June Mar Fajardo (San Miguel Beermen)
- Best Player of the Conference: June Mar Fajardo (San Miguel Beermen)

== 2022–23 PBA Commissioner's Cup ==
The Commissioner's Cup started on September 21, 2022, and ended on January 15, 2023.

=== Elimination round ===
Pos	Team	W	L	PCT	GB	Qualification
1	Bay Area Dragons (G)	10	2	.833 (Note: Head-to-head record: Bay Area 1–0 Magnolia)	—	Twice-to-beat in the quarterfinals
2	Magnolia Chicken Timplados Hotshots	10	2	.833	—	Twice-to-beat in the quarterfinals
3	Barangay Ginebra San Miguel	9	3	.750	1	Best-of-three quarterfinals
4	Converge FiberXers	8	4	.667	2	Best-of-three quarterfinals
5	San Miguel Beermen	7	5	.583	3	Best-of-three quarterfinals
6	NorthPort Batang Pier	6	6	.500 (Note: Head-to-head record: NorthPort 1–0 Phoenix)	4	Best-of-three quarterfinals
7	Phoenix Super LPG Fuel Masters	6	6	.500	4	Twice-to-win in the quarterfinals
8	Rain or Shine Elasto Painters	5	7	.417 (Note: Eighth seed playoff: Rain or Shine 110–100 NLEX)	5	Twice-to-win in the quarterfinals
9	NLEX Road Warriors	5	7	.417	5	
10	Meralco Bolts	4	8	.333 (Note: Head-to-head record: Meralco 1–0 TNT)	6	
11	TNT Tropang Giga	4	8	.333	6	
12	Blackwater Bossing	3	9	.250	7	
13	Terrafirma Dyip	1	11	.083	9	

Source: PBA.ph
Rules for classification: 1) winning percentage; 2) if two teams are tied, head-to-head record; if three or more teams are tied, head-to-head goal average (quotient); if tied for 8th, one-game playoff; 3) overall quotient; 4) coin toss
(G) Guests

=== Playoffs ===
Quarterfinals
(#1 twice-to-beat)
1	Bay Area	126
8	Rain or Shine	96
(best-of-3)
4	Converge	0
5	San Miguel	2
(#2 twice-to-beat)
2	Magnolia	102
7	Phoenix Super LPG	95
(best-of-3)
3	Barangay Ginebra	2
6	NorthPort	0

Semifinals (Best-of-5)
1	Bay Area	3
5	San Miguel	1
2	Magnolia	1
3	Barangay Ginebra	3

Finals (Best-of-7)
1	Bay Area	3
3	Barangay Ginebra	4

==== Quarterfinals ====
Team 1	Series	Team 2	Game 1	Game 2
(1) Bay Area Dragons*	1–0	(8) Rain or Shine Elasto Painters	126–96	—
(2) Magnolia Chicken Timplados Hotshots*	1–0	(7) Phoenix Super LPG Fuel Masters	102–95	—

Team 1	Series	Team 2	Game 1	Game 2	Game 3
(3) Barangay Ginebra San Miguel	2–0	(6) NorthPort Batang Pier	118–102	99–93	—
(4) Converge FiberXers	0–2	(5) San Miguel Beermen	96–114	107–120	—

*Team has twice-to-beat advantage. Team 1 only has to win once, while Team 2 has to win twice.

==== Semifinals ====
Team 1	Series	Team 2	Game 1	Game 2	Game 3	Game 4	Game 5
(1) Bay Area Dragons	3–1	(5) San Miguel Beermen	103–102	114–95	96–98	94–92	—
(2) Magnolia Chicken Timplados Hotshots	1–3	(3) Barangay Ginebra San Miguel	84–87	96–95	80–103	84–99	—

==== Finals ====
Team 1	Series	Team 2	Game 1	Game 2	Game 3	Game 4	Game 5	Game 6	Game 7
(1) Bay Area Dragons	3–4	(3) Barangay Ginebra San Miguel	81–96	99–82	82–89	94–86	91–101	87–84	99–114

- Finals MVP: Christian Standhardinger (Barangay Ginebra San Miguel)
- Best Player of the Conference: Scottie Thompson (Barangay Ginebra San Miguel)
- Bobby Parks Best Import of the Conference: Justin Brownlee (Barangay Ginebra San Miguel)

== 2023 PBA Governors' Cup ==
The Governors' Cup started on January 22 and ended on April 21, 2023.

=== Elimination round ===
Pos	Team	W	L	PCT	GB	Qualification
1	TNT Tropang Giga	10	1	.909	—	Twice-to-beat in quarterfinals
2	San Miguel Beermen	9	2	.818	1	Twice-to-beat in quarterfinals
3	Barangay Ginebra San Miguel	8	3	.727	2	Twice-to-beat in quarterfinals
4	Meralco Bolts	7	4	.636 (Note: Head-to-head quotient: Meralco 1.10, Magnolia 1.07, NLEX 0.86)	3	Twice-to-beat in quarterfinals
5	Magnolia Chicken Timplados Hotshots	7	4	.636	3	Twice-to-win in quarterfinals
6	NLEX Road Warriors	7	4	.636	3	Twice-to-win in quarterfinals
7	Converge FiberXers	6	5	.545	4	Twice-to-win in quarterfinals
8	Phoenix Super LPG Fuel Masters	4	7	.364	6	Twice-to-win in quarterfinals
9	NorthPort Batang Pier	3	8	.273	7	
10	Rain or Shine Elasto Painters	2	9	.182 (Note: Head-to-head record: Rain or Shine 1–0 Terrafirma)	8	
11	Terrafirma Dyip	2	9	.182	8	
12	Blackwater Bossing	1	10	.091	9	

Source: PBA.ph
Rules for classification: 1) winning percentage; 2) if two teams are tied, head-to-head record; if three or more teams are tied, head-to-head goal average (quotient); if tied for 8th, one-game playoff; 3) overall quotient; 4) coin toss

=== Playoffs ===
Quarterfinals (Top 4 twice-to-beat)
1	TNT	132
8	Phoenix Super LPG	105
4	Meralco	113*
5	Magnolia	107
2	San Miguel	121
7	Converge	105
3	Barangay Ginebra	127
6	NLEX	93

Semifinals (Best-of-5)
1	TNT	3
4	Meralco	1
2	San Miguel	0
3	Barangay Ginebra	3

Finals (Best-of-7)
1	TNT	4
3	Barangay Ginebra	2

*Game went into overtime

==== Quarterfinals ====
Team 1	Series	Team 2	Game 1	Game 2
(1) TNT Tropang Giga*	1–0	(8) Phoenix Super LPG Fuel Masters	132–105	—
(2) San Miguel Beermen*	1–0	(7) Converge FiberXers	121–105	—
(3) Barangay Ginebra San Miguel*	1–0	(6) NLEX Road Warriors	127–93	—
(4) Meralco Bolts*	1–0	(5) Magnolia Chicken Timplados Hotshots	113–107 (OT)	—

*Team has twice-to-beat advantage. Team 1 only has to win once, while Team 2 has to win twice.

==== Semifinals ====
Team 1	Series	Team 2	Game 1	Game 2	Game 3	Game 4	Game 5
(1) TNT Tropang Giga	3–1	(4) Meralco Bolts	110–80	117–124 (OT)	99–80	107–92	—
(2) San Miguel Beermen	0–3	(3) Barangay Ginebra San Miguel	112–121	103–121	85–87	—	—

==== Finals ====
Team 1	Series	Team 2	Game 1	Game 2	Game 3	Game 4	Game 5	Game 6	Game 7
(1) TNT Tropang Giga	4–2	(3) Barangay Ginebra San Miguel	90–102	95–82	103–117	116–104	104–95	97–93	—

- Finals MVP: Mikey Williams (TNT Tropang Giga)
- Best Player of the Conference: Christian Standhardinger (Barangay Ginebra San Miguel)
- Bobby Parks Best Import of the Conference: Rondae Hollis-Jefferson (TNT Tropang Giga)

== Awards ==
=== Leo Awards ===
- Most Valuable Player: June Mar Fajardo (San Miguel)
- Rookie of the Year: Justin Arana (Converge)
- Most Improved Player: Maverick Ahanmisi (Converge)
- First Mythical Team:
  - Scottie Thompson (Barangay Ginebra)
  - June Mar Fajardo (San Miguel)
  - CJ Perez (San Miguel)
  - Jamie Malonzo (Barangay Ginebra)
  - Christian Standhardinger (Barangay Ginebra)
- Second Mythical Team:
  - Calvin Abueva (Magnolia)
  - Mikey Williams (TNT)
  - Robert Bolick (NorthPort)
  - Calvin Oftana (TNT)
  - Arvin Tolentino (NorthPort)
- All-Defensive Team:
  - Christian Standhardinger (Barangay Ginebra)
  - June Mar Fajardo (San Miguel)
  - Jio Jalalon (Magnolia)
  - Cliff Hodge (Meralco)
  - Chris Newsome (Meralco)
- Samboy Lim Sportsmanship Award: Kevin Alas (NLEX)

=== PBA Press Corps annual awards ===
- Defensive Player of the Year: Jio Jalalon (Magnolia)
- Scoring Champion: CJ Perez (San Miguel)
- Baby Dalupan Coach of the Year: Tim Cone (Barangay Ginebra)
- Mr. Quality Minutes: Jericho Cruz (San Miguel)
- Bogs Adornado Comeback Player of the Year: Roi Sumang (NorthPort)
- Danny Floro Executive of the Year: Jojo Lastimosa (TNT)
- Order of Merit: Jayson Castro (TNT)
- All-Rookie Team:
  - Justin Arana (Converge)
  - Brandon Ganuelas-Rosser (NLEX)
  - Encho Serrano (Phoenix)
  - Tyler Tio (Phoenix)
  - Ato Ular (Blackwater)
- Game of the Season: San Miguel vs. TNT (August 21, 2022, Philippine Cup finals game 1)
- President's Award: Philippines men's national basketball team (Gilas Pilipinas)

== Cumulative standings ==
Pos	Team	Pld	W	L	PCT	Best finish
1	Bay Area Dragons (G)	24	17	7	.708	Finalist
2	Barangay Ginebra San Miguel	60	41	19	.683	Champions
3	San Miguel Beermen	59	38	21	.644 (Note: Head-to-head: San Miguel 6–4 TNT)	Champions
4	TNT Tropang Giga	59	38	21	.644	Champions
5	Magnolia Chicken Timplados Hotshots	49	31	18	.633	Semifinalist
6	Meralco Bolts	49	25	24	.510	Semifinalist
7	Converge FiberXers	38	19	19	.500	Quarterfinalist
8	NLEX Road Warriors	39	19	20	.487	Quarterfinalist
9	Phoenix Super LPG Fuel Masters	36	13	23	.361	Quarterfinalist
10	NorthPort Batang Pier	36	12	24	.333 (Note: Head-to-head record: NorthPort 2–1 Rain or Shine)	Quarterfinalist
11	Rain or Shine Elasto Painters	36	12	24	.333	Quarterfinalist
12	Blackwater Bossing	35	9	26	.257	Quarterfinalist
13	Terrafirma Dyip	34	3	31	.088	Elimination round

(G) Guests

=== Elimination round ===
Pos	Team	Pld	W	L	PCT
1	Bay Area Dragons (G)	12	10	2	.833
2	Magnolia Chicken Timplados Hotshots	34	25	9	.735 (Note: Head-to-head elimination round quotient: Magnolia 1.037, San Miguel 1.015, Barangay Ginebra 0.951)
3	San Miguel Beermen	34	25	9	.735
4	Barangay Ginebra San Miguel	34	25	9	.735
5	TNT Tropang Giga	34	22	12	.647
6	Converge FiberXers	34	19	15	.559
7	Meralco Bolts	34	18	16	.529 (Note: Head-to-head elimination round record: NLEX 2–1 Meralco)
8	NLEX Road Warriors	34	18	16	.529
9	Phoenix Super LPG Fuel Masters	34	13	21	.382
10	NorthPort Batang Pier	34	12	22	.353
11	Rain or Shine Elasto Painters	34	11	23	.324
12	Blackwater Bossing	34	9	25	.265
13	Terrafirma Dyip	34	3	31	.088

(G) Guests

=== Playoffs ===
This includes one-game playoffs to determine the last playoff participant.

Pos	Team	Pld	W	L
1	TNT Tropang Giga	25	16	9
2	Barangay Ginebra San Miguel	26	16	10
3	San Miguel Beermen	25	13	12
4	Bay Area Dragons (G)	12	7	5
5	Meralco Bolts	15	7	8
6	Magnolia Chicken Timplados Hotshots	15	6	9
7	Rain or Shine Elasto Painters	2	1	1
8	NLEX Road Warriors	5	1	4
9	Blackwater Bossing	1	0	1
10	NorthPort Batang Pier	2	0	2
11	Phoenix Super LPG Fuel Masters	2	0	2
12	Converge FiberXers	4	0	4
13	Terrafirma Dyip	0	0	0

(G) Guests

== PBA teams in Asian club competitions ==
Team	Competition	Progress
San Miguel Beermen	2023 EASL Champions Week	4th of 4 in group stage
TNT Tropang Giga	2023 EASL Champions Week	4th of 4 in group stage

== 3x3 ==
The 3x3 season started on September 10, 2022, and ended on February 26, 2023.

=== First conference ===
Leg	Champion	Runner-up	Third place
1st	TNT Tropang Giga	Meralco Bolts 3x3	Platinum Karaoke
2nd	Cavitex Braves	San Miguel Beermen	TNT Tropang Giga
3rd	Meralco Bolts 3x3	J&T Express	Cavitex Braves
4th	San Miguel Beermen	TNT Tropang Giga	Meralco Bolts 3x3
5th	TNT Tropang Giga	J&T Express	Cavitex Braves
6th	TNT Tropang Giga	J&T Express	Cavitex Braves
Grand Finals	TNT Tropang Giga	Platinum Karaoke	Cavitex Braves

=== Second conference ===
Leg	Champion	Runner-up	Third place
1st	TNT Tropang Giga	Platinum Karaoke	Barangay Ginebra San Miguel
2nd	J&T Express	TNT Tropang Giga	Cavitex Braves
3rd	TNT Tropang Giga	Cavitex Braves	Meralco Bolts 3x3
4th	Platinum Karaoke	Cavitex Braves	J&T Express
5th	Cavitex Braves	Platinum Karaoke	Pioneer ElastoSeal Katibays
6th	Cavitex Braves	TNT Tropang Giga	Platinum Karaoke
Grand Finals	TNT Tropang Giga	Cavitex Braves	J&T Express

=== Third conference ===
Leg	Champion	Runner-up	Third place
1st	San Miguel Beermen	Pioneer ElastoSeal Katibays	Cavitex Braves
2nd	TNT Tropang Giga	Barangay Ginebra San Miguel	Meralco Bolts 3x3
3rd	Barangay Ginebra San Miguel	Platinum Karaoke	Meralco Bolts 3x3
4th	Cavitex Braves	Pioneer ElastoSeal Katibays	TNT Tropang Giga
5th	Platinum Karaoke	Cavitex Braves	TNT Tropang Giga
6th	J&T Express	TNT Tropang Giga	Meralco Bolts 3x3
Grand Finals	TNT Tropang Giga	San Miguel Beermen	Barangay Ginebra San Miguel
