= Mau Belen =

Filipino basketball coach

Personal information
- Born: 1991 or 1992 (age 33–34)

Career history

Coaching
- 2021–2024: TNT Triple Giga (3x3)
- 2021–2024: TNT Tropang Giga (assistant)
- 2024: Philippines 3x3

Career highlights
- 2× PBA champion (2021 Philippine, 2023 Governors'; 6× PBA 3x3 champion (2021 Third conference, 2022–23 First to Third conferences, 2023–24 First to Second conferences); 1× Grand Slam 3x3 champion (2022–23)

Maureen Kris Belen (born 1991 or 1992) is a Filipino basketball coach who is serving as the commissioner of the Women's Maharlika Pilipinas Basketball League (WMPBL).

== Career ==
=== Coaching career ===
==== Early years (pre-2021) ====
A former high school varsity player, Belen shifted to coaching having limited options to continue her playing career as a woman. She joined coach Eric Altamirano's basketball school to hone her skills before heading to Dubai in the United Arab Emirates where she stayed for four years and worked as a youth coach for the local Filipino community there.

Belen returned to the Philippines in 2017, coaching at least three teams. This include the Philippine National Police women's team in 2019. Her other previous employers were Assumption College and St. Paul College of Parañaque.

==== TNT Tropang Giga assistant coach ====
In March 2021, Belen became the first female coach in the Philippine Basketball Association (PBA) when she was made assistant coach of the Chot Reyes-led staff of TNT Tropang Giga. However, the inclusion of female staff member is not new in the history of the franchise with Debbie Tan as team manager when the team was still known as Mobiline.

==== TNT Triple Giga head coach ====
She would also become head coach of TNT's team in the PBA 3x3. TNT would win the third conference of the 2021 season under her mentorship. The team, later rebranded as the TNT Triple Giga, would continue its winning streak by winning all three conferences in the 2022–23 season – the first ever grand slam in the 3x3 league's history. The team would be disbanded after the PBA 3x3's dissolution after the 2023–24 season.

==== Philippines 3x3 ====
Belen would be the head coach of the Philippines men's national 3x3 team which took part in the 2024 FIBA 3x3 Asia Cup.

=== Sports administration ===
Belen organized sports events in Dubai. She was also part of the organizing team of the basketball tournament of the 2019 Southeast Asian Games in the Philippines.

Belen also served as tournament director of National Basketball Training Center (NBTC) which organizes tournaments for girls.

In 2024, together with former TNT Triple Giga players Chester Saldua, Samboy de Leon and Matt Salem, they founded the basketball league Half Court 3x3.

Following Haydee Ong's resignation as commissioner of the Women's Maharlika Pilipinas Basketball League in April 2026, Belen was named to the role on an interim basis.

== Personal life ==
Belen is a lesbian.
