= TNT Triple Giga =

- Leagues: PBA 3x3
- Founded: 2021
- Folded: 2024
- History: TNT Tropang Giga (2021–2023); TNT Triple Giga (2023–2024)
- Team colors: Black, blue, yellow, orange, white
- Company: Smart Communications
- Championships: 6 championship(s); 2021 Third conference 2022–23 First conference 2022–23 Second conference 2022–23 Third conference 2023–24 First conference 2023–24 Second conference

The TNT Triple Giga was a Philippine 3x3 basketball team which competes in the PBA 3x3, organized by the Philippines' top-flight professional league, Philippine Basketball Association (PBA). The team is affiliated with the PBA franchise, TNT Tropang Giga.

== History ==
The TNT Tropang Giga are among the participating PBA franchise teams in the inaugural 2021 PBA 3x3 season.

=== 2021 PBA 3x3 inaugural season ===
On March 19, 2021, TNT Tropang Giga signed Jeremiah Gray to a one-year contract to play in the inaugural PBA 3x3 tournament.

In 2023, they would debut in the FIBA 3x3 Men's Pro Circuit as Pasig TNT. They played in the World Hoops FIBA 3×3 Penang Challenger 2023 in Malaysia in June. They finished fourth, qualifying for the 2023 FIBA 3×3 World Tour Macau Masters in the process. They were not able to reach the main draw of the Macau Masters however after finishing with a 1-1 win-lose record in the qualifying draw.

Following the shelving of the PBA 3x3 after the conclusion of the 2023–24 season, the team would be disbanded. Coach Mau Belen and the teams players went on to establish The Half Court Group, a 3x3 tournament organizer.

== Notable players ==
- (Philippines) (United States) Jeremiah Gray (2021)
- (Philippines) Samboy de Leon (2021–24)
- (Philippines) Chris Exciminiano (2021–24)
- (Philippines) Chris Javier (2021)
- (Philippines) Gryann Mendoza (2021–24)
- (Philippines) Almond Vosotros (2021–24)

== Head coaches ==
- Mau Belen (2021–2024)

== Season-by-season records ==
FIBA 3x3 World Tour results (Masters and Finals)

Year	Tournament	Position	W	L
2023	Macau Masters	13th (Qualifying draw)	1	1
