= Robinsons Novaliches =

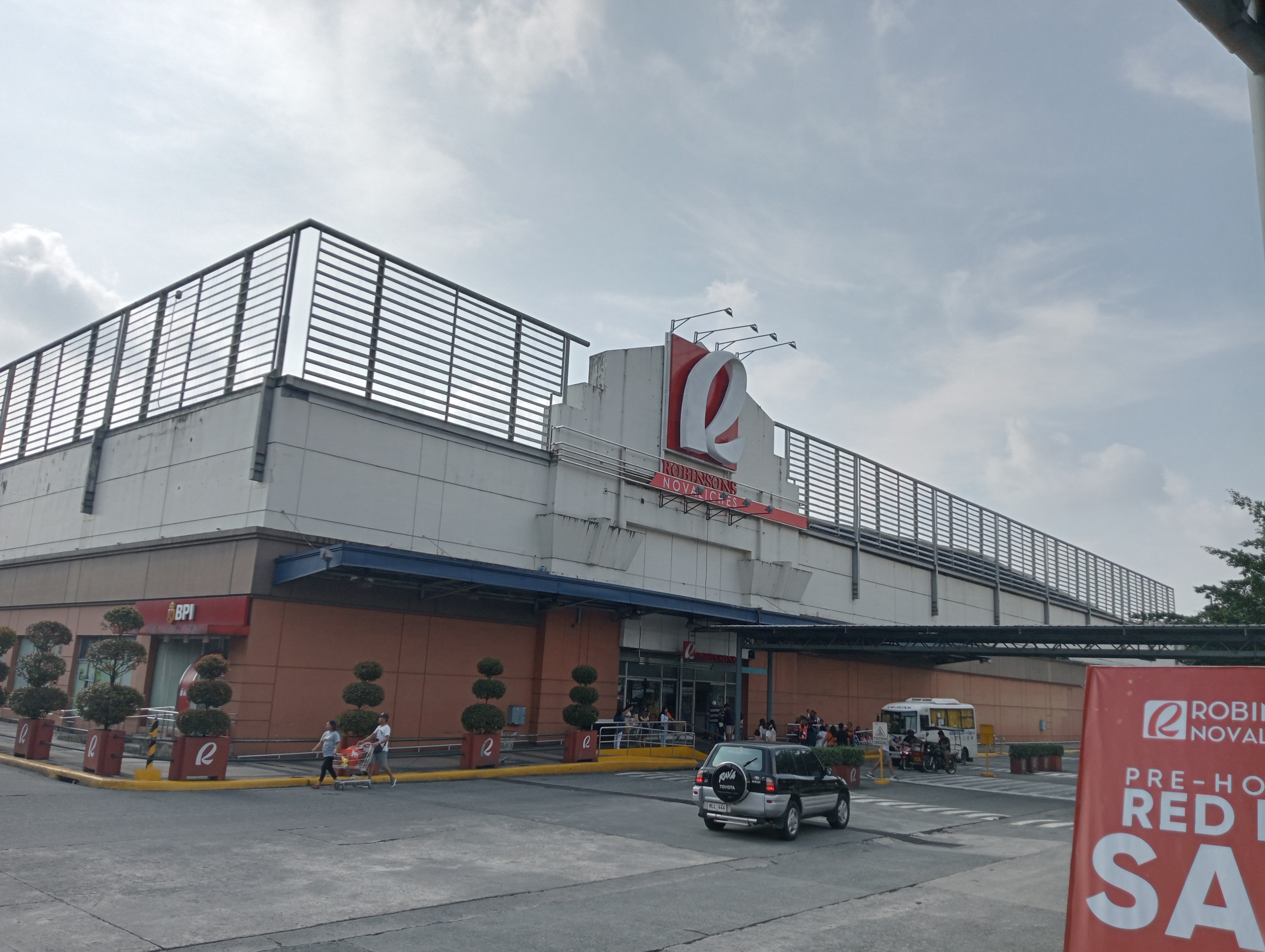
- Eastern entrance of Robinsons Novaliches, September 2023
- Location: Quezon City, Metro Manila, Philippines
- Coordinates: 14°44′10″N 121°03′22″E
- Address: Quirino Highway corner, Maligaya Drive, Brgy. Pasong Putik, Quezon City
- Opened: October 12, 2001; 25 years ago
- Developer: Robinsons Land
- Manager: Robinsons Malls
- Owner: John Gokongwei
- Num. of stores: 200+
- Num. of anchor tenants: 5
- Floor area: 62,893 m^{2} (676,970 sq ft)
- Floors: 3
- Parking: 600+
- Public transit: 7 36 37 38 40 Robinsons Novaliches; 6 17 39 41 49 SM City Fairview; Future: Mindanao Avenue
- Website: Robinsons Malls

Robinsons Novaliches (formerly known as Robinsons Place Novaliches and Robinsons Nova Market), is a shopping mall in Fairview, Quezon City owned and operated by Robinsons Malls, the second largest mall operator in the Philippines. This mall was opened on October 12, 2001. It is the second mall by Robinsons Malls in Quezon City after Robinsons Galleria. It has a total floor area of 62,893 m^{2} (676,970 sq ft).

== Redevelopment and expansion ==
In 2008, Robinsons Place Novaliches was renamed Robinsons Nova Market. During this time, Robinsons Department Store was closed, Bargain Exchange was replaced, and several stores pulled out, creating opportunities for micro-retailers. In 2010, Robinsons Movieworld Novaliches closed Cinemas 5 to 8, which were then rented out to Christian churches. For example, Word of Hope Christian Church occupied Cinemas 5 and 6, while Victory Churches of Asia occupied Cinema 7. In 2012, Cinemas 1 to 4 were permanently closed and subsequently made available for rentals to Christian churches and other groups.

The mall underwent a major renovation and expansion to compete with Ayala Malls' Fairview Terraces and SM City Fairview of SM Prime Holdings. The expansion introduced over 200 micro-retail shops and bargain stores offering apparel, shoes, bags, novelty and gift items, and gadgets, along with a food court, a Trade Hall, and al fresco dining restaurants. It officially opened on May 29, 2015, adding 10,000 m² (110,000 sq ft) to the existing 52,893 m² (493,990 sq ft), bringing the mall’s total floor area to 62,893 m² (601,630 sq ft). Following the expansion, the mall was renamed Robinsons Novaliches.

Moreover, Robinsons Digiworld opened on Level 2 of the Main Mall, occupying the former location of several bargain shops. In November 2016, a Department of Foreign Affairs (DFA) office, DFA CO NCR-North, was also inaugurated on Level 3 near the former Robinsons Movieworld.

== See also ==
- Fairview Terraces
- SM City Fairview
- Robinsons Magnolia
- List of shopping malls in Metro Manila
