= Robinsons Malabon =

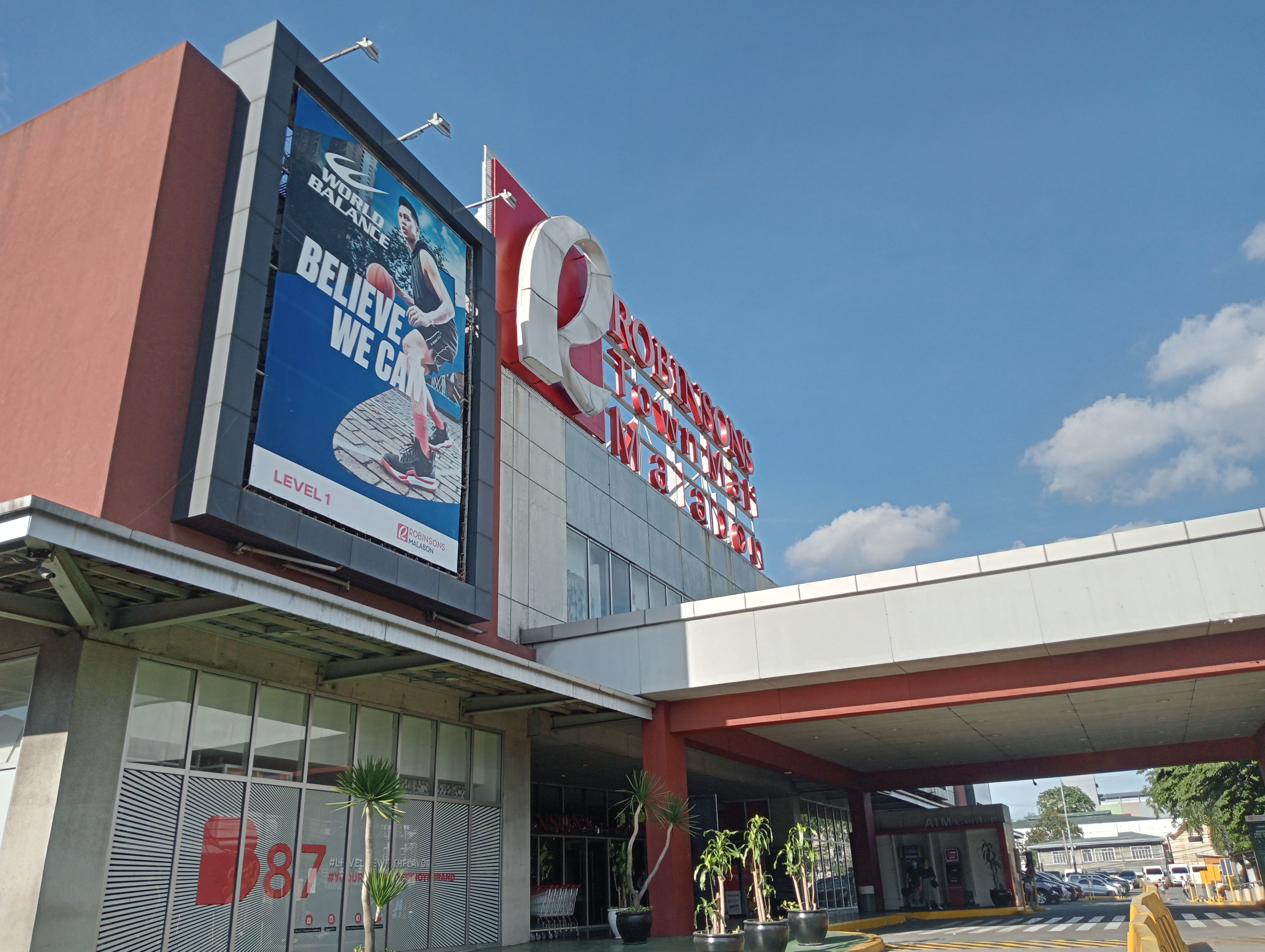
- Location: Tinajeros, Malabon, Philippines
- Coordinates: 14°40′9″N 120°57′59″E
- Address: Governor Pascual Avenue cor. Crispin Street
- Opened: December 4, 2013; 12 years ago
- Developer: JG Summit Holdings
- Manager: Robinsons Malls
- Owner: John Gokongwei
- Num. of stores: 250
- Num. of anchor tenants: 4
- Floor area: 17,104.83 m^{2} (184,114.9 sq ft)
- Floors: 2
- Website: Robinsons Town Mall Malabon

Robinsons Malabon (formerly known as Robinsons Town Mall Malabon), is a shopping mall located in Malabon, Metro Manila, Philippines. It is the first full service mall in Malabon owned and managed by Robinsons Land Corporation, the second largest mall operator in the Philippines. The mall was opened on December 4, 2013. It is the 33rd mall opened by Robinsons in the Philippines and the first and only Robinsons mall in Malabon and the whole Camanava (North Metro Manila) area.

== Description ==
Robinsons Malabon in 2015

Robinsons Malabon sits on a 23,000-square-metre (250,000 ft^{2}) lot on the intersection of Governor Pascual Avenue and Crispin Street in Tinajeros village. It has a gross leasable area of 17,104.83 square metres (184,114.9 ft^{2}) and can house over 250 tenants. The two-level shopping center is anchored. It also features a Lingkod Pinoy government services center. It is one of the two main shopping centers in Malabon along with Malabon Citisquare.
