= J&T Express (3x3 team) =

Former Filipino basketball team

- Leagues: PBA 3x3
- Founded: 2022
- Folded: 2024
- Team colors: Red, white
- Company: J&T Express

J&T Express was a Philippine 3x3 basketball team which competes in the PBA 3x3, organized by the Philippines' top-flight professional league, Philippine Basketball Association.

== History ==
J&T Express entered the PBA 3x3 in 2022 as a guest team. It is owned by logistics firm J&T Express, a longtime sponsor of the main PBA league. It unveiled its first ever team on September 6, 2022, with Ryan Monteclaro as playing coach.

They would take a leave of absence in the 2022–23 season. The team would never play again in the league which disbanded in 2024.
