= Samboy de Leon =

Filipino basketball player

Personal information
- Born: March 9, 1992 (age 34) Cabanatuan, Nueva Ecija, Philippines
- Listed height: 6 ft 3 in (1.91 m)
- Listed weight: 190 lb (86 kg)

Career information
- College: Centro Escolar University
- PBA draft: 2015: 4th round, 39th overall pick
- Drafted by: Star Hotshots
- Playing career: 2016–present
- Position: Small forward

Career history
- 2016–2017: Star Hotshots
- 2018: San Juan Knights
- 2018: Bacoor City Strikers
- 2018–2019: Navotas Clutch
- 2019: Iloilo United Royals
- 2019–2020: TNT KaTropa / TNT Tropang Giga
- 2025: Rizal Golden Coolers

Career highlights
- MPBL champion (2019); NAASCU Most Valuable Player (2014)

Rodel N. de Leon (born March 9, 1992) is a Filipino professional basketball player who last played for Rizal Golden Coolers of the Maharlika Pilipinas Basketball League (MPBL).

Prior to turning professional, he played for the Cafe France-CEU Bakers of the PBA Developmental League (PBA D-League). He was drafted with the 39th overall pick in the 2015 PBA draft by the Star Hotshots.

De Leon was part of the varsity teams of Far Eastern University from 2010 to 2012, but was relegated to Team B. He never got the chance to play in major collegiate tournaments, until he transferred to Centro Escolar University (CEU) in 2012.

He became one of the main men for the CEU Scorpions of the National Athletic Association of Schools, Colleges and Universities (NAASCU), where he was awarded the league MVP in 2014.

== PBA career statistics ==
Legend
GP	Games played	MPG	Minutes per game
FG%	Field-goal percentage	3P%	3-point field-goal percentage	FT%	Free-throw percentage
RPG	Rebounds per game	APG	Assists per game	SPG	Steals per game
BPG	Blocks per game	PPG	Points per game	**Bold**	Career high

As of the end of 2020 season

=== Season-by-season averages ===
Year	Team	GP	MPG	FG%	3P%	FT%	RPG	APG	SPG	BPG	PPG
2016–17	Star	5	5.1	.200	.125	—	2.2	.2	.0	.0	1.0
2019	TNT	**16**	9.2	**.382**	**.267**	.667	1.4	.6	.1	**.2**	2.0
2020	TNT	**16**	**10.6**	.323	.050	**.750**	**2.4**	**.7**	**.4**	**.2**	**2.3**
Career		37	9.2	.333	.140	.739	2.0	.6	.2	.2	2.0
