= 2022–23 PBA 3x3 season =

2nd PBA 3x3 season

- Duration: September 10, 2022 – February 26, 2023
- Number of teams: 12
- TV partner(s): Local: One Sports; TV5; PBA Rush (HD); International: AksyonTV International; Online: GigaPlay
- 1st Conference champions: TNT Tropang Giga
- 1st Conference runners-up: Platinum Karaoke
- 2nd Conference champions: TNT Tropang Giga
- 2nd Conference runners-up: Cavitex Braves
- 3rd Conference champions: TNT Tropang Giga
- 3rd Conference runners-up: San Miguel Beermen

Seasons
- ← 2021 2023–24 →

The 2022–23 PBA 3x3 season was the second season of the PBA 3x3, the 3x3 basketball league of the Philippine Basketball Association. TNT Tropang Giga completed the first ever PBA 3x3 Grand Slam by winning all conference Grand Finals.

== Teams ==
All 12 franchise teams of the main 5-a-side Philippine Basketball Association are eligible to field a 3x3 team for the 2022–23 PBA 3x3 season, although the Converge FiberXers, Phoenix Super LPG Fuel Masters, and Rain or Shine Elasto Painters did not field a team. The Blackwater Bossing, who did not field a team in the inaugural season, debuted this season under the team name Blackwater Bossing Red President. Three guest teams (J&T Express, Pioneer ElastoSeal Katibays, and Platinum Karaoke) participated, with J&T Express debuting this season. The Limitless Appmasters and Sista Super Sealers (3x3 affiliate teams of Phoenix Super LPG Fuel Masters and Rain or Shine Elasto Painters, respectively), as well as guest teams Master Sardines Fishing Champs and Zamboanga Valientes, who all appeared during the previous season, took a leave of absence for this season.

Team	Company	Coach
Barangay Ginebra San Miguel	Ginebra San Miguel, Inc.	
Blackwater Bossing Red President	Ever Bilena	
Cavitex Braves	Metro Pacific Investments Corporation	
J&T Express	Jet Express Co., Ltd.	
Meralco Bolts 3x3	Manila Electric Company	
NorthPort Batang Pier	Sultan 900 Capital, Inc.	
Pioneer ElastoSeal Katibays	Pioneer Epoxy Adhesives Inc.	
Platinum Karaoke	Vismay International Corporation	
Purefoods TJ Titans	San Miguel Food and Beverage, Inc.	
San Miguel Beermen	San Miguel Brewery, Inc.	
Terrafirma 3x3	Terrafirma Realty Development Corporation	
TNT Tropang Giga	Smart Communications	

== Format ==
The season's format was highly similar to that of the previous season. The season had three tournaments or conferences. Each conference had six two-day legs and a grand final. The 12 teams were divided into four pools, with each pool having three teams. Teams within their pools played in a single round-robin format. The top two teams of each pool directly qualified for the quarterfinals, with qualified teams from Pool A facing those from Pool C, and qualified teams from Pool B facing those from Pool D. The knockout stage was a single-elimination tournament and a third place game were also held. The winner of each leg received ₱100,000, the runner-up received ₱50,000, while the third placed team received ₱30,000. The seedings and pool compositions for each leg were based on the results of the preceding leg.

After six legs, the cumulative standings were calculated and the top four teams directly qualified for the quarterfinals of the Grand Finals. The fifth to tenth-placed teams qualified for the preliminary round of the Grand Finals. The bottom teams were not qualified for the Grand Finals. The Grand Champion gets ₱750,000, the runner-up gets ₱250,000, while the third placed team gets ₱100,000.

== First conference ==
The conference started on September 10 and ended on October 30, 2022.

=== Legs summary ===
Pos	Team	1st leg	2nd leg	3rd leg	4th leg	5th leg	6th leg	Pts	Qualification
1	TNT Tropang Giga	1st	3rd	4th	2nd	1st	1st	510	Qualification to Grand Finals quarterfinal round
2	Meralco Bolts 3x3	2nd	4th	1st	3rd	5th	4th	420	Qualification to Grand Finals quarterfinal round
3	J&T Express	4th	5th	2nd	5th	2nd	2nd	400	Qualification to Grand Finals quarterfinal round
4	Cavitex Braves	9th	1st	3rd	8th	3rd	3rd	365	Qualification to Grand Finals quarterfinal round
5	San Miguel Beermen	10th	2nd	5th	1st	11th	5th	314	Qualification to Grand Finals preliminary round
6	Platinum Karaoke	3rd	6th	6th	4th	8th	7th	295	Qualification to Grand Finals preliminary round
7	Pioneer ElastoSeal Katibays	6th	8th	7th	6th	4th	8th	260	Qualification to Grand Finals preliminary round
8	Blackwater Bossing Red President	5th	7th	10th	9th	6th	10th	191	Qualification to Grand Finals preliminary round
9	Barangay Ginebra San Miguel	11th	10th	8th	10th	7th	6th	172	Qualification to Grand Finals preliminary round
10	NorthPort Batang Pier	7th	11th	9th	7th	12th	9th	150	Qualification to Grand Finals preliminary round
11	Purefoods TJ Titans	8th	12th	11th	12th	9th	12th	113	
12	Terrafirma 3x3	12th	9th	12th	11th	10th	11th	98	

Source: PBA 3x3

=== Grand Finals ===
==== Preliminary round ====
===== Pool A =====
Pos	Team	Pld	W	L	PF	PA	PD	PCT	Qualification
1	San Miguel Beermen	2	2	0	42	33	+9	1.000	Quarterfinals
2	Barangay Ginebra San Miguel	2	1	1	36	37	−1	.500	Quarterfinals
3	Blackwater Bossing Red President	2	0	2	33	41	−8	.000	

Source: PBA 3x3
Rules for classification: 1) Wins; Win ratio if unequal number of games; 2) Head-to-head record; 3) Average points per game; 4) Higher seed.

===== Pool B =====
Pos	Team	Pld	W	L	PF	PA	PD	PCT	Qualification
1	Platinum Karaoke	2	2	0	40	36	+4	1.000	Quarterfinals
2	NorthPort Batang Pier	2	1	1	38	38	0	.500	Quarterfinals
3	Pioneer ElastoSeal Katibays	2	0	2	37	41	−4	.000	

Source: PBA 3x3
Rules for classification: 1) Wins; Win ratio if unequal number of games; 2) Head-to-head record; 3) Average points per game; 4) Higher seed.

==== Knockout stage ====
===== Bracket =====
Seed refers to the position of the team after six legs. Letter and number inside parentheses denotes the pool letter and pool position of the team, respectively, after the preliminary round of the Grand Finals.

Quarterfinals
1	TNT Tropang Giga	21
10 (B2)	NorthPort Batang Pier	11
5 (A1)	San Miguel Beermen	13
4	Cavitex Braves	21
2	Meralco Bolts 3x3	21
9 (A2)	Barangay Ginebra San Miguel	12
6 (B1)	Platinum Karaoke	19
3	J&T Express	15

Semifinals
1	TNT Tropang Giga	21
4	Cavitex Braves	16
2	Meralco Bolts 3x3	15
6 (B1)	Platinum Karaoke	16

Finals
1	TNT Tropang Giga	20
6 (B1)	Platinum Karaoke	17
Third place
4	Cavitex Braves	16
2	Meralco Bolts 3x3	11

== Second conference ==
The conference started on November 5 and ended on December 17, 2022.

=== Legs summary ===
Pos	Team	1st leg	2nd leg	3rd leg	4th leg	5th leg	6th leg	Pts	Qualification
1	Cavitex Braves	4th	3rd	2nd	2nd	1st	1st	490	Qualification to Grand Finals quarterfinal round
2	TNT Tropang Giga	1st	2nd	1st	5th	9th	2nd	430	Qualification to Grand Finals quarterfinal round
3	Platinum Karaoke	2nd	6th	6th	1st	2nd	3rd	420	Qualification to Grand Finals quarterfinal round
4	J&T Express	5th	1st	5th	3rd	5th	4th	380	Qualification to Grand Finals quarterfinal round
5	Barangay Ginebra San Miguel	3rd	4th	4th	7th	4th	7th	330	Qualification to Grand Finals preliminary round
6	Meralco Bolts 3x3	10th	9th	3rd	6th	8th	10th	206	Qualification to Grand Finals preliminary round
7	Pioneer ElastoSeal Katibays	11th	5th	12th	9th	3rd	8th	205	Qualification to Grand Finals preliminary round
8	Blackwater Bossing Red President	9th	10th	9th	4th	7th	6th	203	Qualification to Grand Finals preliminary round
9	San Miguel Beermen	6th	11th	10th	12th	6th	5th	188	Qualification to Grand Finals preliminary round
10	Terrafirma 3x3	8th	7th	8th	11th	10th	9th	164	Qualification to Grand Finals preliminary round
11	Purefoods TJ Titans	7th	8th	11th	10th	12th	11th	139	
12	NorthPort Batang Pier	12th	12th	7th	8th	11th	12th	133	

Source: PBA 3x3 Report

=== Grand Finals ===
==== Preliminary round ====
===== Pool A =====
Pos	Team	Pld	W	L	PF	PA	PD	PCT	Qualification
1	Blackwater Bossing Red President	2	2	0	40	35	+5	1.000	Quarterfinals
2	Barangay Ginebra San Miguel	2	1	1	36	36	0	.500	Quarterfinals
3	San Miguel Beermen	2	0	2	37	42	−5	.000	

Source: PBA 3x3
Rules for classification: 1) Wins; Win ratio if unequal number of games; 2) Head-to-head record; 3) Average points per game; 4) Higher seed.

===== Pool B =====
Pos	Team	Pld	W	L	PF	PA	PD	PCT	Qualification
1	Pioneer ElastoSeal Katibays	2	2	0	40	34	+6	1.000	Quarterfinals
2	Meralco Bolts 3x3	2	1	1	38	28	+10	.500	Quarterfinals
3	Terrafirma 3x3	2	0	2	26	42	−16	.000	

Source: PBA 3x3
Rules for classification: 1) Wins; Win ratio if unequal number of games; 2) Head-to-head record; 3) Average points per game; 4) Higher seed.

==== Knockout stage ====
===== Bracket =====
Seed refers to the position of the team after six legs. Letter and number inside parentheses denotes the pool letter and pool position of the team, respectively, after the preliminary round of the Grand Finals.

Quarterfinals
1	Cavitex Braves	21
6 (B2)	Meralco Bolts 3x3	20
8 (A1)	Blackwater Bossing Red President	11
4	J&T Express	18
5 (A2)	Barangay Ginebra San Miguel	16
2	TNT Tropang Giga	20
3	Platinum Karaoke	14
7 (B1)	Pioneer ElastoSeal Katibays	13

Semifinals
1	Cavitex Braves	16
4	J&T Express	10
2	TNT Tropang Giga	18
3	Platinum Karaoke	13

Finals
1	Cavitex Braves	17
2	TNT Tropang Giga	19
Third place
4	J&T Express	20
3	Platinum Karaoke	14

== Third conference ==
The conference started on January 14 and ended on February 26, 2023.

=== Legs summary ===
Pos	Team	1st leg	2nd leg	3rd leg	4th leg	5th leg	6th leg	Pts	Qualification
1	TNT Tropang Giga	4th	1st	5th	3rd	3rd	2nd	430	Qualification to Grand Finals quarterfinal round
2	Cavitex Braves	3rd	4th	6th	1st	2nd	4th	415	Qualification to Grand Finals quarterfinal round
3	Meralco Bolts 3x3	8th	3rd	3rd	5th	4th	3rd	355	Qualification to Grand Finals quarterfinal round
4	Barangay Ginebra San Miguel	5th	2nd	1st	7th	7th	7th	350	Qualification to Grand Finals quarterfinal round
5	Platinum Karaoke	9th	10th	2nd	4th	1st	6th	323	Qualification to Grand Finals preliminary round
6	J&T Express	6th	6th	4th	8th	11th	1st	301	Qualification to Grand Finals preliminary round
7	Pioneer ElastoSeal Katibays	2nd	9th	8th	2nd	12th	8th	264	Qualification to Grand Finals preliminary round
8	San Miguel Beermen	1st	5th	11th	10th	5th	12th	248	Qualification to Grand Finals preliminary round
9	Blackwater Bossing Red President	10th	7th	10th	6th	9th	5th	191	Qualification to Grand Finals preliminary round
10	Purefoods TJ Titans	7th	8th	9th	9th	6th	9th	180	Qualification to Grand Finals preliminary round
11	Terrafirma 3x3	11th	12th	7th	12th	10th	10th	120	
12	NorthPort Batang Pier	12th	11th	12th	11th	8th	11th	111	

Source: PBA 3x3 Report

=== Grand Finals ===
==== Preliminary round ====
===== Pool A =====
Pos	Team	Pld	W	L	PF	PA	PD	PCT	Qualification
1	Platinum Karaoke	2	1	1	40	35	+5	.500	Quarterfinals
2	San Miguel Beermen	2	1	1	37	40	−3	.500	Quarterfinals
3	Blackwater Bossing Red President	2	1	1	36	38	−2	.500	

Source: PBA 3x3
Rules for classification: 1) Wins; Win ratio if unequal number of games; 2) Head-to-head record; 3) Average points per game; 4) Higher seed.

===== Pool B =====
Pos	Team	Pld	W	L	PF	PA	PD	PCT	Qualification
1	J&T Express	2	2	0	38	24	+14	1.000	Quarterfinals
2	Purefoods TJ Titans	2	1	1	32	31	+1	.500	Quarterfinals
3	Pioneer ElastoSeal Katibays	2	0	2	23	38	−15	.000	

Source: PBA 3x3
Rules for classification: 1) Wins; Win ratio if unequal number of games; 2) Head-to-head record; 3) Average points per game; 4) Higher seed.

==== Knockout stage ====
===== Bracket =====
Seed refers to the position of the team after six legs. Letter and number inside parentheses denotes the pool letter and pool position of the team, respectively, after the preliminary round of the Grand Finals.

Quarterfinals
1	TNT Tropang Giga	21
10 (B2)	Purefoods TJ Titans	15
5 (A1)	Platinum Karaoke	15
4	Barangay Ginebra San Miguel	16
8 (A2)	San Miguel Beermen	21
2	Cavitex Braves	19
3	Meralco Bolts 3x3	13
6 (B1)	J&T Express	14

Semifinals
1	TNT Tropang Giga	21
4	Barangay Ginebra San Miguel	16
8 (A2)	San Miguel Beermen	20
6 (B1)	J&T Express	18

Finals
1	TNT Tropang Giga	21
8 (A2)	San Miguel Beermen	18
Third place
4	Barangay Ginebra San Miguel	21
6 (B1)	J&T Express	18
