= 2023–24 PBA 3x3 season – Second conference =

Second conference of the 2023–24 PBA 3x3 season

The second conference of the 2023–24 PBA 3x3 season started on October 16 and ended on November 27, 2023. It consisted of six two-day legs and a grand final. TNT Triple Giga became the Grand Champion for the sixth straight conference after defeating Meralco Bolts 3x3 in the Grand Finals, 21–20, in overtime.

== Teams ==
The players listed have played in at least one of the legs.

Team	Players					
Barangay Ginebra San Miguel	Franz Abuda	JJ Espanola	Jerick Fabian	Lean Martel	Ralph Salcedo	Nichole Ubalde
Blackwater Smooth Razor	Dariel Bayla	Kristian Bernardo	Hubert Cani	Wendell Comboy	RJ Deles	Rey Publico
Cavitex Braves	Bong Galanza	Tonino Gonzaga	Kenneth Ighalo	Marion Magat	Jorey Napoles	
MCFASolver Tech Centrale	Yutien Andrada	Raphael Banal	Brandon Ramirez	Nico Salva	Terrence Tumalip	Louie Vigil
Meralco Bolts 3x3	Alfred Batino	Red Cachuela	Reymar Caduyac	Jeff Manday	Joseph Manlangit	Joseph Sedurifa
NorthPort Batang Pier	JR Alabanza	Johnnel Bauzon	Jebb Bulawan	Gwyne Capacio	Jan Sobrevega	Dexter Zamora
Pioneer ElastoSeal Katibays	Gian Abrigo	Wilson Baltazar	Enrique Caunan	Kenneth Mocon	Reggie Morido	Dennice Villamor
Purefoods TJ Titans	Christian Buñag	Martin Gozum	Rey Peralta	Buenaventura Raflores	Christian Rivera	Richard Velchez
San Miguel Beermen	John Apacible	Monbert Arong	Jaypee Belencion	Ken Bono	Christian Caldozo	Marvin Lee
Terrafirma 3x3	Shaq Alanes	Andre Duremdes	Mark Anthony Francisco	Jordan Rios	Jeremiah Taladua	Jason Tan
TNT Triple Giga	Samboy de Leon	Chris Exciminiano	Gryann Mendoza	Chester Saldua	Matt Salem	Almond Vosotros

== 1st leg ==
=== Groupings ===
Pool A	Pool B	Pool C
Cavitex Braves; Pioneer ElastoSeal Katibays; Blackwater Smooth Razor	TNT Tropang Giga; San Miguel Beermen; NorthPort Batang Pier; MCFASolver Tech Centrale	Barangay Ginebra San Miguel; Meralco Bolts 3x3 Terrafirma 3x3 Purefoods TJ Titans

=== Preliminary round ===
==== Pool A ====
Pos	Team	Pld	W	L	PF	PA	PD	PCT	Qualification
1	Cavitex Braves	2	2	0	40	27	+13	1.000	Quarterfinals
2	Blackwater Smooth Razor	2	1	1	34	30	+4	.500	Quarterfinals
3	Pioneer ElastoSeal Katibays	2	0	2	22	39	−17	.000	

Source: PBA 3x3
Rules for classification: 1) Wins; Win ratio if unequal number of games; 2) Head-to-head record; 3) Average points per game; 4) Higher seed.

October 16
10:30 am

Report

Cavitex Braves	22–13	Blackwater Smooth Razor

Ayala Malls Circuit

October 16
11:45 am

Report

Pioneer ElastoSeal Katibays	8–21	Blackwater Smooth Razor

Ayala Malls Circuit

October 16
1:00 pm

Report

Cavitex Braves	18–14	Pioneer ElastoSeal Katibays

Ayala Malls Circuit

==== Pool B ====
Pos	Team	Pld	W	L	PF	PA	PD	PCT	Qualification
1	TNT Triple Giga	3	3	0	63	52	+11	1.000	Quarterfinals
2	MCFASolver Tech Centrale	3	1	2	58	58	0	.333	Quarterfinals
3	San Miguel Beermen	3	1	2	48	55	−7	.333	Quarterfinals
4	NorthPort Batang Pier	3	1	2	47	51	−4	.333	

Source: PBA 3x3
Rules for classification: 1) Wins; Win ratio if unequal number of games; 2) Head-to-head record; 3) Average points per game; 4) Higher seed.

October 16
10:55 am

Report

San Miguel Beermen	14–12	NorthPort Batang Pier

Ayala Malls Circuit

October 16
12:10 pm

Report

TNT Triple Giga	21–20	MCFASolver Tech Centrale

Ayala Malls Circuit

October 16
1:25 pm

Report

MCFASolver Tech Centrale	16–21	NorthPort Batang Pier

Ayala Malls Circuit

October 16
2:15 pm

Report

San Miguel Beermen	18–21	TNT Triple Giga

Ayala Malls Circuit

October 16
3:05 pm

Report

NorthPort Batang Pier	14–21	TNT Triple Giga

Ayala Malls Circuit

October 17
10:30 am

Report

San Miguel Beermen	16–22	MCFASolver Tech Centrale

Ayala Malls Circuit

==== Pool C ====
Pos	Team	Pld	W	L	PF	PA	PD	PCT	Qualification
1	Meralco Bolts 3x3	3	2	1	56	50	+6	.667	Quarterfinals
2	Barangay Ginebra San Miguel	3	2	1	50	48	+2	.667	Quarterfinals
3	Purefoods TJ Titans	3	2	1	49	44	+5	.667	Quarterfinals
4	Terrafirma 3x3	3	0	3	40	53	−13	.000	

Source: PBA 3x3
Rules for classification: 1) Wins; Win ratio if unequal number of games; 2) Head-to-head record; 3) Average points per game; 4) Higher seed.

October 16
11:20 am

Report

Barangay Ginebra San Miguel	16–17	Purefoods TJ Titans

Ayala Malls Circuit

October 16
12:35 pm

Report

Meralco Bolts 3x3	21–16	Terrafirma 3x3

Ayala Malls Circuit

October 16
1:50 pm

Report

Purefoods TJ Titans	19–12	Terrafirma 3x3

Ayala Malls Circuit

October 16
2:40 pm

Report

Meralco Bolts 3x3	19–21	Barangay Ginebra San Miguel

Ayala Malls Circuit

October 16
3:30 pm

Report

Meralco Bolts 3x3	16–13	Purefoods TJ Titans

Ayala Malls Circuit

October 17
10:55 am

Report

Terrafirma 3x3	12–13	Barangay Ginebra San Miguel

Ayala Malls Circuit

=== Knockout stage ===
TNT Triple Giga defeated Cavitex Braves in the finals, 18–16, to become the first leg winners.

==== Bracket ====
Quarterfinals
A1	Cavitex Braves	21
B3	San Miguel Beermen	17
C2	Barangay Ginebra San Miguel	20
B2	MCFASolver Tech Centrale	21
B1	TNT Triple Giga	19
C3	Purefoods TJ Titans	14
C1	Meralco Bolts 3x3	18
A2	Blackwater Smooth Razor	15

Semifinals
A1	Cavitex Braves	21
B2	MCFASolver Tech Centrale	10
B1	TNT Triple Giga	22
C1	Meralco Bolts 3x3	18

Finals
A1	Cavitex Braves	16
B1	TNT Triple Giga	18
Third place
B2	MCFASolver Tech Centrale	13
C1	Meralco Bolts 3x3	21

==== Quarterfinals ====
October 17
11:20 am

Report

Cavitex Braves	21–17	San Miguel Beermen

Ayala Malls Circuit

October 17
11:45 am

Report

Barangay Ginebra San Miguel	20–21	MCFASolver Tech Centrale

Ayala Malls Circuit

October 17
12:10 pm

Report

TNT Triple Giga	19–14	Purefoods TJ Titans

Ayala Malls Circuit

October 17
12:35 pm

Report

Meralco Bolts 3x3	18–15	Blackwater Smooth Razor

Ayala Malls Circuit

==== Semifinals ====
October 17
1:00 pm

Report

Cavitex Braves	21–10	MCFASolver Tech Centrale

Ayala Malls Circuit

October 17
1:25 pm

Report

TNT Triple Giga	22–18	Meralco Bolts 3x3

Ayala Malls Circuit

==== Third place game ====
October 17
2:10 pm

Report

MCFASolver Tech Centrale	13–21	Meralco Bolts 3x3

Ayala Malls Circuit

==== Finals ====
October 17
2:35 pm

Report

Cavitex Braves	16–18	TNT Triple Giga

Ayala Malls Circuit

=== Final standings ===
Pos	Team	Pld	W	L	PCT	AVG	PF	Tour points
1	TNT Triple Giga	6	6	0	1.000	20.3	122	100
2	Cavitex Braves	5	4	1	.800	19.6	98	80
3	Meralco Bolts 3x3	6	4	2	.667	18.8	113	70
4	MCFASolver Tech Centrale	6	2	4	.333	17.0	102	60
Eliminated at the quarterfinals
5	Barangay Ginebra San Miguel	4	2	2	.500	17.5	70	50
6	Purefoods TJ Titans	4	2	2	.500	15.8	63	45
7	Blackwater Smooth Razor	3	1	2	.333	16.3	49	40
8	San Miguel Beermen	4	1	3	.250	16.3	65	35
Eliminated at the preliminary round
9	NorthPort Batang Pier	3	1	2	.333	15.7	47	20
10	Terrafirma 3x3	3	0	3	.000	13.3	40	18
11	Pioneer ElastoSeal Katibays	2	0	2	.000	11.0	22	16

Source: PBA 3x3

== 2nd leg ==
=== Groupings ===
Pool A	Pool B	Pool C
TNT Tropang Giga (1); Purefoods TJ Titans (6); Blackwater Smooth Razor (7)	Cavitex Braves (2); Barangay Ginebra San Miguel (5); San Miguel Beermen (8); Pioneer ElastoSeal Katibays (11)	Meralco Bolts 3x3 (3); MCFASolver Tech Centrale (4); NorthPort Batang Pier (9); Terrafirma 3x3 (10)

=== Preliminary round ===
==== Pool A ====
Pos	Team	Pld	W	L	PF	PA	PD	PCT	Qualification
1	TNT Triple Giga	2	2	0	42	31	+11	1.000	Quarterfinals
2	Blackwater Smooth Razor	2	1	1	36	36	0	.500	Quarterfinals
3	Purefoods TJ Titans	2	0	2	30	41	−11	.000	

Source: PBA 3x3
Rules for classification: 1) Wins; Win ratio if unequal number of games; 2) Head-to-head record; 3) Average points per game; 4) Higher seed.

October 23
11:20 am

Report

TNT Triple Giga	21–16	Blackwater Smooth Razor

Ayala Malls Circuit

October 23
12:35 pm

Report

Purefoods TJ Titans	15–20	Blackwater Smooth Razor

Ayala Malls Circuit

October 23
2:40 pm

Report

Purefoods TJ Titans	15–21	TNT Triple Giga

Ayala Malls Circuit

==== Pool B ====
Pos	Team	Pld	W	L	PF	PA	PD	PCT	Qualification
1	Cavitex Braves	3	2	1	51	49	+2	.667 (Note: Cavitex Braves 1–0 Pioneer ElastoSeal Katibays)	Quarterfinals
2	Pioneer ElastoSeal Katibays	3	2	1	44	44	0	.667	Quarterfinals
3	San Miguel Beermen	3	1	2	54	54	0	.333 (Note: San Miguel Beermen 1–0 Barangay Ginebra San Miguel)	Quarterfinals
4	Barangay Ginebra San Miguel	3	1	2	47	49	−2	.333	

Source: PBA 3x3
Rules for classification: 1) Wins; Win ratio if unequal number of games; 2) Head-to-head record; 3) Average points per game; 4) Higher seed.
Notes:

October 23
10:30 am

Report

Barangay Ginebra San Miguel	16–20	San Miguel Beermen

Ayala Malls Circuit

October 23
11:45 am

Report

Cavitex Braves	16–12	Pioneer ElastoSeal Katibays

Ayala Malls Circuit

October 23
1:00 pm

Report

Pioneer ElastoSeal Katibays	16–14	San Miguel Beermen

Ayala Malls Circuit

October 23
1:50 pm

Report

Cavitex Braves	13–17	Barangay Ginebra San Miguel

Ayala Malls Circuit

October 23
3:05 pm

Report

San Miguel Beermen	20–22	Cavitex Braves

Ayala Malls Circuit

October 24
10:30 am

Report

Barangay Ginebra San Miguel	14–16	Pioneer ElastoSeal Katibays

Ayala Malls Circuit

==== Pool C ====
Pos	Team	Pld	W	L	PF	PA	PD	PCT	Qualification
1	Meralco Bolts 3x3	3	3	0	58	37	+21	1.000	Quarterfinals
2	MCFASolver Tech Centrale	3	2	1	53	49	+4	.667	Quarterfinals
3	Terrafirma 3x3	3	1	2	37	54	−17	.333	Quarterfinals
4	NorthPort Batang Pier	3	0	3	44	52	−8	.000	

Source: PBA 3x3
Rules for classification: 1) Wins; Win ratio if unequal number of games; 2) Head-to-head record; 3) Average points per game; 4) Higher seed.

October 23
10:55 am

Report

Terrafirma 3x3	16–13	NorthPort Batang Pier

Ayala Malls Circuit

October 23
12:10 pm

Report

MCFASolver Tech Centrale	20–10	Terrafirma 3x3

Ayala Malls Circuit

October 23
1:25 pm

Report

Terrafirma 3x3	11–21	Meralco Bolts 3x3

Ayala Malls Circuit

October 23
2:15 pm

Report

NorthPort Batang Pier	18–20	MCFASolver Tech Centrale

Ayala Malls Circuit

October 23
3:30 pm

Report

Meralco Bolts 3x3	21–13	MCFASolver Tech Centrale

Ayala Malls Circuit

October 24
10:55 am

Report

NorthPort Batang Pier	13–16	Meralco Bolts 3x3

Ayala Malls Circuit

=== Knockout stage ===
TNT Triple Giga defeated Terrafirma Dyip in the finals, 21–11, to become the second leg winners.

==== Bracket ====
Quarterfinals
A1	TNT Triple Giga	21
B3	San Miguel Beermen	15
C2	MCFASolver Tech Centrale	18
B2	Pioneer ElastoSeal Katibays	21
B1	Cavitex Braves	19
C3	Terrafirma 3x3	20
C1	Meralco Bolts 3x3	16
A2	Blackwater Smooth Razor	18

Semifinals
A1	TNT Triple Giga	20
B2	Pioneer ElastoSeal Katibays	19
C3	Terrafirma 3x3	21
A2	Blackwater Smooth Razor	16

Finals
A1	TNT Triple Giga	21
C3	Terrafirma 3x3	11
Third place
B2	Pioneer ElastoSeal Katibays	22
A2	Blackwater Smooth Razor	18

==== Quarterfinals ====
October 24
11:20 am

Report

TNT Triple Giga	21–15	San Miguel Beermen

Ayala Malls Circuit

October 24
11:45 am

Report

MCFASolver Tech Centrale	18–21	Pioneer ElastoSeal Katibays

Ayala Malls Circuit

October 24
12:10 pm

Report

Cavitex Braves	19–20	Terrafirma 3x3

Ayala Malls Circuit

October 24
12:35 pm

Report

Meralco Bolts 3x3	16–18	Blackwater Smooth Razor

Ayala Malls Circuit

==== Semifinals ====
October 24
1:00 pm

Report

TNT Triple Giga	20–19	Pioneer ElastoSeal Katibays

Ayala Malls Circuit

October 24
1:25 pm

Report

Terrafirma 3x3	21–16	Blackwater Smooth Razor

Ayala Malls Circuit

==== Third place game ====
October 24
2:10 pm

Report

Pioneer ElastoSeal Katibays	22–18	Blackwater Smooth Razor

Ayala Malls Circuit

==== Finals ====
October 24
2:35 pm

Report

TNT Triple Giga	21–11	Terrafirma 3x3

Ayala Malls Circuit

=== Final standings ===
Pos	Team	Pld	W	L	PCT	AVG	PF	Tour points
1	TNT Triple Giga	5	5	0	1.000	20.8	104	100
2	Terrafirma 3x3	6	3	3	.500	14.8	89	80
3	Pioneer ElastoSeal Katibays	6	4	2	.667	17.7	106	70
4	Blackwater Smooth Razor	5	2	3	.400	17.6	88	60
Eliminated at the quarterfinals
5	Meralco Bolts 3x3	4	3	1	.750	18.5	74	50
6	MCFASolver Tech Centrale	4	2	2	.500	17.8	71	45
7	Cavitex Braves	4	2	2	.500	17.5	70	40
8	San Miguel Beermen	4	1	3	.250	17.3	69	35
Eliminated at the preliminary round
9	Barangay Ginebra San Miguel	3	1	2	.333	15.7	47	20
10	Purefoods TJ Titans	2	0	2	.000	15.0	30	18
11	NorthPort Batang Pier	3	0	3	.000	14.7	44	16

Source: PBA 3x3

== 3rd leg ==
=== Groupings ===
Pool A	Pool B	Pool C
TNT Tropang Giga (1); MCFASolver Tech Centrale (6); Cavitex Braves (7)	Terrafirma 3x3 (2); Meralco Bolts 3x3 (5); San Miguel Beermen (8); NorthPort Batang Pier (11)	Pioneer ElastoSeal Katibays (3); Blackwater Smooth Razor (4); Barangay Ginebra San Miguel (9); Purefoods TJ Titans (10)

=== Preliminary round ===
==== Pool A ====
Pos	Team	Pld	W	L	PF	PA	PD	PCT	Qualification
1	TNT Triple Giga	2	2	0	41	36	+5	1.000	Quarterfinals
2	Cavitex Braves	2	1	1	38	38	0	.500	Quarterfinals
3	MCFASolver Tech Centrale	2	0	2	37	42	−5	.000	

Source: PBA 3x3
Rules for classification: 1) Wins; Win ratio if unequal number of games; 2) Head-to-head record; 3) Average points per game; 4) Higher seed.

October 30
11:20 am

Report

TNT Triple Giga	20–17	Cavitex Braves

Fairview Terraces

October 30
12:35 pm

Report

MCFASolver Tech Centrale	18–21	Cavitex Braves

Fairview Terraces

October 30
1:50 pm

Report

TNT Triple Giga	21–19	MCFASolver Tech Centrale

Fairview Terraces

==== Pool B ====
Pos	Team	Pld	W	L	PF	PA	PD	PCT	Qualification
1	Meralco Bolts 3x3	3	3	0	59	44	+15	1.000	Quarterfinals
2	Terrafirma 3x3	3	2	1	59	56	+3	.667	Quarterfinals
3	NorthPort Batang Pier	3	1	2	54	50	+4	.333	Quarterfinals
4	San Miguel Beermen	3	0	3	37	59	−22	.000	

Source: PBA 3x3
Rules for classification: 1) Wins; Win ratio if unequal number of games; 2) Head-to-head record; 3) Average points per game; 4) Higher seed.

October 30
10:30 am

Report

Meralco Bolts 3x3	19–18	NorthPort Batang Pier

Fairview Terraces

October 30
11:45 am

Report

NorthPort Batang Pier	17–10	San Miguel Beermen

Fairview Terraces

October 30
1:00 pm

Report

Terrafirma 3x3	17–19	Meralco Bolts 3x3

Fairview Terraces

October 30
2:15 pm

Report

Meralco Bolts 3x3	21–9	San Miguel Beermen

Fairview Terraces

October 30
3:05 pm

Report

Terrafirma 3x3	21–19	NorthPort Batang Pier

Fairview Terraces

October 31
10:30 am

Report

San Miguel Beermen	18–21	Terrafirma 3x3

Fairview Terraces

==== Pool C ====
Pos	Team	Pld	W	L	PF	PA	PD	PCT	Qualification
1	Purefoods TJ Titans	3	3	0	62	57	+5	1.000	Quarterfinals
2	Pioneer ElastoSeal Katibays	3	2	1	54	50	+4	.667	Quarterfinals
3	Blackwater Smooth Razor	3	1	2	57	58	−1	.333	Quarterfinals
4	Barangay Ginebra San Miguel	3	0	3	50	58	−8	.000	

Source: PBA 3x3
Rules for classification: 1) Wins; Win ratio if unequal number of games; 2) Head-to-head record; 3) Average points per game; 4) Higher seed.

October 30
10:55 am

Report

Purefoods TJ Titans	21–18	Barangay Ginebra San Miguel

Fairview Terraces

October 30
12:10 pm

Report

Barangay Ginebra San Miguel	12–16	Pioneer ElastoSeal Katibays

Fairview Terraces

October 30
1:25 pm

Report

Pioneer ElastoSeal Katibays	18–17	Blackwater Smooth Razor

Fairview Terraces

October 30
2:40 pm

Report

Blackwater Smooth Razor	21–20	Barangay Ginebra San Miguel

Fairview Terraces

October 30
3:30 pm

Report

Pioneer ElastoSeal Katibays	20–21	Purefoods TJ Titans

Fairview Terraces

October 31
10:55 am

Report

Blackwater Smooth Razor	19–20	Purefoods TJ Titans

Fairview Terraces

=== Knockout stage ===
TNT Triple Giga defeated Cavitex Braves in the finals, 21–12, to become the third leg winners.

==== Bracket ====
Quarterfinals
A1	TNT Triple Giga	18
B3	NorthPort Batang Pier	15
C2	Pioneer ElastoSeal Katibays	21
B2	Terrafirma 3x3	10
B1	Meralco Bolts 3x3	21
C3	Blackwater Smooth Razor	13
C1	Purefoods TJ Titans	14
A2	Cavitex Braves	20

Semifinals
A1	TNT Triple Giga	21
C2	Pioneer ElastoSeal Katibays	18
B1	Meralco Bolts 3x3	19
A2	Cavitex Braves	21

Finals
A1	TNT Triple Giga	21
A2	Cavitex Braves	12
Third place
C2	Pioneer ElastoSeal Katibays	16
B1	Meralco Bolts 3x3	21

==== Quarterfinals ====
October 31
11:20 am

Report

TNT Triple Giga	18–15	NorthPort Batang Pier

Fairview Terraces

October 31
11:45 am

Report

Pioneer ElastoSeal Katibays	21–10	Terrafirma 3x3

Fairview Terraces

October 31
12:10 pm

Report

Meralco Bolts 3x3	21–13	Blackwater Smooth Razor

Fairview Terraces

October 31
12:35 pm

Report

Purefoods TJ Titans	14–20	Cavitex Braves

Fairview Terraces

==== Semifinals ====
October 31
1:00 pm

Report

TNT Triple Giga	21–18	Pioneer ElastoSeal Katibays

Fairview Terraces

October 31
1:25 pm

Report

Meralco Bolts 3x3	19–21	Cavitex Braves

Fairview Terraces

==== Third place game ====
October 31
2:10 pm

Report

Pioneer ElastoSeal Katibays	16–21	Meralco Bolts 3x3

Fairview Terraces

==== Finals ====
October 31
2:35 pm

Report

TNT Triple Giga	21–12	Cavitex Braves

Fairview Terraces

=== Final standings ===
Pos	Team	Pld	W	L	PCT	AVG	PF	Tour points
1	TNT Triple Giga	5	5	0	1.000	20.2	101	100
2	Cavitex Braves	5	3	2	.600	18.2	91	80
3	Meralco Bolts 3x3	6	5	1	.833	20.0	120	70
4	Pioneer ElastoSeal Katibays	6	3	3	.500	18.2	109	60
Eliminated at the quarterfinals
5	Purefoods TJ Titans	4	3	1	.750	19.0	76	50
6	Terrafirma 3x3	4	2	2	.500	17.3	69	45
7	Blackwater Smooth Razor	4	1	3	.250	17.5	70	40
8	NorthPort Batang Pier	4	1	3	.250	17.3	69	35
Eliminated at the preliminary round
9	MCFASolver Tech Centrale	2	0	2	.000	18.5	37	20
10	Barangay Ginebra San Miguel	3	0	3	.000	16.7	50	18
11	San Miguel Beermen	3	0	3	.000	12.3	37	16

Source: PBA 3x3

== 4th leg ==
=== Groupings ===
Pool A	Pool B	Pool C
TNT Tropang Giga (1); Terrafirma 3x3 (6); Blackwater Smooth Razor (7)	Cavitex Braves (2); Purefoods TJ Titans (5); NorthPort Batang Pier (8); San Miguel Beermen (11)	Meralco Bolts 3x3 (3); Pioneer ElastoSeal Katibays (4); MCFASolver Tech Centrale (9); Barangay Ginebra San Miguel (10)

=== Preliminary round ===
==== Pool A ====
Pos	Team	Pld	W	L	PF	PA	PD	PCT	Qualification
1	TNT Triple Giga	2	2	0	40	31	+9	1.000	Quarterfinals
2	Blackwater Smooth Razor	2	1	1	38	33	+5	.500	Quarterfinals
3	Terrafirma 3x3	2	0	2	28	42	−14	.000	

Source: PBA 3x3
Rules for classification: 1) Wins; Win ratio if unequal number of games; 2) Head-to-head record; 3) Average points per game; 4) Higher seed.

November 6
11:20 am

Report

TNT Triple Giga	19–17	Blackwater Smooth Razor

Ayala Malls Manila Bay

November 6
12:35 pm

Report

Terrafirma 3x3	14–21	Blackwater Smooth Razor

Ayala Malls Manila Bay

November 6
1:50 pm

Report

TNT Triple Giga	21–14	Terrafirma 3x3

Ayala Malls Manila Bay

==== Pool B ====
Pos	Team	Pld	W	L	PF	PA	PD	PCT	Qualification
1	San Miguel Beermen	3	3	0	64	52	+12	1.000	Quarterfinals
2	Cavitex Braves	3	2	1	59	54	+5	.667	Quarterfinals
3	Purefoods TJ Titans	3	1	2	58	56	+2	.333	Quarterfinals
4	NorthPort Batang Pier	3	0	3	44	63	−19	.000	

Source: PBA 3x3
Rules for classification: 1) Wins; Win ratio if unequal number of games; 2) Head-to-head record; 3) Average points per game; 4) Higher seed.

November 6
10:30 am

Report

Cavitex Braves	21–18	Purefoods TJ Titans

Ayala Malls Manila Bay

November 6
11:45 am

Report

San Miguel Beermen	22–17	Cavitex Braves

Ayala Malls Manila Bay

November 6
1:00 pm

Report

San Miguel Beermen	21–16	NorthPort Batang Pier

Ayala Malls Manila Bay

November 6
2:15 pm

Report

NorthPort Batang Pier	14–21	Cavitex Braves

Ayala Malls Manila Bay

November 6
3:05 pm

Report

Purefoods TJ Titans	19–21	San Miguel Beermen

Ayala Malls Manila Bay

November 7
10:30 am

Report

Purefoods TJ Titans	21–14	NorthPort Batang Pier

Ayala Malls Manila Bay

==== Pool C ====
Pos	Team	Pld	W	L	PF	PA	PD	PCT	Qualification
1	Pioneer ElastoSeal Katibays	3	3	0	53	49	+4	1.000	Quarterfinals
2	MCFASolver Tech Centrale	3	2	1	52	40	+12	.667	Quarterfinals
3	Meralco Bolts 3x3	3	1	2	48	55	−7	.333	Quarterfinals
4	Barangay Ginebra San Miguel	3	0	3	45	54	−9	.000	

Source: PBA 3x3
Rules for classification: 1) Wins; Win ratio if unequal number of games; 2) Head-to-head record; 3) Average points per game; 4) Higher seed.

November 6
10:55 am

Report

MCFASolver Tech Centrale	18–10	Meralco Bolts 3x3

Ayala Malls Manila Bay

November 6
12:10 pm

Report

MCFASolver Tech Centrale	15–16	Pioneer ElastoSeal Katibays

Ayala Malls Manila Bay

November 6
1:25 pm

Report

Meralco Bolts 3x3	19–16	Barangay Ginebra San Miguel

Ayala Malls Manila Bay

November 6
2:40 pm

Report

Barangay Ginebra San Miguel	14–19	MCFASolver Tech Centrale

Ayala Malls Manila Bay

November 6
3:30 pm

Report

Meralco Bolts 3x3	19–21	Pioneer ElastoSeal Katibays

Ayala Malls Manila Bay

November 7
10:55 am

Report

Pioneer ElastoSeal Katibays	16–15	Barangay Ginebra San Miguel

Ayala Malls Manila Bay

=== Knockout stage ===
MCFASolver Tech Centrale defeated TNT Triple Giga in the finals, 21–20, to become the fourth leg winners.

==== Bracket ====
Quarterfinals
A1	TNT Triple Giga	21
B3	Purefoods TJ Titans	20
C2	MCFASolver Tech Centrale	12
B2	Cavitex Braves	10
B1	San Miguel Beermen	17
C3	Meralco Bolts 3x3	20
C1	Pioneer ElastoSeal Katibays	18
A2	Blackwater Smooth Razor	15

Semifinals
A1	TNT Triple Giga	18
C2	MCFASolver Tech Centrale	20
C3	Meralco Bolts 3x3	15
C1	Pioneer ElastoSeal Katibays	14

Finals
C2	MCFASolver Tech Centrale	21
C3	Meralco Bolts 3x3	20
Third place
A1	TNT Triple Giga	14
C1	Pioneer ElastoSeal Katibays	21

==== Quarterfinals ====
November 7
11:20 am

Report

TNT Triple Giga	21–20	Purefoods TJ Titans

Ayala Malls Manila Bay

November 7
11:45 am

Report

MCFASolver Tech Centrale	12–10	Cavitex Braves

Ayala Malls Manila Bay

November 7
12:10 pm

Report

San Miguel Beermen	17–20	Meralco Bolts 3x3

Ayala Malls Manila Bay

November 7
12:35 pm

Report

Pioneer ElastoSeal Katibays	18–15	Blackwater Smooth Razor

Ayala Malls Manila Bay

==== Semifinals ====
November 7
1:00 pm

Report

TNT Triple Giga	18–20	MCFASolver Tech Centrale

Ayala Malls Manila Bay

November 7
1:25 pm

Report

Meralco Bolts 3x3	15–14	Pioneer ElastoSeal Katibays

Ayala Malls Manila Bay

==== Third place game ====
November 7
2:10 pm

Report

TNT Triple Giga	14–21	Pioneer ElastoSeal Katibays

Ayala Malls Manila Bay

==== Finals ====
November 7
2:35 pm

Report

MCFASolver Tech Centrale	21–20	Meralco Bolts 3x3

Ayala Malls Manila Bay

=== Final standings ===
Pos	Team	Pld	W	L	PCT	AVG	PF	Tour points
1	MCFASolver Tech Centrale	6	5	1	.833	17.5	105	100
2	Meralco Bolts 3x3	6	3	3	.500	17.2	103	80
3	Pioneer ElastoSeal Katibays	6	5	1	.833	17.7	106	70
4	TNT Triple Giga	5	3	2	.600	18.6	93	60
Eliminated at the quarterfinals
5	San Miguel Beermen	4	3	1	.750	20.3	81	50
6	Cavitex Braves	4	2	2	.500	17.3	69	45
7	Blackwater Smooth Razor	3	1	2	.333	17.7	53	40
8	Purefoods TJ Titans	4	1	3	.250	19.5	78	35
Eliminated at the preliminary round
9	Barangay Ginebra San Miguel	3	0	3	.000	15.0	45	20
10	NorthPort Batang Pier	3	0	3	.000	14.7	44	18
11	Terrafirma 3x3	2	0	2	.000	14.0	28	16

Source: PBA 3x3

== 5th leg ==
=== Groupings ===
Pool A	Pool B	Pool C
MCFASolver Tech Centrale (1); Cavitex Braves (6); Blackwater Smooth Razor (7)	Meralco Bolts 3x3 (2); San Miguel Beermen (5); Purefoods TJ Titans (8); Terrafirma 3x3 (11)	Pioneer ElastoSeal Katibays (3); TNT Tropang Giga (4); Barangay Ginebra San Miguel (9); NorthPort Batang Pier (10)

=== Preliminary round ===
==== Pool A ====
Pos	Team	Pld	W	L	PF	PA	PD	PCT	Qualification
1	MCFASolver Tech Centrale	2	2	0	38	32	+6	1.000	Quarterfinals
2	Cavitex Braves	2	1	1	36	27	+9	.500	Quarterfinals
3	Blackwater Smooth Razor	2	0	2	29	44	−15	.000	

Source: PBA 3x3
Rules for classification: 1) Wins; Win ratio if unequal number of games; 2) Head-to-head record; 3) Average points per game; 4) Higher seed.

November 13
11:20 am

Report

MCFASolver Tech Centrale	22–18	Blackwater Smooth Razor

Fairview Terraces

November 13
12:35 pm

Report

Cavitex Braves	22–11	Blackwater Smooth Razor

Fairview Terraces

November 13
1:50 pm

Report

MCFASolver Tech Centrale	16–14	Cavitex Braves

Fairview Terraces

==== Pool B ====
Pos	Team	Pld	W	L	PF	PA	PD	PCT	Qualification
1	Meralco Bolts 3x3	3	3	0	61	44	+17	1.000	Quarterfinals
2	Terrafirma 3x3	3	2	1	55	58	−3	.667	Quarterfinals
3	Purefoods TJ Titans	3	1	2	57	58	−1	.333	Quarterfinals
4	San Miguel Beermen	3	0	3	50	63	−13	.000	

Source: PBA 3x3
Rules for classification: 1) Wins; Win ratio if unequal number of games; 2) Head-to-head record; 3) Average points per game; 4) Higher seed.

November 13
10:30 am

Report

Meralco Bolts 3x3	22–14	San Miguel Beermen

Fairview Terraces

November 13
11:45 am

Report

Terrafirma 3x3	13–21	Meralco Bolts 3x3

Fairview Terraces

November 13
1:00 pm

Report

Terrafirma 3x3	21–20	Purefoods TJ Titans

Fairview Terraces

November 13
2:15 pm

Report

Purefoods TJ Titans	17–18	Meralco Bolts 3x3

Fairview Terraces

November 13
3:05 pm

Report

San Miguel Beermen	17–21	Terrafirma 3x3

Fairview Terraces

November 14
10:30 am

Report

San Miguel Beermen	19–20	Purefoods TJ Titans

Fairview Terraces

==== Pool C ====
Pos	Team	Pld	W	L	PF	PA	PD	PCT	Qualification
1	NorthPort Batang Pier	3	2	1	59	52	+7	.667 (Note: NorthPort Batang Pier 1–0 TNT Triple Giga)	Quarterfinals
2	TNT Triple Giga	3	2	1	55	51	+4	.667	Quarterfinals
3	Pioneer ElastoSeal Katibays	3	1	2	50	56	−6	.333 (Note: Pioneer ElastoSeal Katibays 1–0 Barangay Ginebra San Miguel)	Quarterfinals
4	Barangay Ginebra San Miguel	3	1	2	49	54	−5	.333	

Source: PBA 3x3
Rules for classification: 1) Wins; Win ratio if unequal number of games; 2) Head-to-head record; 3) Average points per game; 4) Higher seed.
Notes:

November 13
10:55 am

Report

Barangay Ginebra San Miguel	14–16	Pioneer ElastoSeal Katibays

Fairview Terraces

November 13
12:10 pm

Report

TNT Triple Giga	21–13	Barangay Ginebra San Miguel

Fairview Terraces

November 13
1:25 pm

Report

Pioneer ElastoSeal Katibays	17–21	NorthPort Batang Pier

Fairview Terraces

November 13
2:40 pm

Report

NorthPort Batang Pier	17–22	Barangay Ginebra San Miguel

Fairview Terraces

November 13
3:30 pm

Report

Pioneer ElastoSeal Katibays	17–21	TNT Triple Giga

Fairview Terraces

November 14
10:55 am

Report

TNT Triple Giga	13–21	NorthPort Batang Pier

Fairview Terraces

=== Knockout stage ===
TNT Triple Giga defeated Pioneer ElastoSeal Katibays in the finals, 21–13, to become the fifth leg winners.

==== Bracket ====
Quarterfinals
A1	MCFASolver Tech Centrale	19
B3	Purefoods TJ Titans	17
C2	TNT Triple Giga	18
B2	Terrafirma 3x3	12
B1	Meralco Bolts 3x3	21
C3	Pioneer ElastoSeal Katibays	22
C1	NorthPort Batang Pier	15
A2	Cavitex Braves	13

Semifinals
A1	MCFASolver Tech Centrale	18
C2	TNT Triple Giga	21
C3	Pioneer ElastoSeal Katibays	18
C1	NorthPort Batang Pier	16

Finals
C2	TNT Triple Giga	21
C3	Pioneer ElastoSeal Katibays	13
Third place
A1	MCFASolver Tech Centrale	21
C1	NorthPort Batang Pier	15

==== Quarterfinals ====
November 14
11:20 am

Report

MCFASolver Tech Centrale	19–17	Purefoods TJ Titans

Fairview Terraces

November 14
11:45 am

Report

TNT Triple Giga	18–12	Terrafirma 3x3

Fairview Terraces

November 14
12:10 pm

Report

Meralco Bolts 3x3	21–22	Pioneer ElastoSeal Katibays

Fairview Terraces

November 14
12:35 pm

Report

NorthPort Batang Pier	15–13	Cavitex Braves

Fairview Terraces

==== Semifinals ====
November 14
1:00 pm

Report

MCFASolver Tech Centrale	18–21	TNT Triple Giga

Fairview Terraces

November 14
1:25 pm

Report

Pioneer ElastoSeal Katibays	18–16	NorthPort Batang Pier

Fairview Terraces

==== Third place game ====
November 14
2:10 pm

Report

MCFASolver Tech Centrale	21–15	NorthPort Batang Pier

Fairview Terraces

==== Finals ====
November 14
2:35 pm

Report

TNT Triple Giga	21–13	Pioneer ElastoSeal Katibays

Fairview Terraces

=== Final standings ===
Pos	Team	Pld	W	L	PCT	AVG	PF	Tour points
1	TNT Triple Giga	6	5	1	.833	19.2	115	100
2	Pioneer ElastoSeal Katibays	6	3	3	.500	17.2	103	80
3	MCFASolver Tech Centrale	5	4	1	.800	19.2	96	70
4	NorthPort Batang Pier	6	3	3	.500	17.5	105	60
Eliminated at the quarterfinals
5	Meralco Bolts 3x3	4	3	1	.750	20.5	82	50
6	Terrafirma 3x3	4	2	2	.500	16.8	67	45
7	Cavitex Braves	3	1	2	.333	16.3	49	40
8	Purefoods TJ Titans	4	1	3	.250	18.5	74	35
Eliminated at the preliminary round
9	Barangay Ginebra San Miguel	3	1	2	.333	16.3	49	20
10	San Miguel Beermen	3	0	3	.000	16.7	50	18
11	Blackwater Smooth Razor	2	0	2	.000	14.5	29	16

Source: PBA 3x3

== 6th leg ==
=== Groupings ===
Pool A	Pool B	Pool C
TNT Tropang Giga (1); Terrafirma 3x3 (6); Cavitex Braves (7)	Pioneer ElastoSeal Katibays (2); Meralco Bolts 3x3 (5); Purefoods TJ Titans (8); Blackwater Smooth Razor (11)	MCFASolver Tech Centrale (3); NorthPort Batang Pier (4); Barangay Ginebra San Miguel (9); San Miguel Beermen (10)

=== Preliminary round ===
==== Pool A ====
Pos	Team	Pld	W	L	PF	PA	PD	PCT	Qualification
1	TNT Triple Giga	2	2	0	40	36	+4	1.000	Quarterfinals
2	Cavitex Braves	2	1	1	37	33	+4	.500	Quarterfinals
3	Terrafirma 3x3	2	0	2	34	42	−8	.000	

Source: PBA 3x3
Rules for classification: 1) Wins; Win ratio if unequal number of games; 2) Head-to-head record; 3) Average points per game; 4) Higher seed.

November 20
11:20 am

Report

TNT Triple Giga	19–16	Cavitex Braves

Glorietta

November 20
12:35 pm

Report

Terrafirma 3x3	14–21	Cavitex Braves

Glorietta

November 20
1:50 pm

Report

TNT Triple Giga	21–20	Terrafirma 3x3

Glorietta

==== Pool B ====
Pos	Team	Pld	W	L	PF	PA	PD	PCT	Qualification
1	Pioneer ElastoSeal Katibays	3	2	1	49	45	+4	.667 (Note: Pioneer ElastoSeal Katibays 1–0 Meralco Bolts 3x3)	Quarterfinals
2	Meralco Bolts 3x3	3	2	1	59	47	+12	.667	Quarterfinals
3	Blackwater Smooth Razor	3	1	2	52	60	−8	.333 (Note: Blackwater Smooth Razor 1–0 Purefoods TJ Titans)	Quarterfinals
4	Purefoods TJ Titans	3	1	2	42	50	−8	.333	

Source: PBA 3x3
Rules for classification: 1) Wins; Win ratio if unequal number of games; 2) Head-to-head record; 3) Average points per game; 4) Higher seed.
Notes:

November 20
10:30 am

Report

Pioneer ElastoSeal Katibays	18–17	Meralco Bolts 3x3

Glorietta

November 20
11:45 am

Report

Blackwater Smooth Razor	16–21	Pioneer ElastoSeal Katibays

Glorietta

November 20
1:00 pm

Report

Blackwater Smooth Razor	19–18	Purefoods TJ Titans

Glorietta

November 20
2:15 pm

Report

Purefoods TJ Titans	12–10	Pioneer ElastoSeal Katibays

Glorietta

November 20
3:05 pm

Report

Meralco Bolts 3x3	21–17	Blackwater Smooth Razor

Glorietta

November 21
10:30 am

Report

Meralco Bolts 3x3	21–12	Purefoods TJ Titans

Glorietta

==== Pool C ====
Pos	Team	Pld	W	L	PF	PA	PD	PCT	Qualification
1	MCFASolver Tech Centrale	3	3	0	59	51	+8	1.000	Quarterfinals
2	Barangay Ginebra San Miguel	3	2	1	55	55	0	.667	Quarterfinals
3	San Miguel Beermen	3	1	2	58	53	+5	.333	Quarterfinals
4	NorthPort Batang Pier	3	0	3	51	63	−12	.000	

Source: PBA 3x3
Rules for classification: 1) Wins; Win ratio if unequal number of games; 2) Head-to-head record; 3) Average points per game; 4) Higher seed.

November 20
10:55 am

Report

Barangay Ginebra San Miguel	13–18	MCFASolver Tech Centrale

Glorietta

November 20
12:10 pm

Report

NorthPort Batang Pier	18–21	Barangay Ginebra San Miguel

Glorietta

November 20
1:25 pm

Report

MCFASolver Tech Centrale	20–18	San Miguel Beermen

Glorietta

November 20
2:40 pm

Report

San Miguel Beermen	19–21	Barangay Ginebra San Miguel

Glorietta

November 20
3:30 pm

Report

MCFASolver Tech Centrale	21–20	NorthPort Batang Pier

Glorietta

November 21
10:55 am

Report

NorthPort Batang Pier	13–21	San Miguel Beermen

Glorietta

=== Knockout stage ===
TNT Triple Giga defeated Cavitex Braves in the finals, 21–14, to become the sixth leg winners.

==== Bracket ====
Quarterfinals
A1	TNT Triple Giga	18
B3	Blackwater Smooth Razor	16
C2	Barangay Ginebra San Miguel	19
B2	Meralco Bolts 3x3	20
B1	Pioneer ElastoSeal Katibays	21
C3	San Miguel Beermen	20
C1	MCFASolver Tech Centrale	19
A2	Cavitex Braves	21

Semifinals
A1	TNT Triple Giga	21
B2	Meralco Bolts 3x3	19
B1	Pioneer ElastoSeal Katibays	16
A2	Cavitex Braves	18

Finals
A1	TNT Triple Giga	21
A2	Cavitex Braves	14
Third place
B2	Meralco Bolts 3x3	21
B1	Pioneer ElastoSeal Katibays	13

==== Quarterfinals ====
November 21
11:20 am

Report

TNT Triple Giga	18–16	Blackwater Smooth Razor

Glorietta

November 21
11:45 am

Report

Barangay Ginebra San Miguel	19–20	Meralco Bolts 3x3

Glorietta

November 21
12:10 pm

Report

Pioneer ElastoSeal Katibays	21–20	San Miguel Beermen

Glorietta

November 21
12:35 pm

Report

MCFASolver Tech Centrale	19–21	Cavitex Braves

Glorietta

==== Semifinals ====
November 21
1:00 pm

Report

TNT Triple Giga	21–19	Meralco Bolts 3x3

Glorietta

November 21
1:25 pm

Report

Pioneer ElastoSeal Katibays	16–182	Cavitex Braves

Glorietta

==== Third place game ====
November 21
2:10 pm

Report

Meralco Bolts 3x3	21–13	Pioneer ElastoSeal Katibays

Glorietta

==== Finals ====
November 21
2:35 pm

Report

TNT Triple Giga	21–14	Cavitex Braves

Glorietta

=== Final standings ===
Pos	Team	Pld	W	L	PCT	AVG	PF	Tour points
1	TNT Triple Giga	5	5	0	1.000	20.0	100	100
2	Cavitex Braves	5	3	2	.600	18.0	90	80
3	Meralco Bolts 3x3	6	4	2	.667	19.8	119	70
4	Pioneer ElastoSeal Katibays	6	3	3	.500	16.5	99	60
Eliminated at the quarterfinals
5	MCFASolver Tech Centrale	4	3	1	.750	19.5	78	50
6	Barangay Ginebra San Miguel	4	2	2	.333	18.5	74	45
7	San Miguel Beermen	4	1	3	.250	19.5	78	40
8	Blackwater Smooth Razor	4	1	3	.250	17.0	68	35
Eliminated at the preliminary round
9	Purefoods TJ Titans	3	1	2	.333	14.0	42	20
10	NorthPort Batang Pier	3	0	3	.000	17.0	51	18
11	Terrafirma 3x3	2	0	2	.000	17.0	34	16

Source: PBA 3x3

== Legs summary ==
Pos	Team	1st leg	2nd leg	3rd leg	4th leg	5th leg	6th leg	Pts	Qualification
1	TNT Triple Giga	1st	1st	1st	4th	1st	1st	560	Qualification to Grand Finals quarterfinal round
2	Meralco Bolts 3x3	3rd	5th	3rd	2nd	5th	3rd	390	Qualification to Grand Finals quarterfinal round
3	Cavitex Braves	2nd	7th	2nd	6th	7th	2nd	365	Qualification to Grand Finals quarterfinal round
4	Pioneer ElastoSeal Katibays	11th	3rd	4th	3rd	2nd	4th	356	Qualification to Grand Finals quarterfinal round
5	MCFASolver Tech Centrale	4th	6th	9th	1st	3rd	5th	345	Qualification to Grand Finals preliminary round
6	Blackwater Smooth Razor	7th	4th	7th	7th	11th	8th	231	Qualification to Grand Finals preliminary round
7	Terrafirma 3x3	10th	2nd	6th	11th	6th	11th	220	Qualification to Grand Finals preliminary round
8	Purefoods TJ Titans	6th	10th	5th	8th	8th	9th	203	Qualification to Grand Finals preliminary round
9	San Miguel Beermen	8th	8th	11th	5th	10th	7th	194	Qualification to Grand Finals preliminary round
10	Barangay Ginebra San Miguel	5th	9th	10th	9th	9th	6th	173	Qualification to Grand Finals preliminary round
11	NorthPort Batang Pier	9th	11th	8th	10th	4th	10th	167	

Source: PBA 3x3 Report

== Grand Finals ==
=== Preliminary round ===
==== Pool A ====
Pos	Team	Pld	W	L	PF	PA	PD	PCT	Qualification
1	San Miguel Beermen	2	1	1	37	34	+3	.500	Quarterfinals
2	Purefoods TJ Titans	2	1	1	34	38	−4	.500	Quarterfinals
3	MCFASolver Tech Centrale	2	1	1	32	31	+1	.500	

Source: PBA 3x3
Rules for classification: 1) Wins; Win ratio if unequal number of games; 2) Head-to-head record; 3) Average points per game; 4) Higher seed.

November 27
2:00 pm

Report

MCFASolver Tech Centrale	13–18	San Miguel Beermen

Glorietta

November 27
2:50 pm

Report

Purefoods TJ Titans	21–19	San Miguel Beermen

Glorietta

November 27
3:40 pm

Report

MCFASolver Tech Centrale	19–13	Purefoods TJ Titans

Glorietta

==== Pool B ====
Pos	Team	Pld	W	L	PF	PA	PD	PCT	Qualification
1	Blackwater Smooth Razor	2	2	0	36	31	+5	1.000	Quarterfinals
2	Barangay Ginebra San Miguel	2	1	1	35	33	+2	.500	Quarterfinals
3	Terrafirma 3x3	2	0	2	35	42	−7	.000	

Source: PBA 3x3
Rules for classification: 1) Wins; Win ratio if unequal number of games; 2) Head-to-head record; 3) Average points per game; 4) Higher seed.

November 27
2:25 pm

Report

Blackwater Smooth Razor	15–14	Barangay Ginebra San Miguel

Glorietta

November 27
3:15 pm

Report

Terrafirma 3x3	18–21	Barangay Ginebra San Miguel

Glorietta

November 27
4:05 pm

Report

Blackwater Smooth Razor	21–17	Terrafirma 3x3

Glorietta

=== Knockout stage ===
==== Bracket ====
Seed refers to the position of the team after six legs. Letter and number inside parentheses denotes the pool letter and pool position of the team, respectively, after the preliminary round of the Grand Finals.

Quarterfinals
1	TNT Triple Giga	19
10 (B2)	Barangay Ginebra San Miguel	17
9 (A1)	San Miguel Beermen	16
4	Pioneer ElastoSeal Katibays	21
3	Cavitex Braves	22
6 (B1)	Blackwater Smooth Razor	11
8 (A2)	Purefoods TJ Titans	10
2	Meralco Bolts 3x3	21

Semifinals
1	TNT Triple Giga	21
4	Pioneer ElastoSeal Katibays	13
3	Cavitex Braves	16
2	Meralco Bolts 3x3	22

Finals
1	TNT Triple Giga	21
2	Meralco Bolts 3x3	20
Third place
4	Pioneer ElastoSeal Katibays	16
3	Cavitex Braves	15

==== Quarterfinals ====
November 27
4:30 pm

Report

San Miguel Beermen	16–21	Pioneer ElastoSeal Katibays

Glorietta

November 27
4:55 pm

Report

TNT Triple Giga	19–17	Barangay Ginebra San Miguel

Glorietta

November 27
5:20 pm

Report

Purefoods TJ Titans	10–21	Meralco Bolts 3x3

Glorietta

November 27
5:45 pm

Report

Cavitex Braves	22–11	Blackwater Smooth Razor

Glorietta

==== Semifinals ====
November 27
6:10 pm

Report

TNT Triple Giga	21–13	Pioneer ElastoSeal Katibays

Glorietta

November 27
6:35 pm

Report

Cavitex Braves	16–22	Meralco Bolts 3x3

Glorietta

==== Third place game ====
November 27
7:20 pm

Report

Pioneer ElastoSeal Katibays	16–15	Cavitex Braves

Glorietta

==== Finals ====
November 27
7:45 pm

Report

TNT Triple Giga	21–20	Meralco Bolts 3x3

Glorietta
