= 2021 PBA 3x3 season – Second conference =

Second conference of the 2021 PBA 3x3 season

The second conference of the 2021 PBA 3x3 season started on February 19, 2022, and ended on April 27, 2022. It consisted of six two-day legs and a grand final. Pioneer Pro Tibay became the conference's Grand Champion after defeating Sista Super Sealers in the Grand Finals, 12–10.

== Teams ==
The players listed have played in at least one of the legs.

Team	Players					
Barangay Ginebra San Miguel	Jollo Go	Dennice Villamor	Jayson David	Encho Serrano	Mikey Cabahug	Mark Dyke
Cavitex Braves	Ernest Reyes	Dominick Farjardo	Prince Rivero	Kyles Lao	Larry Fonacier	AC Soberano
Limitless Appmasters	Brandon Ganuelas-Rosser	Jorey Napoles	Reymar Caduyac	Marvin Hayes		
Master Sardines Fishing Champs	Cyrus Tabi	Ramon Alfredo Mabayo	Michole Sorela	Levi Hernandez	Jefferson Comia	John Mahari
Meralco Bolts 3x3	Tonino Gonzaga	Alfred Batino	Dexter Maiquez	Joseph Sedurifa	Maclean Sabellina	
NorthPort Batang Pier	Michael Calisaan	LA Revilla	Mark Olayon	Joshua Webb	Jeepy Faundo	Louie Brill
Pioneer Pro Tibay	Gian Abrigo	Robin Roño	Carlo Escalambre	Dan Reducto	Carlo de Chavez	Christian Rivera
Platinum Karaoke	Ryan Monteclaro	Matt Salem	JR Alabanza	Yutien Andrada	Chris de Chavez	Raphael Banal
Purefoods TJ Titans	Paolo Javelona	Jun Bonsubre	Val Acuña	Joseph Eriobu	Jaymo Eguilos	Jed Mendoza
San Miguel Beermen	Louie Vigil	James Mangahas	Jeff Manday	Ken Bono	Bacon Austria	Moncrief Rogado
Sista Super Sealers	Kenneth Mocon	Leo de Vera	Joseph Manlangit	Jan Jamon	Wilson Baltazar	Jamil Gabawan
Terrafirma 3x3	Dhon Reverente	Jebb Bulawan	Terrence Tumalip	Jeremiah Taladua	Ronald Tubid	
TNT Tropang Giga	Almond Vosotros	Lervin Flores	Samboy de Leon	Rey Mark Acuno	Chris Javier	Martin Gozum

== 1st leg ==
=== Groupings ===
The preliminary drawing of lots was held on February 14, 2022.

Pool A	Pool B	Pool C
Barangay Ginebra San Miguel; Master Sardines Fishing Champs; Platinum Karaoke; Sista Super Sealers; Terrafirma 3x3	Meralco Bolts 3x3 Pioneer Pro Tibay; San Miguel Beermen; TNT Tropang Giga	Cavitex Braves; Limitless Appmasters; NorthPort Batang Pier; Purefoods TJ Titans

=== Preliminary round ===
==== Pool A ====
Pos	Team	Pld	W	L	PF	PA	PD	PCT	Qualification
1	Barangay Ginebra San Miguel	4	4	0	78	68	+10	1.000	Quarterfinals
2	Platinum Karaoke	4	3	1	73	60	+13	.750	Quarterfinals
3	Sista Super Sealers	4	2	2	73	77	−4	.500	Quarterfinals
4	Terrafirma 3x3	4	1	3	62	73	−11	.250	
5	Master Sardines Fishing Champs	4	0	4	73	81	−8	.000	

Source: PBA 3x3
Rules for classification: 1) Wins; Win ratio if unequal number of games; 2) Head-to-head record; 3) Average points per game; 4) Higher seed.

February 19, 2022
8:00 am

Report

Platinum Karaoke	14–15	Barangay Ginebra San Miguel

Smart Araneta Coliseum

February 19, 2022
8:25 am

Report

Sista Super Sealers	20–19	Master Sardines Fishing Champs

Smart Araneta Coliseum

February 19, 2022
9:40 am

Report

Terrafirma 3x3	12–17	Platinum Karaoke

Smart Araneta Coliseum

February 19, 2022
10:05 am

Report

Barangay Ginebra San Miguel	21–19	Master Sardines Fishing Champs

Smart Araneta Coliseum

February 19, 2022
11:45 am

Report

Sista Super Sealers	20–21	Barangay Ginebra San Miguel

Smart Araneta Coliseum

February 19, 2022
12:35 pm

Report

Master Sardines Fishing Champs	17–19	Terrafirma 3x3

Smart Araneta Coliseum

February 19, 2022
1:25 pm

Report

Platinum Karaoke	21–15	Sista Super Sealers

Smart Araneta Coliseum

February 19, 2022
2:15 pm

Report

Barangay Ginebra San Miguel	21–15	Terrafirma 3x3

Smart Araneta Coliseum

February 20, 2022
8:50 am

Report

Terrafirma 3x3	16–18	Sista Super Sealers

Smart Araneta Coliseum

February 20, 2022
10:05 am

Report

Master Sardines Fishing Champs	18–21	Platinum Karaoke

Smart Araneta Coliseum

==== Pool B ====
Pos	Team	Pld	W	L	PF	PA	PD	PCT	Qualification
1	TNT Tropang Giga	3	3	0	58	45	+13	1.000	Quarterfinals
2	Meralco Bolts 3x3	3	2	1	54	50	+4	.667	Quarterfinals
3	San Miguel Beermen	3	1	2	59	57	+2	.333	Knockout game
4	Pioneer Pro Tibay	3	0	3	43	62	−19	.000	

Source: PBA 3x3
Rules for classification: 1) Wins; Win ratio if unequal number of games; 2) Head-to-head record; 3) Average points per game; 4) Higher seed.

February 19, 2022
8:50 am

Report

TNT Tropang Giga	20–19	San Miguel Beermen

Smart Araneta Coliseum

February 19, 2022
10:30 am

Report

Meralco Bolts 3x3	12–18	TNT Tropang Giga

Smart Araneta Coliseum

February 19, 2022
11:20 am

Report

Pioneer Pro Tibay	16–21	San Miguel Beermen

Smart Araneta Coliseum

February 19, 2022
1:00 pm

Report

Meralco Bolts 3x3	21–13	Pioneer Pro Tibay

Smart Araneta Coliseum

February 20, 2022
8:25 am

Report

San Miguel Beermen	19–21	Meralco Bolts 3x3

Smart Araneta Coliseum

February 20, 2022
9:40 am

Report

Pioneer Pro Tibay	14–20	TNT Tropang Giga

Smart Araneta Coliseum

==== Pool C ====
Pos	Team	Pld	W	L	PF	PA	PD	PCT	Qualification
1	Limitless Appmasters	3	3	0	63	37	+26	1.000	Quarterfinals
2	Purefoods TJ Titans	3	1	2	50	52	−2	.333 (Note: Purefoods TJ Titans 16.7 avg. points; Cavitex Braves 15.0 avg. points; NorthPort Batang Pier 15.0 avg. points. Cavitex Braves 1–0 NorthPort Batang Pier)	Quarterfinals
3	Cavitex Braves	3	1	2	45	59	−14	.333	Knockout game
4	NorthPort Batang Pier	3	1	2	45	55	−10	.333	

Source: PBA 3x3
Rules for classification: 1) Wins; Win ratio if unequal number of games; 2) Head-to-head record; 3) Average points per game; 4) Higher seed.
Notes:

February 19, 2022
9:15 am

Report

NorthPort Batang Pier	20–16	Purefoods TJ Titans

Smart Araneta Coliseum

February 19, 2022
10:55 am

Report

Cavitex Braves	11–21	Purefoods TJ Titans

Smart Araneta Coliseum

February 19, 2022
12:10 pm

Report

Limitless Appmasters	21–8	NorthPort Batang Pier

Smart Araneta Coliseum

February 19, 2022
1:50 pm

Report

Cavitex Braves	16–21	Limitless Appmasters

Smart Araneta Coliseum

February 20, 2022
8:00 am

Report

NorthPort Batang Pier	17–18	Cavitex Braves

Smart Araneta Coliseum

February 20, 2022
9:40 am

Report

Purefoods TJ Titans	13–21	Limitless Appmasters

Smart Araneta Coliseum

=== Knockout stage ===
TNT Tropang Giga defeated Meralco Bolts 3x3 in the finals, 21–19, to become the first leg winners.

==== Bracket ====
Knockout game
B3	San Miguel Beermen	22
C3	Cavitex Braves	13

Quarterfinals
A1	Barangay Ginebra San Miguel	21
B3	San Miguel Beermen	14
B2	Meralco Bolts 3x3	21
A3	Sista Super Sealers	16
B1	TNT Tropang Giga	21
C2	Purefoods TJ Titans	15
C1	Limitless Appmasters	21
A2	Platinum Karaoke	11

Semifinals
A1	Barangay Ginebra San Miguel	20
B2	Meralco Bolts 3x3	21
B1	TNT Tropang Giga	20
C1	Limitless Appmasters	19

Finals
B2	Meralco Bolts 3x3	19
B1	TNT Tropang Giga	21
Third place
A1	Barangay Ginebra San Miguel	21
C1	Limitless Appmasters	17

==== Knockout game ====
February 20, 2022
10:30 am

Report

San Miguel Beermen	22–13	Cavitex Braves

Smart Araneta Coliseum

==== Quarterfinals ====
February 20, 2022
10:55 am

Report

Meralco Bolts 3x3	21–16	Sista Super Sealers

Smart Araneta Coliseum

February 20, 2022
11:20 am

Report

TNT Tropang Giga	21–15	Purefoods TJ Titans

Smart Araneta Coliseum

February 20, 2022
11:45 am

Report

Barangay Ginebra San Miguel	21–14	San Miguel Beermen

Smart Araneta Coliseum

February 20, 2022
12:10 pm

Report

Limitless Appmasters	21–11	Platinum Karaoke

Smart Araneta Coliseum

==== Semifinals ====
February 20, 2022
12:35 pm

Report

Barangay Ginebra San Miguel	20–21	Meralco Bolts 3x3

Smart Araneta Coliseum

February 20, 2022
1:00 pm

Report

TNT Tropang Giga	20–19	Limitless Appmasters

Smart Araneta Coliseum

==== Third place game ====
February 20, 2022
1:40 pm

Report

Barangay Ginebra San Miguel	21–17	Limitless Appmasters

Smart Araneta Coliseum

==== Finals ====
February 20, 2022
2:05 pm

Report

Meralco Bolts 3x3	19–21	TNT Tropang Giga

Smart Araneta Coliseum

=== Final standings ===
Pos	Team	Pld	W	L	PCT	AVG	PF	Tour points
1	TNT Tropang Giga	6	6	0	1.000	20.0	120	100
2	Meralco Bolts 3x3	6	4	2	.667	19.2	115	80
3	Barangay Ginebra San Miguel	7	6	1	.857	20.0	140	70
4	Limitless Appmasters	6	4	2	.667	20.0	120	60
Eliminated at the quarterfinals
5	Platinum Karaoke	5	3	2	.600	16.8	84	50
6	San Miguel Beermen	5	2	3	.400	19.0	95	45
7	Sista Super Sealers	5	2	3	.400	17.8	89	40
8	Purefoods TJ Titans	4	1	3	.250	16.3	65	35
Eliminated at the knockout game
9	Cavitex Braves	4	1	3	.250	14.5	58	20
Eliminated at the preliminary round
10	NorthPort Batang Pier	3	1	2	.333	15.0	45	18
11	Terrafirma 3x3	4	1	3	.250	15.5	62	16
12	Master Sardines Fishing Champs	4	0	4	.000	18.3	73	14
13	Pioneer Pro Tibay	3	0	3	.000	14.3	43	12

Source: PBA 3x3

== 2nd leg ==
=== Groupings ===
Pool A	Pool B	Pool C
TNT Tropang Giga (1); San Miguel Beermen (6); Sista Super Sealers (7); Master Sardines Fishing Champs (12); Pioneer Pro Tibay (13)	Meralco Bolts 3x3 (2); Platinum Karaoke (5); Purefoods TJ Titans (8); Terrafirma 3x3 (11)	Barangay Ginebra San Miguel (3); Limitless Appmasters (4); Cavitex Braves (9); NorthPort Batang Pier (10)

=== Preliminary round ===
==== Pool A ====
Pos	Team	Pld	W	L	PF	PA	PD	PCT	Qualification
1	Pioneer Pro Tibay	4	4	0	82	59	+23	1.000	Quarterfinals
2	TNT Tropang Giga	4	3	1	70	71	−1	.750	Quarterfinals
3	San Miguel Beermen	4	2	2	79	71	+8	.500	Quarterfinals
4	Sista Super Sealers	4	1	3	64	76	−12	.250	
5	Master Sardines Fishing Champs	4	0	4	60	78	−18	.000	

Source: PBA 3x3
Rules for classification: 1) Wins; Win ratio if unequal number of games; 2) Head-to-head record; 3) Average points per game; 4) Higher seed.

March 5, 2022
8:00 am

Report

Pioneer Pro Tibay	19–14	Sista Super Sealers

Smart Araneta Coliseum

March 5, 2022
8:25 am

Report

TNT Tropang Giga	21–20	San Miguel Beermen

Smart Araneta Coliseum

March 5, 2022
9:40 am

Report

Master Sardines Fishing Champs	15–21	Pioneer Pro Tibay

Smart Araneta Coliseum

March 5, 2022
10:05 am

Report

Sista Super Sealers	17–21	TNT Tropang Giga

Smart Araneta Coliseum

March 5, 2022
11:20 am

Report

Master Sardines Fishing Champs	17–21	San Miguel Beermen

Smart Araneta Coliseum

March 5, 2022
11:45 am

Report

Pioneer Pro Tibay	21–13	TNT Tropang Giga

Smart Araneta Coliseum

March 5, 2022
1:00 pm

Report

Sista Super Sealers	21–15	Master Sardines Fishing Champs

Smart Araneta Coliseum

March 5, 2022
1:25 pm

Report

San Miguel Beermen	17–21	Pioneer Pro Tibay

Smart Araneta Coliseum

March 6, 2022
8:50 am

Report

San Miguel Beermen	21–12	Sista Super Sealers

Smart Araneta Coliseum

March 6, 2022
10:05 am

Report

TNT Tropang Giga	15–13	Master Sardines Fishing Champs

Smart Araneta Coliseum

==== Pool B ====
Pos	Team	Pld	W	L	PF	PA	PD	PCT	Qualification
1	Meralco Bolts 3x3	3	3	0	59	42	+17	1.000	Quarterfinals
2	Platinum Karaoke	3	2	1	58	55	+3	.667	Quarterfinals
3	Purefoods TJ Titans	3	1	2	51	59	−8	.333	Knockout game
4	Terrafirma 3x3	3	0	3	46	58	−12	.000	

Source: PBA 3x3
Rules for classification: 1) Wins; Win ratio if unequal number of games; 2) Head-to-head record; 3) Average points per game; 4) Higher seed.

March 5, 2022
8:50 am

Report

Meralco Bolts 3x3	18–10	Terrafirma 3x3

Smart Araneta Coliseum

March 5, 2022
10:30 am

Report

Platinum Karaoke	21–16	Purefoods TJ Titans

Smart Araneta Coliseum

March 5, 2022
12:10 pm

Report

Meralco Bolts 3x3	21–16	Platinum Karaoke

Smart Araneta Coliseum

March 5, 2022
1:50 pm

Report

Terrafirma 3x3	18–19	Purefoods TJ Titans

Smart Araneta Coliseum

March 6, 2022
8:25 am

Report

Purefoods TJ Titans	16–20	Meralco Bolts 3x3

Smart Araneta Coliseum

March 6, 2022
9:40 am

Report

Platinum Karaoke	21–18	Terrafirma 3x3

Smart Araneta Coliseum

==== Pool C ====
Pos	Team	Pld	W	L	PF	PA	PD	PCT	Qualification
1	Limitless Appmasters	3	3	0	62	46	+16	1.000	Quarterfinals
2	Barangay Ginebra San Miguel	3	2	1	56	55	+1	.667	Quarterfinals
3	NorthPort Batang Pier	3	1	2	51	53	−2	.333	Knockout game
4	Cavitex Braves	3	0	3	48	63	−15	.000	

Source: PBA 3x3
Rules for classification: 1) Wins; Win ratio if unequal number of games; 2) Head-to-head record; 3) Average points per game; 4) Higher seed.

March 5, 2022
9:15 am

Report

Barangay Ginebra San Miguel	17–20	Limitless Appmasters

Smart Araneta Coliseum

March 5, 2022
10:55 am

Report

NorthPort Batang Pier	21–14	Cavitex Braves

Smart Araneta Coliseum

March 5, 2022
12:35 pm

Report

Barangay Ginebra San Miguel	18–16	NorthPort Batang Pier

Smart Araneta Coliseum

March 5, 2022
2:15 pm

Report

Limitless Appmasters	21–15	Cavitex Braves

Smart Araneta Coliseum

March 6, 2022
8:00 am

Report

Cavitex Braves	19–21	Barangay Ginebra San Miguel

Smart Araneta Coliseum

March 6, 2022
9:15 am

Report

Limitless Appmasters	21–14	NorthPort Batang Pier

Smart Araneta Coliseum

=== Knockout stage ===
San Miguel Beermen defeated Barangay Ginebra San Miguel in the finals, 21–15, to become the second leg winners.

==== Bracket ====
Knockout game
B3	Purefoods TJ Titans	21
C3	NorthPort Batang Pier	18

Quarterfinals
A1	Pioneer Pro Tibay	19
B3	Purefoods TJ Titans	14
B2	Platinum Karaoke	17
A3	San Miguel Beermen	21
B1	Meralco Bolts 3x3	15
C2	Barangay Ginebra San Miguel	22
C1	Limitless Appmasters	21
A2	TNT Tropang Giga	20

Semifinals
A1	Pioneer Pro Tibay	19
A3	San Miguel Beermen	21
C2	Barangay Ginebra San Miguel	21
C1	Limitless Appmasters	18

Finals
A3	San Miguel Beermen	21
C2	Barangay Ginebra San Miguel	15
Third place
A1	Pioneer Pro Tibay	13
C1	Limitless Appmasters	21

==== Knockout game ====
March 6, 2022
10:30 am

Report

Purefoods TJ Titans	21–18	NorthPort Batang Pier

Smart Araneta Coliseum

==== Quarterfinals ====
March 6, 2022
10:55 am

Report

Platinum Karaoke	17–21	San Miguel Beermen

Smart Araneta Coliseum

March 6, 2022
11:20 am

Report

Meralco Bolts 3x3	15–22	Barangay Ginebra San Miguel

Smart Araneta Coliseum

March 6, 2022
11:45 am

Report

Pioneer Pro Tibay	19–14	Purefoods TJ Titans

Smart Araneta Coliseum

March 6, 2022
12:10 pm

Report

Limitless Appmasters	21–20	TNT Tropang Giga

Smart Araneta Coliseum

==== Semifinals ====
March 6, 2022
12:35 pm

Report

Pioneer Pro Tibay	19–21	San Miguel Beermen

Smart Araneta Coliseum

March 6, 2022
1:00 pm

Report

Barangay Ginebra San Miguel	21–18	Limitless Appmasters

Smart Araneta Coliseum

==== Third place game ====
March 6, 2022
1:40 pm

Report

Pioneer Pro Tibay	13–21	Limitless Appmasters

Smart Araneta Coliseum

==== Finals ====
March 6, 2022
2:05 pm

Report

San Miguel Beermen	21–15	Barangay Ginebra San Miguel

Smart Araneta Coliseum

=== Final standings ===
Pos	Team	Pld	W	L	PCT	AVG	PF	Tour points
1	San Miguel Beermen	7	5	2	.714	20.3	142	100
2	Barangay Ginebra San Miguel	6	4	2	.667	19.0	114	80
3	Limitless Appmasters	6	5	1	.833	20.3	122	70
4	Pioneer Pro Tibay	7	5	2	.714	19.0	133	60
Eliminated at the quarterfinals
5	Meralco Bolts 3x3	4	3	1	.750	18.5	74	50
6	TNT Tropang Giga	5	3	2	.600	18.0	90	45
7	Platinum Karaoke	4	2	2	.500	18.8	75	40
8	Purefoods TJ Titans	5	2	3	.400	17.2	86	35
Eliminated at the knockout game
9	NorthPort Batang Pier	4	1	3	.250	17.3	69	20
Eliminated at the preliminary round
10	Sista Super Sealers	4	1	3	.250	16.0	64	18
11	Cavitex Braves	3	0	3	.000	16.0	48	16
12	Terrafirma 3x3	3	0	3	.000	15.3	46	14
13	Master Sardines Fishing Champs	4	0	4	.000	15.0	60	12

Source: PBA 3x3

== 3rd leg ==
=== Groupings ===
Pool A	Pool B	Pool C
San Miguel Beermen (1); TNT Tropang Giga (6); Platinum Karaoke (7); Terrafirma 3x3 (12); Master Sardines Fishing Champs (13)	Barangay Ginebra San Miguel (2); Meralco Bolts 3x3 (5); Purefoods TJ Titans (8); Cavitex Braves (11)	Limitless Appmasters (3); Pioneer Pro Tibay (4); NorthPort Batang Pier (9); Sista Super Sealers (10)

=== Preliminary round ===
==== Pool A ====
Pos	Team	Pld	W	L	PF	PA	PD	PCT	Qualification
1	TNT Tropang Giga	4	4	0	85	73	+12	1.000	Quarterfinals
2	San Miguel Beermen	4	2	2	75	67	+8	.500 (Note: San Miguel Beermen 1–0 Terrafirma 3x3)	Quarterfinals
3	Terrafirma 3x3	4	2	2	72	72	0	.500	Quarterfinals
4	Master Sardines Fishing Champs	4	1	3	61	77	−16	.250 (Note: Master Sardines Fishing Champs 1–0 Platinum Karaoke)	
5	Platinum Karaoke	4	1	3	77	81	−4	.250	

Source: PBA 3x3
Rules for classification: 1) Wins; Win ratio if unequal number of games; 2) Head-to-head record; 3) Average points per game; 4) Higher seed.
Notes:

March 12, 2022
8:00 am

Report

Platinum Karaoke	19–18	San Miguel Beermen

Smart Araneta Coliseum

March 12, 2022
8:25 am

Report

Terrafirma 3x3	14–12	Master Sardines Fishing Champs

Smart Araneta Coliseum

March 12, 2022
9:40 am

Report

TNT Tropang Giga	21–20	Platinum Karaoke

Smart Araneta Coliseum

March 12, 2022
10:05 am

Report

San Miguel Beermen	21–17	Terrafirma 3x3

Smart Araneta Coliseum

March 12, 2022
11:20 am

Report

TNT Tropang Giga	22–18	Master Sardines Fishing Champs

Smart Araneta Coliseum

March 12, 2022
11:45 am

Report

Platinum Karaoke	18–21	Terrafirma 3x3

Smart Araneta Coliseum

March 12, 2022
1:00 pm

Report

Terrafirma 3x3	20–21	TNT Tropang Giga

Smart Araneta Coliseum

March 12, 2022
1:25 pm

Report

Master Sardines Fishing Champs	10–21	San Miguel Beermen

Smart Araneta Coliseum

March 13, 2022
8:00 am

Report

San Miguel Beermen	15–21	TNT Tropang Giga

Smart Araneta Coliseum

March 13, 2022
8:25 am

Report

Master Sardines Fishing Champs	21–20	Platinum Karaoke

Smart Araneta Coliseum

==== Pool B ====
Pos	Team	Pld	W	L	PF	PA	PD	PCT	Qualification
1	Meralco Bolts 3x3	3	2	1	58	45	+13	.667 (Note: Meralco Bolts 3x3 1–0 Cavitex Braves)	Quarterfinals
2	Cavitex Braves	3	2	1	53	46	+7	.667	Quarterfinals
3	Barangay Ginebra San Miguel	3	1	2	54	62	−8	.333 (Note: Barangay Ginebra San Miguel 1–0 Purefoods Tender Juicy Titans)	Knockout game
4	Purefoods TJ Titans	3	1	2	46	58	−12	.333	

Source: PBA 3x3
Rules for classification: 1) Wins; Win ratio if unequal number of games; 2) Head-to-head record; 3) Average points per game; 4) Higher seed.
Notes:

March 12, 2022
8:50 am

Report

Purefoods TJ Titans	20–21	Barangay Ginebra San Miguel

Smart Araneta Coliseum

March 12, 2022
10:30 am

Report

Barangay Ginebra San Miguel	18–21	Meralco Bolts 3x3

Smart Araneta Coliseum

March 12, 2022
12:10 pm

Report

Cavitex Braves	22–9	Purefoods TJ Titans

Smart Araneta Coliseum

March 12, 2022
1:50 pm

Report

Meralco Bolts 3x3	22–10	Cavitex Braves

Smart Araneta Coliseum

March 13, 2022
8:50 am

Report

Meralco Bolts 3x3	15–17	Purefoods TJ Titans

Smart Araneta Coliseum

March 13, 2022
9:40 am

Report

Barangay Ginebra San Miguel	15–21	Cavitex Braves

Smart Araneta Coliseum

==== Pool C ====
Pos	Team	Pld	W	L	PF	PA	PD	PCT	Qualification
1	Limitless Appmasters	3	3	0	62	38	+24	1.000	Quarterfinals
2	Sista Super Sealers	3	2	1	56	47	+9	.667	Quarterfinals
3	Pioneer Pro Tibay	3	1	2	40	61	−21	.333	Knockout game
4	NorthPort Batang Pier	3	0	3	52	64	−12	.000	

Source: PBA 3x3
Rules for classification: 1) Wins; Win ratio if unequal number of games; 2) Head-to-head record; 3) Average points per game; 4) Higher seed.

March 12, 2022
9:15 am

Report

Limitless Appmasters	21–6	Pioneer Pro Tibay

Smart Araneta Coliseum

March 12, 2022
10:55 am

Report

Sista Super Sealers	22–14	NorthPort Batang Pier

Smart Araneta Coliseum

March 12, 2022
12:35 pm

Report

Limitless Appmasters	20–13	Sista Super Sealers

Smart Araneta Coliseum

March 12, 2022
2:15 pm

Report

Pioneer Pro Tibay	21–19	NorthPort Batang Pier

Smart Araneta Coliseum

March 13, 2022
9:15 am

Report

Pioneer Pro Tibay	13–21	Sista Super Sealers

Smart Araneta Coliseum

March 13, 2022
10:05 am

Report

NorthPort Batang Pier	19–21	Limitless Appmasters

Smart Araneta Coliseum

=== Knockout stage ===
Limitless Appmasters defeated TNT Tropang Giga in the finals, 21–20, to become the third leg champions.

==== Bracket ====
Knockout game
B3	Barangay Ginebra San Miguel	15
C3	Pioneer Pro Tibay	18

Quarterfinals
A1	TNT Tropang Giga	21
C3	Pioneer Pro Tibay	8
B2	Cavitex Braves	18
A3	Terrafirma 3x3	20
B1	Meralco Bolts 3x3	20
C2	Sista Super Sealers	16
A2	San Miguel Beermen	14
C1	Limitless Appmasters	21

Semifinals
A1	TNT Tropang Giga	21
A3	Terrafirma 3x3	19
B1	Meralco Bolts 3x3	11
C1	Limitless Appmasters	16

Finals
A1	TNT Tropang Giga	20
C1	Limitless Appmasters	21
Third place
A3	Terrafirma 3x3	18
B1	Meralco Bolts 3x3	21

==== Knockout game ====
March 13, 2022
10:30 am

Report

Barangay Ginebra San Miguel	15–18	Pioneer Pro Tibay

Smart Araneta Coliseum

==== Quarterfinals ====
March 13, 2022
10:55 am

Report

San Miguel Beermen	14–21	Limitless Appmasters

Smart Araneta Coliseum

March 13, 2022
11:20 am

Report

Cavitex Braves	18–20	Terrafirma 3x3

Smart Araneta Coliseum

March 13, 2022
11:45 am

Report

TNT Tropang Giga	21–8	Pioneer Pro Tibay

Smart Araneta Coliseum

March 13, 2022
12:10 pm

Report

Meralco Bolts 3x3	20–16	Sista Super Sealers

Smart Araneta Coliseum

==== Semifinals ====
March 13, 2022
12:35 pm

Report

TNT Tropang Giga	21–19	Terrafirma 3x3

Smart Araneta Coliseum

March 13, 2022
1:00 pm

Report

Meralco Bolts 3x3	11–16	Limitless Appmasters

Smart Araneta Coliseum

==== Third place game ====
March 13, 2022
1:45 pm

Report

Terrafirma 3x3	18–21	Meralco Bolts 3x3

Smart Araneta Coliseum

==== Finals ====
March 13, 2022
2:10 pm

Report

TNT Tropang Giga	20–21	Limitless Appmasters

Smart Araneta Coliseum

=== Final standings ===
Pos	Team	Pld	W	L	PCT	AVG	PF	Tour points
1	Limitless Appmasters	6	6	0	1.000	20.0	120	100
2	TNT Tropang Giga	7	6	1	.857	21.0	147	80
3	Meralco Bolts 3x3	6	4	2	.667	18.3	110	70
4	Terrafirma 3x3	7	3	4	.429	18.4	129	60
Eliminated at the quarterfinals
5	Sista Super Sealers	4	2	2	.500	18.0	72	50
6	Cavitex Braves	4	2	2	.500	17.8	71	45
7	San Miguel Beermen	5	2	3	.400	17.8	89	40
8	Pioneer Pro Tibay	5	2	3	.400	13.2	66	35
Eliminated at the knockout game
9	Barangay Ginebra San Miguel	4	1	3	.250	17.3	69	20
Eliminated at the preliminary round
10	Purefoods TJ Titans	3	1	2	.333	15.3	46	18
11	Platinum Karaoke	4	1	3	.250	19.3	77	16
12	Master Sardines Fishing Champs	4	1	3	.250	15.3	61	14
13	NorthPort Batang Pier	3	0	3	.000	17.3	52	12

Source: PBA 3x3

== 4th leg ==
=== Groupings ===
Pool A	Pool B	Pool C
Limitless Appmasters (1); Cavitex Braves (6); San Miguel Beermen (7); Master Sardines Fishing Champs (12); NorthPort Batang Pier (13)	TNT Tropang Giga (2); Sista Super Sealers (5); Pioneer Pro Tibay (8); Platinum Karaoke (11)	Meralco Bolts 3x3 (3); Terrafirma 3x3 (4); Barangay Ginebra San Miguel (9); Purefoods TJ Titans (10)

=== Preliminary round ===
==== Pool A ====
Pos	Team	Pld	W	L	PF	PA	PD	PCT	Qualification
1	Limitless Appmasters	4	4	0	82	56	+26	1.000	Quarterfinals
2	San Miguel Beermen	4	3	1	78	64	+14	.750	Quarterfinals
3	Master Sardines Fishing Champs	4	2	2	68	68	0	.500	Quarterfinals
4	Cavitex Braves	4	1	3	68	76	−8	.250	
5	NorthPort Batang Pier	4	0	4	52	84	−32	.000	

Source: PBA 3x3
Rules for classification: 1) Wins; Win ratio if unequal number of games; 2) Head-to-head record; 3) Average points per game; 4) Higher seed.

March 19, 2022
8:00 am

Report

Master Sardines Fishing Champs	21–10	NorthPort Batang Pier

Smart Araneta Coliseum

March 19, 2022
8:25 am

Report

Cavitex Braves	16–21	San Miguel Beermen

Smart Araneta Coliseum

March 19, 2022
9:40 am

Report

NorthPort Batang Pier	13–21	San Miguel Beermen

Smart Araneta Coliseum

March 19, 2022
10:05 am

Report

Limitless Appmasters	21–12	Master Sardines Fishing Champs

Smart Araneta Coliseum

March 19, 2022
11:20 am

Report

NorthPort Batang Pier	14–21	Limitless Appmasters

Smart Araneta Coliseum

March 19, 2022
11:45 am

Report

Master Sardines Fishing Champs	21–16	Cavitex Braves

Smart Araneta Coliseum

March 19, 2022
1:00 pm

Report

San Miguel Beermen	15–21	Limitless Appmasters

Smart Araneta Coliseum

March 19, 2022
1:25 pm

Report

Cavitex Braves	21–15	NorthPort Batang Pier

Smart Araneta Coliseum

March 20, 2022
2:00 pm

Report

San Miguel Beermen	21–14	Master Sardines Fishing Champs

Smart Araneta Coliseum

March 20, 2022
3:15 pm

Report

Limitless Appmasters	19–15	Cavitex Braves

Smart Araneta Coliseum

==== Pool B ====
Pos	Team	Pld	W	L	PF	PA	PD	PCT	Qualification
1	Platinum Karaoke	3	2	1	49	55	−6	.667 (Note: Platinum Karaoke 1–0 TNT Tropang Giga)	Quarterfinals
2	TNT Tropang Giga	3	2	1	55	53	+2	.667	Quarterfinals
3	Pioneer Pro Tibay	3	1	2	61	55	+6	.333 (Note: Pioneer Pro Tibay 1–0 Sista Super Sealers)	Knockout game
4	Sista Super Sealers	3	1	2	52	54	−2	.333	

Source: PBA 3x3
Rules for classification: 1) Wins; Win ratio if unequal number of games; 2) Head-to-head record; 3) Average points per game; 4) Higher seed.
Notes:

March 19, 2022
8:50 am

Report

Sista Super Sealers	13–21	Pioneer Pro Tibay

Smart Araneta Coliseum

March 19, 2022
10:30 am

Report

TNT Tropang Giga	13–16	Platinum Karaoke

Smart Araneta Coliseum

March 19, 2022
12:10 pm

Report

TNT Tropang Giga	21–17	Sista Super Sealers

Smart Araneta Coliseum

March 19, 2022
1:50 pm

Report

Platinum Karaoke	21–20	Pioneer Pro Tibay

Smart Araneta Coliseum

March 20, 2022
2:25 pm

Report

Sista Super Sealers	22–12	Platinum Karaoke

Smart Araneta Coliseum

March 20, 2022
3:40 pm

Report

Pioneer Pro Tibay	20–21	TNT Tropang Giga

Smart Araneta Coliseum

==== Pool C ====
Pos	Team	Pld	W	L	PF	PA	PD	PCT	Qualification
1	Barangay Ginebra San Miguel	3	2	1	56	49	+7	.667 (Note: Barangay Ginebra San Miguel 1–0 Meralco Bolts 3x3)	Quarterfinals
2	Meralco Bolts 3x3	3	2	1	53	54	−1	.667	Quarterfinals
3	Purefoods TJ Titans	3	1	2	54	59	−5	.333 (Note: Purefoods TJ Titans 1–0 Terrafirma 3x3)	Knockout game
4	Terrafirma 3x3	3	1	2	55	56	−1	.333	

Source: PBA 3x3
Rules for classification: 1) Wins; Win ratio if unequal number of games; 2) Head-to-head record; 3) Average points per game; 4) Higher seed.
Notes:

March 19, 2022
9:15 am

Report

Terrafirma 3x3	18–16	Barangay Ginebra San Miguel

Smart Araneta Coliseum

March 19, 2022
10:55 am

Report

Meralco Bolts 3x3	19–17	Terrafirma 3x3

Smart Araneta Coliseum

March 19, 2022
12:35 pm

Report

Purefoods TJ Titans	17–19	Barangay Ginebra San Miguel

Smart Araneta Coliseum

March 19, 2022
2:15 pm

Report

Meralco Bolts 3x3	20–16	Purefoods TJ Titans

Smart Araneta Coliseum

March 20, 2022
2:50 pm

Report

Barangay Ginebra San Miguel	21–14	Meralco Bolts 3x3

Smart Araneta Coliseum

March 20, 2022
4:05 pm

Report

Terrafirma 3x3	20–21	Purefoods TJ Titans

Smart Araneta Coliseum

=== Knockout stage ===
Meralco Bolts 3x3 defeated Limitless Appmasters in the finals, 17–14, to become the fourth leg champions.

==== Bracket ====
Knockout game
B3	Pioneer Pro Tibay	21
C3	Purefoods TJ Titans	18

Quarterfinals
A1	Limitless Appmasters	22
B3	Pioneer Pro Tibay	20
B2	TNT Tropang Giga	21
A3	Master Sardines Fishing Champs	16
B1	Platinum Karaoke	16
C2	Meralco Bolts 3x3	19
C1	Barangay Ginebra San Miguel	16
A2	San Miguel Beermen	21

Semifinals
A1	Limitless Appmasters	20
B2	TNT Tropang Giga	19
C2	Meralco Bolts 3x3	21
A2	San Miguel Beermen	15

Finals
A1	Limitless Appmasters	14
C2	Meralco Bolts 3x3	17
Third place
B2	TNT Tropang Giga	21
A2	San Miguel Beermen	17

==== Knockout game ====
March 20, 2022
4:30 pm

Report

Pioneer Pro Tibay	21–18	Purefoods TJ Titans

Smart Araneta Coliseum

==== Quarterfinals ====
March 20, 2022
4:55 pm

Report

TNT Tropang Giga	21–16	Master Sardines Fishing Champs

Smart Araneta Coliseum

March 20, 2022
5:20 pm

Report

Platinum Karaoke	16–19	Meralco Bolts 3x3

Smart Araneta Coliseum

March 20, 2022
5:45 pm

Report

Limitless Appmasters	22–20	Pioneer Pro Tibay

Smart Araneta Coliseum

March 20, 2022
6:10 pm

Report

Barangay Ginebra San Miguel	16–21	San Miguel Beermen

Smart Araneta Coliseum

==== Semifinals ====
March 20, 2022
6:35 pm

Report

Limitless Appmasters	20–19	TNT Tropang Giga

Smart Araneta Coliseum

March 20, 2022
7:00 pm

Report

Meralco Bolts 3x3	21–15	San Miguel Beermen

Smart Araneta Coliseum

==== Third place game ====
March 20, 2022
7:50 pm

Report

TNT Tropang Giga	21–17	San Miguel Beermen

Smart Araneta Coliseum

==== Finals ====
March 20, 2022
8:15 pm

Report

Limitless Appmasters	14–17	Meralco Bolts 3x3

Smart Araneta Coliseum

=== Final standings ===
Pos	Team	Pld	W	L	PCT	AVG	PF	Tour points
1	Meralco Bolts 3x3	6	5	1	.833	18.3	110	100
2	Limitless Appmasters	7	6	1	.857	19.7	138	80
3	TNT Tropang Giga	6	4	2	.667	19.3	116	70
4	San Miguel Beermen	7	4	3	.932	18.7	131	60
Eliminated at the quarterfinals
5	Barangay Ginebra San Miguel	4	2	2	.500	18.0	72	50
6	Platinum Karaoke	4	2	2	.500	16.3	65	45
7	Pioneer Pro Tibay	5	2	3	.400	20.4	102	40
8	Master Sardines Fishing Champs	5	2	3	.400	16.8	84	35
Eliminated at the knockout game
9	Purefoods TJ Titans	4	1	3	.250	18.0	72	20
Eliminated at the preliminary round
10	Terrafirma 3x3	3	1	2	.333	18.3	55	18
11	Sista Super Sealers	3	1	2	.333	17.3	52	16
12	Cavitex Braves	4	1	3	.250	17.0	68	14
13	NorthPort Batang Pier	4	0	4	.000	13.0	52	12

Source: PBA 3x3

== 5th leg ==
=== Groupings ===
Pool A	Pool B	Pool C
Meralco Bolts 3x3 (1); Platinum Karaoke (6); Pioneer Pro Tibay (7); Cavitex Braves (12); NorthPort Batang Pier (13)	Limitless Appmasters (2); Barangay Ginebra San Miguel (5); Master Sardines Fishing Champs (8); Sista Super Sealers (11)	TNT Tropang Giga (3); San Miguel Beermen (4); Purefoods TJ Titans (9); Terrafirma 3x3 (10)

=== Preliminary round ===
==== Pool A ====
Pos	Team	Pld	W	L	PF	PA	PD	PCT	Qualification
1	Pioneer Pro Tibay	4	3	1	73	65	+8	.750 (Note: Pioneer Pro Tibay 1–0 Meralco Bolts 3x3)	Quarterfinals
2	Meralco Bolts 3x3	4	3	1	76	68	+8	.750	Quarterfinals
3	Platinum Karaoke	4	2	2	69	69	0	.500 (Note: Platinum Karaoke 1–0 Cavitex Braves)	Quarterfinals
4	Cavitex Braves	4	2	2	73	73	0	.500	
5	NorthPort Batang Pier	4	0	4	66	82	−16	.000	

Source: PBA 3x3
Rules for classification: 1) Wins; Win ratio if unequal number of games; 2) Head-to-head record; 3) Average points per game; 4) Higher seed.
Notes:

April 2, 2022
8:00 am

Report

Platinum Karaoke	11–13	Pioneer Pro Tibay

Smart Araneta Coliseum

April 2, 2022
8:25 am

Report

Cavitex Braves	19–18	NorthPort Batang Pier

Smart Araneta Coliseum

April 2, 2022
9:40 am

Report

Meralco Bolts 3x3	21–19	Platinum Karaoke

Smart Araneta Coliseum

April 2, 2022
10:05 am

Report

NorthPort Batang Pier	17–21	Pioneer Pro Tibay

Smart Araneta Coliseum

April 2, 2022
11:20 am

Report

Platinum Karaoke	21–18	NorthPort Batang Pier

Smart Araneta Coliseum

April 2, 2022
11:45 am

Report

Meralco Bolts 3x3	18–16	Cavitex Braves

Smart Araneta Coliseum

April 2, 2022
1:00 pm

Report

Pioneer Pro Tibay	19–21	Cavitex Braves

Smart Araneta Coliseum

April 2, 2022
1:25 pm

Report

NorthPort Batang Pier	13–21	Meralco Bolts 3x3

Smart Araneta Coliseum

April 3, 2022
2:00 pm

Report

Cavitex Braves	17–18	Platinum Karaoke

Smart Araneta Coliseum

April 3, 2022
3:15 pm

Report

Pioneer Pro Tibay	20–16	Meralco Bolts 3x3

Smart Araneta Coliseum

==== Pool B ====
Pos	Team	Pld	W	L	PF	PA	PD	PCT	Qualification
1	Limitless Appmasters	3	3	0	63	36	+27	1.000	Quarterfinals
2	Sista Super Sealers	3	2	1	52	55	−3	.667	Quarterfinals
3	Master Sardines Fishing Champs	3	1	2	53	60	−7	.333	Knockout game
4	Barangay Ginebra San Miguel	3	0	3	46	63	−17	.000	

Source: PBA 3x3
Rules for classification: 1) Wins; Win ratio if unequal number of games; 2) Head-to-head record; 3) Average points per game; 4) Higher seed.

April 2, 2022
9:15 am

Report

Barangay Ginebra San Miguel	20–21	Master Sardines Fishing Champs

Smart Araneta Coliseum

April 2, 2022
10:55 am

Report

Barangay Ginebra San Miguel	17–21	Sista Super Sealers

Smart Araneta Coliseum

April 2, 2022
12:35 pm

Report

Limitless Appmasters	21–12	Sista Super Sealers

Smart Araneta Coliseum

April 2, 2022
2:15 pm

Report

Master Sardines Fishing Champs	15–21	Limitless Appmasters

Smart Araneta Coliseum

April 3, 2022
2:50 pm

Report

Sista Super Sealers	19–17	Master Sardines Fishing Champs

Smart Araneta Coliseum

April 3, 2022
3:40 pm

Report

Limitless Appmasters	21–9	Barangay Ginebra San Miguel

Smart Araneta Coliseum

==== Pool C ====
Pos	Team	Pld	W	L	PF	PA	PD	PCT	Qualification
1	Purefoods TJ Titans	3	3	0	63	41	+22	1.000	Quarterfinals
2	San Miguel Beermen	3	1	2	56	58	−2	.333 (Note: San Miguel Beermen 18.7 avg. points; TNT Tropang Giga 17.3 avg. points; Terrafirma 3x3 14.7 avg. points.)	Quarterfinals
3	TNT Tropang Giga	3	1	2	52	55	−3	.333	Knockout game
4	Terrafirma 3x3	3	1	2	44	61	−17	.333	

Source: PBA 3x3
Rules for classification: 1) Wins; Win ratio if unequal number of games; 2) Head-to-head record; 3) Average points per game; 4) Higher seed.
Notes:

April 2, 2022
8:50 am

Report

TNT Tropang Giga	21–13	Terrafirma 3x3

Smart Araneta Coliseum

April 2, 2022
10:30 am

Report

San Miguel Beermen	16–21	Purefoods TJ Titans

Smart Araneta Coliseum

April 2, 2022
12:10 pm

Report

San Miguel Beermen	19–21	Terrafirma 3x3

Smart Araneta Coliseum

April 2, 2022
1:50 pm

Report

Purefoods TJ Titans	21–15	TNT Tropang Giga

Smart Araneta Coliseum

April 3, 2022
2:25 pm

Report

Terrafirma 3x3	10–21	Purefoods TJ Titans

Smart Araneta Coliseum

April 3, 2022
4:05 pm

Report

TNT Tropang Giga	16–21	San Miguel Beermen

Smart Araneta Coliseum

=== Knockout stage ===
Limitless Appmasters defeated TNT Tropang Giga in the finals, 22–19, to become the fifth leg champions.

==== Bracket ====
Knockout game
B3	Master Sardines Fishing Champs	7
C3	TNT Tropang Giga	21

Quarterfinals
A1	Pioneer Pro Tibay	18
C3	TNT Tropang Giga	22
B2	Sista Super Sealers	17
A3	Platinum Karaoke	21
B1	Limitless Appmasters	21
C2	San Miguel Beermen	16
C1	Purefoods TJ Titans	21
A2	Meralco Bolts 3x3	13

Semifinals
C3	TNT Tropang Giga	21
A3	Platinum Karaoke	15
B1	Limitless Appmasters	21
C1	Purefoods TJ Titans	9

Finals
C3	TNT Tropang Giga	19
B1	Limitless Appmasters	22
Third place
A3	Platinum Karaoke	18
C1	Purefoods TJ Titans	17

==== Knockout game ====
April 3, 2022
4:30 pm

Report

Master Sardines Fishing Champs	7–21	TNT Tropang Giga

Smart Araneta Coliseum

==== Quarterfinals ====
April 3, 2022
4:55 pm

Report

Purefoods TJ Titans	21–13	Meralco Bolts 3x3

Smart Araneta Coliseum

April 3, 2022
5:20 pm

Report

Sista Super Sealers	17–21	Platinum Karaoke

Smart Araneta Coliseum

April 3, 2022
5:45 pm

Report

Pioneer Pro Tibay	18–22	TNT Tropang Giga

Smart Araneta Coliseum

April 3, 2022
6:10 pm

Report

Limitless Appmasters	21–16	San Miguel Beermen

Smart Araneta Coliseum

==== Semifinals ====
April 3, 2022
6:35 pm

Report

TNT Tropang Giga	21–15	Platinum Karaoke

Smart Araneta Coliseum

April 3, 2022
7:00 pm

Report

Limitless Appmasters	21–9	Purefoods TJ Titans

Smart Araneta Coliseum

==== Third place game ====
April 3, 2022
7:45 pm

Report

Platinum Karaoke	18–17	Purefoods TJ Titans

Smart Araneta Coliseum

==== Finals ====
April 3, 2022
8:10 pm

Report

TNT Tropang Giga	19–22	Limitless Appmasters

Smart Araneta Coliseum

=== Final standings ===
Pos	Team	Pld	W	L	PCT	AVG	PF	Tour points
1	Limitless Appmasters	6	6	0	1.000	21.2	127	100
2	TNT Tropang Giga	7	4	3	.571	19.3	135	80
3	Platinum Karaoke	7	4	3	.571	17.6	123	70
4	Purefoods TJ Titans	6	4	2	.667	18.3	110	60
Eliminated at the quarterfinals
5	Pioneer Pro Tibay	5	3	2	.600	18.2	91	50
6	Meralco Bolts 3x3	5	3	2	.600	17.8	89	45
7	Sista Super Sealers	4	2	2	.500	17.3	69	40
8	San Miguel Beermen	4	1	3	.250	18.0	72	35
Eliminated at the knockout game
9	Master Sardines Fishing Champs	4	1	3	.250	15.0	60	20
Eliminated at the preliminary round
10	Cavitex Braves	4	2	2	.500	18.3	73	18
11	Terrafirma 3x3	3	1	2	.333	14.7	44	16
12	NorthPort Batang Pier	4	0	4	.000	16.5	66	14
13	Barangay Ginebra San Miguel	3	0	3	.000	15.3	46	12

Source: PBA 3x3

== 6th leg ==
=== Groupings ===
Pool A	Pool B	Pool C
Limitless Appmasters (1); Meralco Bolts 3x3 (6); Sista Super Sealers (7); NorthPort Batang Pier (12); Barangay Ginebra San Miguel (13)	TNT Tropang Giga (2); Pioneer Pro Tibay (5); San Miguel Beermen (8); Terrafirma 3x3 (11)	Platinum Karaoke (3); Purefoods TJ Titans (4); Master Sardines Fishing Champs (9); Cavitex Braves (10)

=== Preliminary round ===
==== Pool A ====
Pos	Team	Pld	W	L	PF	PA	PD	PCT	Qualification
1	Meralco Bolts 3x3	4	4	0	84	58	+26	1.000	Quarterfinals
2	Barangay Ginebra San Miguel	4	2	2	74	69	+5	.500 (Note: Barangay Ginebra San Miguel 1–0 Limitless Appmasters)	Quarterfinals
3	Limitless Appmasters	4	2	2	79	71	+8	.500	Quarterfinals
4	Sista Super Sealers	4	1	3	51	77	−26	.250 (Note: Sista Super Sealers 1–0 NorthPort Batang Pier)	
5	NorthPort Batang Pier	4	1	3	62	75	−13	.250	

Source: PBA 3x3
Rules for classification: 1) Wins; Win ratio if unequal number of games; 2) Head-to-head record; 3) Average points per game; 4) Higher seed.
Notes:

April 12, 2022
8:00 am

Report

Limitless Appmasters	22–15	NorthPort Batang Pier

Smart Araneta Coliseum

April 12, 2022
8:25 am

Report

Barangay Ginebra San Miguel	21–11	Sista Super Sealers

Smart Araneta Coliseum

April 12, 2022
9:40 am

Report

Meralco Bolts 3x3	21–11	Sista Super Sealers

Smart Araneta Coliseum

April 12, 2022
10:05 am

Report

NorthPort Batang Pier	21–16	Barangay Ginebra San Miguel

Smart Araneta Coliseum

April 12, 2022
11:20 am

Report

Barangay Ginebra San Miguel	21–17	Limitless Appmasters

Smart Araneta Coliseum

April 12, 2022
11:45 am

Report

NorthPort Batang Pier	13–21	Meralco Bolts 3x3

Smart Araneta Coliseum

April 12, 2022
1:00 pm

Report

Limitless Appmasters	18–22	Meralco Bolts 3x3

Smart Araneta Coliseum

April 12, 2022
1:50 pm

Report

Sista Super Sealers	16–13	NorthPort Batang Pier

Smart Araneta Coliseum

April 13, 2022
9:50 am

Report

Meralco Bolts 3x3	20–16	Barangay Ginebra San Miguel

Smart Araneta Coliseum

April 13, 2022
11:05 am

Report

Sista Super Sealers	13–22	Limitless Appmasters

Smart Araneta Coliseum

==== Pool B ====
Pos	Team	Pld	W	L	PF	PA	PD	PCT	Qualification
1	Pioneer Pro Tibay	3	3	0	54	48	+6	1.000	Quarterfinals
2	TNT Tropang Giga	3	2	1	62	55	+7	.667	Quarterfinals
3	San Miguel Beermen	3	1	2	55	52	+3	.333	Knockout game
4	Terrafirma 3x3	3	0	3	42	58	−16	.000	

Source: PBA 3x3
Rules for classification: 1) Wins; Win ratio if unequal number of games; 2) Head-to-head record; 3) Average points per game; 4) Higher seed.

April 12, 2022
8:50 am

Report

Pioneer Pro Tibay	17–16	San Miguel Beermen

Smart Araneta Coliseum

April 12, 2022
10:30 am

Report

TNT Tropang Giga	21–16	Terrafirma 3x3

Smart Araneta Coliseum

April 12, 2022
12:10 pm

Report

San Miguel Beermen	18–21	TNT Tropang Giga

Smart Araneta Coliseum

April 12, 2022
1:25 pm

Report

Pioneer Pro Tibay	16–12	Terrafirma 3x3

Smart Araneta Coliseum

April 13, 2022
9:25 am

Report

TNT Tropang Giga	20–21	Pioneer Pro Tibay

Smart Araneta Coliseum

April 13, 2022
10:40 am

Report

Terrafirma 3x3	14–21	San Miguel Beermen

Smart Araneta Coliseum

==== Pool C ====
Pos	Team	Pld	W	L	PF	PA	PD	PCT	Qualification
1	Purefoods TJ Titans	3	3	0	62	46	+16	1.000	Quarterfinals
2	Platinum Karaoke	3	2	1	59	54	+5	.667	Quarterfinals
3	Cavitex Braves	3	1	2	57	58	−1	.333	Knockout game
4	Master Sardines Fishing Champs	3	0	3	43	63	−20	.000	

Source: PBA 3x3
Rules for classification: 1) Wins; Win ratio if unequal number of games; 2) Head-to-head record; 3) Average points per game; 4) Higher seed.

April 12, 2022
9:15 am

Report

Cavitex Braves	21–16	Master Sardines Fishing Champs

Smart Araneta Coliseum

April 12, 2022
10:55 am

Report

Purefoods TJ Titans	21–9	Master Sardines Fishing Champs

Smart Araneta Coliseum

April 12, 2022
12:35 pm

Report

Platinum Karaoke	21–16	Cavitex Braves

Smart Araneta Coliseum

April 12, 2022
2:15 pm

Report

Platinum Karaoke	17–20	Purefoods TJ Titans

Smart Araneta Coliseum

April 13, 2022
9:00 am

Report

Purefoods TJ Titans	21–20	Cavitex Braves

Smart Araneta Coliseum

April 13, 2022
10:15 am

Report

Master Sardines Fishing Champs	18–21	Platinum Karaoke

Smart Araneta Coliseum

=== Knockout stage ===
San Miguel Beermen defeated Pioneer Pro Tibay in the finals, 21–17, to become the sixth leg champions.

==== Bracket ====
Knockout game
B3	San Miguel Beermen	21
C3	Cavitex Braves	17

Quarterfinals
A1	Meralco Bolts 3x3	20
B3	San Miguel Beermen	21
B2	TNT Tropang Giga	21
A3	Limitless Appmasters	19
B1	Pioneer Pro Tibay	21
C2	Platinum Karaoke	18
C1	Purefoods TJ Titans	21
A2	Barangay Ginebra San Miguel	17

Semifinals
B3	San Miguel Beermen	21
B2	TNT Tropang Giga	20
B1	Pioneer Pro Tibay	16
C1	Purefoods TJ Titans	13

Finals
B3	San Miguel Beermen	21
B1	Pioneer Pro Tibay	17
Third place
B2	TNT Tropang Giga	20
C1	Purefoods TJ Titans	21

==== Knockout game ====
April 13, 2022
11:30 am

Report

San Miguel Beermen	21–17	Cavitex Braves

Smart Araneta Coliseum

==== Quarterfinals ====
April 13, 2022
11:55 am

Report

Purefoods TJ Titans	21–17	Barangay Ginebra San Miguel

Smart Araneta Coliseum

April 13, 2022
12:20 pm

Report

TNT Tropang Giga	21–19	Limitless Appmasters

Smart Araneta Coliseum

April 13, 2022
12:45 pm

Report

Meralco Bolts 3x3	20–21	San Miguel Beermen

Smart Araneta Coliseum

April 13, 2022
1:10 pm

Report

Pioneer Pro Tibay	21–18	Platinum Karaoke

Smart Araneta Coliseum

==== Semifinals ====
April 13, 2022
1:50 pm

Report

San Miguel Beermen	21–20	TNT Tropang Giga

Smart Araneta Coliseum

April 13, 2022
2:15 pm

Report

Pioneer Pro Tibay	16–13	Purefoods TJ Titans

Smart Araneta Coliseum

==== Third place game ====
April 13, 2022
2:50 pm

Report

TNT Tropang Giga	20–21	Purefoods TJ Titans

Smart Araneta Coliseum

==== Finals ====
April 13, 2022
3:15 pm

Report

San Miguel Beermen	21–17	Pioneer Pro Tibay

Smart Araneta Coliseum

=== Final standings ===
Pos	Team	Pld	W	L	PCT	AVG	PF	Tour points
1	San Miguel Beermen	7	5	2	.833	19.9	139	100
2	Pioneer Pro Tibay	6	5	1	.833	18.0	108	80
3	Purefoods TJ Titans	6	5	1	.833	19.5	117	70
4	TNT Tropang Giga	6	3	3	.500	20.5	123	60
Eliminated at the quarterfinals
5	Meralco Bolts 3x3	5	4	1	.800	20.8	104	50
6	Platinum Karaoke	4	2	2	.500	19.3	77	45
7	Limitless Appmasters	5	2	3	.400	19.6	98	40
8	Barangay Ginebra San Miguel	5	2	3	.400	18.2	91	35
Eliminated at the knockout game
9	Cavitex Braves	4	1	3	.250	18.5	74	20
Eliminated at the preliminary round
10	NorthPort Batang Pier	4	1	3	.250	15.5	62	18
11	Sista Super Sealers	4	1	3	.250	12.8	51	16
12	Master Sardines Fishing Champs	3	0	3	.000	14.3	43	14
13	Terrafirma 3x3	3	0	3	.000	14.0	42	12

Source: PBA 3x3

== Legs summary ==
Pos	Team	1st leg	2nd leg	3rd leg	4th leg	5th leg	6th leg	Pts	Qualification
1	Limitless Appmasters	4th	3rd	1st	2nd	1st	7th	450	Qualification to Grand Finals quarterfinal round
2	TNT Tropang Giga	1st	6th	2nd	3rd	2nd	4th	435	Qualification to Grand Finals quarterfinal round
3	Meralco Bolts 3x3	2nd	5th	3rd	1st	6th	5th	395	Qualification to Grand Finals quarterfinal round
4	San Miguel Beermen	6th	1st	7th	4th	8th	1st	380	Qualification to Grand Finals quarterfinal round
5	Pioneer Pro Tibay	13th	4th	8th	7th	5th	2nd	277	Qualification to Grand Finals preliminary round
6	Barangay Ginebra San Miguel	3rd	2nd	9th	5th	13th	8th	267	Qualification to Grand Finals preliminary round
7	Platinum Karaoke	5th	7th	11th	6th	3rd	6th	266	Qualification to Grand Finals preliminary round
8	Purefoods TJ Titans	8th	8th	10th	9th	4th	3rd	238	Qualification to Grand Finals preliminary round
9	Sista Super Sealers	7th	10th	5th	11th	7th	11th	180	Qualification to Grand Finals preliminary round
10	Terrafirma 3x3	11th	12th	4th	10th	11th	13th	136	Qualification to Grand Finals preliminary round
11	Cavitex Braves	9th	11th	6th	12th	10th	9th	133	
12	Master Sardines Fishing Champs	12th	13th	12th	8th	9th	12th	109	
13	NorthPort Batang Pier	10th	9th	13th	13th	12th	10th	94	

Source: PBA 3x3

== Grand Finals ==
=== Preliminary round ===
==== Pool A ====
Pos	Team	Pld	W	L	PF	PA	PD	Qualification
1	Sista Super Sealers	2	2	0	39	36	+3	Quarterfinals
2	Pioneer Pro Tibay	2	1	1	38	35	+3	Quarterfinals
3	Purefoods TJ Titans	2	0	2	35	41	−6	

Source: PBA 3x3
Rules for classification: 1) Wins; Win ratio if unequal number of games; 2) Head-to-head record; 3) Average points per game; 4) Higher seed.

April 20, 2022
9:00 am

Report

Pioneer Pro Tibay	17–19	Sista Super Sealers

Smart Araneta Coliseum

April 20, 2022
9:50 am

Report

Purefoods TJ Titans	19–20	Sista Super Sealers

Smart Araneta Coliseum

April 20, 2022
10:40 am

Report

Pioneer Pro Tibay	21–16	Purefoods TJ Titans

Smart Araneta Coliseum

==== Pool B ====
Pos	Team	Pld	W	L	PF	PA	PD	Qualification
1	Barangay Ginebra San Miguel	2	2	0	44	37	+7	Quarterfinals
2	Terrafirma 3x3	2	1	1	39	41	−2	Quarterfinals
3	Platinum Karaoke	2	0	2	38	43	−5	

Source: PBA 3x3
Rules for classification: 1) Wins; Win ratio if unequal number of games; 2) Head-to-head record; 3) Average points per game; 4) Higher seed.

April 20, 2022
9:25 am

Report

Barangay Ginebra San Miguel	22–18	Terrafirma 3x3

Smart Araneta Coliseum

April 20, 2022
10:15 am

Report

Platinum Karaoke	19–21	Terrafirma 3x3

Smart Araneta Coliseum

The game between Barangay Ginebra San Miguel and Platinum Karaoke was initially delayed as smoke filled up the court. Players, coaches, and other personnel were evacuated from the court as firefighters responded to the scene. It was later determined to be caused by a fire breaking out in one area of the arena. The aforementioned game and the scheduled knockout stage games were subsequently postponed. The remaining games were rescheduled on April 27 at the Ynares Sports Arena.

April 27, 2022
3:00 pm

Report

Barangay Ginebra San Miguel	22–19	Platinum Karaoke

Ynares Sports Arena

=== Knockout stage ===
==== Bracket ====
Seed refers to the position of the team after six legs. Letter and number inside parentheses denotes the pool letter and pool position of the team, respectively, after the preliminary round of the Grand Finals.

Quarterfinals
1	Limitless Appmasters	14
5 (A2)	Pioneer Pro Tibay	16
6 (B1)	Barangay Ginebra San Miguel	21
4	San Miguel Beermen	12
3	Meralco Bolts 3x3	15
9 (A1)	Sista Super Sealers	16
10 (B2)	Terrafirma 3x3	17
2	TNT Tropang Giga	18

Semifinals
5 (A2)	Pioneer Pro Tibay	16
6 (B1)	Barangay Ginebra San Miguel	14
9 (A1)	Sista Super Sealers	13
2	TNT Tropang Giga	12

Finals
5 (A2)	Pioneer Pro Tibay	12
9 (A1)	Sista Super Sealers	10
Third place
6 (B1)	Barangay Ginebra San Miguel	21
2	TNT Tropang Giga	16

==== Quarterfinals ====
April 27, 2022
3:25 pm

Report

Limitless Appmasters	14–16	Pioneer Pro Tibay

Ynares Sports Arena

April 27, 2022
3:50 pm

Report

Barangay Ginebra San Miguel	21–12	San Miguel Beermen

Ynares Sports Arena

April 27, 2022
4:15 pm

Report

Meralco Bolts 3x3	15–16	Sista Super Sealers

Ynares Sports Arena

April 27, 2022
4:40 pm

Report

Terrafirma 3x3	17–18	TNT Tropang Giga

Ynares Sports Arena

==== Semifinals ====
April 27, 2022
5:05 pm

Report

Pioneer Pro Tibay	16–14	Barangay Ginebra San Miguel

Ynares Sports Arena

April 27, 2022
5:30 pm

Report

Sista Super Sealers	13–12	TNT Tropang Giga

Ynares Sports Arena

==== Third place game ====
April 27, 2022
6:05 pm

Report

Barangay Ginebra San Miguel	21–16	TNT Tropang Giga

Ynares Sports Arena

==== Finals ====
April 27, 2022
6:30 pm

Report

Pioneer Pro Tibay	12–10	Sista Super Sealers

Ynares Sports Arena
