= PBA 3x3 =

PBA men's 3x3 basketball league

- Organizing body: Philippine Basketball Association; Samahang Basketbol ng Pilipinas
- First season: 2021
- Folded: 2024
- Country: Philippines
- Confederation: FIBA Asia
- Number of teams: 11–14
- Last champions: Meralco Bolts 3x3
- Most championships: TNT Triple Giga (6 titles)
- Website: 3x3.pba.ph youtube.com/@PBAOfficial

PBA 3x3 was the men's 3x3 basketball league of the Philippine Basketball Association (PBA).

== History ==
The proposal to form PBA 3x3, a men's 3x3 basketball league, was a result of a joint partnership between the Philippine Basketball Association (PBA) and the Samahang Basketbol ng Pilipinas (SBP), the national sports association for basketball in the Philippines, as a means to help the Philippine national 3x3 team qualify for the 2024 Summer Olympics and subsequent editions after 3x3 became a regular discipline in the 2020 Summer Olympics. The concept for a PBA 3x3 league was proposed by Terrafirma governor Bobby Rosales in an annual board meeting. PBA 3x3 is proposed as a stand-alone program, similar to the PBA D-League which means that the 3x3 league is distinct from the main 5-a-side men's professional league of the PBA.

The PBA had prior involvement in 3x3. In 2014 and 2015, it has allowed some of its players to join Philippine-based teams to participate in masters tournaments of the FIBA 3x3 World Tour and organized the short-lived PBA Women's 3x3 which had one season in 2015, following the Philippines women's national team's promotion to Division I of the FIBA Asia Women's Championship.

The SBP also had partnered with Bounty Agro Ventures to organize the Chooks-to-Go Pilipinas 3x3, a men's 3x3 league, which helped garner enough FIBA 3x3 ranking points for the Philippine men's national team to earn a berth in the Olympic Qualifying Tournament for the 2020 Summer Olympics. Chooks-to-Go Pilipinas 3x3 has publicly welcomed the possible formation of a 3x3 league by the PBA and the SBP said that the existence of more competitive 3x3 tournaments is within its interest. There are plans to revive the women's 3x3 league as of February 2020.

The inaugural season was supposed to be held in 2020 but was postponed to 2021 due to the COVID-19 pandemic with the PBA preoccupied with plans to resume the season of its main league during that time.

The PBA 3x3 committee was formed in August 2020, with Alaska Aces governor, Richard Bachmann as its chairman. The committee held its first meeting on August 13, 2020. Eric Altamirano was also named as the league's first commissioner.

The PBA 3x3 inaugural season was initially scheduled to be held in parallel with the 2021 PBA season, which opened on April 11, 2021, but was further postponed. The inaugural PBA 3x3 season commenced on November 20, 2021.

Following the exodus of almost a third of players to the Maharlika Pilipinas Basketball League at the conclusion of the 2023–24 Third Conference, the PBA in May 2024 decided to shelf it's 3x3 league. With the disbandment of the Chooks-to-Go Pilipinas 3x3 in November 2023, the Philippines is left without a FIBA sanctioned men's 3x3 league.

== Format ==
The PBA 3x3 committee is leaning on scheduling games of the PBA 3x3 in between conferences of the main PBA league, to allow the franchise teams to field their top players in 3x3 matches.

Under FIBA 3x3 classification the league is a Level 4 tournament.

== Teams ==
=== Franchise teams ===
Among the franchise teams of the PBA since the 3x3 league's inception, only the Converge FiberXers (Alaska Aces in 2021 season) has not fielded a team. Phoenix Super LPG Fuel Masters and Rain or Shine Elasto Painters have fielded teams in the past but their respective teams would went on leave.

Team	Company	PBA affiliate	Joined
Barangay Ginebra San Miguel	Ginebra San Miguel, Inc.	Barangay Ginebra San Miguel	2021
Blackwater Smooth Razor	Ever Bilena	Blackwater Bossing	2022
Cavitex Braves	Metro Pacific Investments Corporation	NLEX Road Warriors	2021
Limitless Appmasters	Phoenix Petroleum Philippines, Inc.	Phoenix Super LPG Fuel Masters	2021
Meralco Bolts 3x3	Manila Electric Company	Meralco Bolts	2021
NorthPort Batang Pier	Sultan 900 Capital, Inc.	NorthPort Batang Pier	2021
Purefoods TJ Titans	San Miguel Food and Beverage, Inc.	Magnolia Hotshots	2021
San Miguel Beermen	San Miguel Brewery, Inc.	San Miguel Beermen	2021
Sista Super Sealers	Asian Coatings Philippines, Inc.	Rain or Shine Elasto Painters	2021
Terrafirma 3x3	Terrafirma Realty Development Corporation	Terrafirma Dyip	2021
TNT Triple Giga	Smart Communications	TNT Tropang Giga	2021

=== Guest teams ===
Team	Company	Joined
J&T Express	Jet Express Co., Ltd.	2022
Master Sardines Fishing Champs	Universal Canning Inc.	2021
MCFASolver Tech Centrale	MCFASolver Tech Centrale	2023
Pioneer ElastoSeal Katibays	Pioneer Epoxy Adhesives Inc.	2021
Platinum Karaoke	Vismay International Corporation	2021
Wilcon Depot 3x3	Wilcon Depot Inc.	2023
Zamboanga Valientes	MLV Group	2021

== Summary ==
Season	Conference	Final			Third place game		
Season	Conference	Grand Champion	Score	Runner-up	Third place	Score	Fourth place
2021	First	Limitless Appmasters	18–16	Platinum Karaoke	TNT Tropang Giga	22–14	Terrafirma 3x3
2021	Second	Pioneer Pro Tibay	12–10	Sista Super Sealers	Barangay Ginebra San Miguel	21–16	TNT Tropang Giga
2021	Third	TNT Tropang Giga	21–19	Purefoods TJ Titans	Sista Super Sealers	21–20	San Miguel Beermen
2022–23	First	TNT Tropang Giga	20–17	Platinum Karaoke	Cavitex Braves	16–11	Meralco Bolts 3x3
2022–23	Second	TNT Tropang Giga	19–17	Cavitex Braves	J&T Express	20–14	Platinum Karaoke
2022–23	Third	TNT Tropang Giga	21–18	San Miguel Beermen	Barangay Ginebra San Miguel	21–18	J&T Express
2023–24	First	TNT Triple Giga	21–18	Cavitex Braves	Meralco Bolts 3x3	18–14	Barangay Ginebra San Miguel
2023–24	Second	TNT Triple Giga	21–20	Meralco Bolts 3x3	Pioneer ElastoSeal Katibays	16–15	Cavitex Braves
2023–24	Third	Meralco Bolts 3x3	21–17	TNT Triple Giga	Cavitex Braves	22–19	Blackwater Smooth Razor

=== Championships by franchise ===
Franchise	Championships	Runners-up	Third places	Total trophies	Last championship
TNT Triple Giga	6	1	1	8	2023–24 Second
Meralco Bolts 3x3	1	1	1	3	2023–24 Third
Pioneer ElastoSeal Katibays	1	0	1	2	2021 Second
Limitless Appmasters	1	0	0	1	2021 First
Cavitex Braves	0	2	2	4	
Platinum Karaoke	0	2	0	2	
Sista Super Sealers	0	1	1	2	
Purefoods TJ Titans	0	1	0	1	
San Miguel Beermen	0	1	0	1	
Barangay Ginebra San Miguel	0	0	2	2	
J&T Express	0	0	1	1	
