= Master Sardines Fishing Champs =

- Leagues: PBA 3x3
- Founded: 2021
- History: 2022
- Team colors: Red, black, yellow, white
- Head coach: Hubert De Los Santos
- Ownership: Universal Canning Inc.

The Master Sardines Fishing Champs were a Philippine 3x3 basketball team which competes in the PBA 3x3, organized by the Philippines' top-flight professional league, Philippine Basketball Association (PBA).

== History ==
The Master Sardines Fishing Champs were a team sponsored by Universal Canning Inc. which formally expressed its intention to compete in the PBA 3x3 as early as March 2021. Universal Canning had previously fielded at least two teams in the traditional five-a-side game – Bacolod-Master Sardines and the Zamboanga Family's Brand Sardines in the Maharlika Pilipinas Basketball League.

However the team ultimately did not feature in the first conference of the inaugural 2021 season. The team joined the season's second conference. The team last played during the third conference as they did not return for the next season.

== Final roster ==
Master Sardines Fishing Champs roster
Players
Coaches

Pos.	No.	Nat.	Name	Ht.	Wt.	Age
		(Philippines)	Tabi, Cyrus
		(Philippines)	Mayabo, Ramon Alfredo
		(Philippines)	Sorela, Michole
		(Philippines)	Cormia, Jefferson
		(Philippines)	Hernandez, Levi
		(Philippines)	Malari, John

Head coach

Hubert De Los Santos

Legend

- (C) Team captain
- Injured

- Roster

=== Head coaches ===
Master Sardines Fishing Champs head coaches
Name	Start	End	Seasons	Overall record				Best finish
Name	Start	End	Seasons	W	L	PCT	G	Best finish
Victor Ycasiano	2022	2022	1	3	14	17%	17	
Hubert De Los Santos	2022	2022						
