= Sista Super Sealers =

- Leagues: PBA 3x3
- Founded: 2021
- Folded: 2022
- Team colors: Teal, gold, black, white
- Company: Asian Coatings Philippines, Inc.
- Head coach: Juven Formancil
- Ownership: Raymond Yu and Terry Que

The Sista Super Sealers were a Philippine 3x3 basketball team which competes in the PBA 3x3, organized by the Philippines' top-flight professional league, Philippine Basketball Association (PBA). The team was affiliated with the Rain or Shine Elasto Painters, a member franchise of the PBA.

== History ==
The Rain or Shine Elasto Painters are among the participating PBA franchise teams in the inaugural 2021 PBA 3x3 season. Instead of competing under the same name as their mother team, the 3x3 team competed under the name "Sista Super Sealers", named after Sista, Asian Coatings' sealant brand.

They would take a leave of absence in the 2022–23 season. The team would never play again in the league which disbanded in 2024.

== Final roster ==
Sista Super Sealers roster
Players
Coaches

Pos.	No.	Nat.	Name	Ht.	Wt.	Age
		(Philippines)	Manlangit, Joseph
		(Philippines)	De Vera, Leodaniel
		(Philippines)	Mocon, Kenneth
		(Philippines)	Jamon, Jan
		(Philippines)	Baltazar, Wilson
		(Philippines)	Gabawan, Jamil

Head coach

Juven Formancil

Legend

- (C) Team captain
- Injured

- Roster
