= Fairview Terraces =

Shopping mall in Quezon City, Philippines

Ayala Malls Fairview Terraces

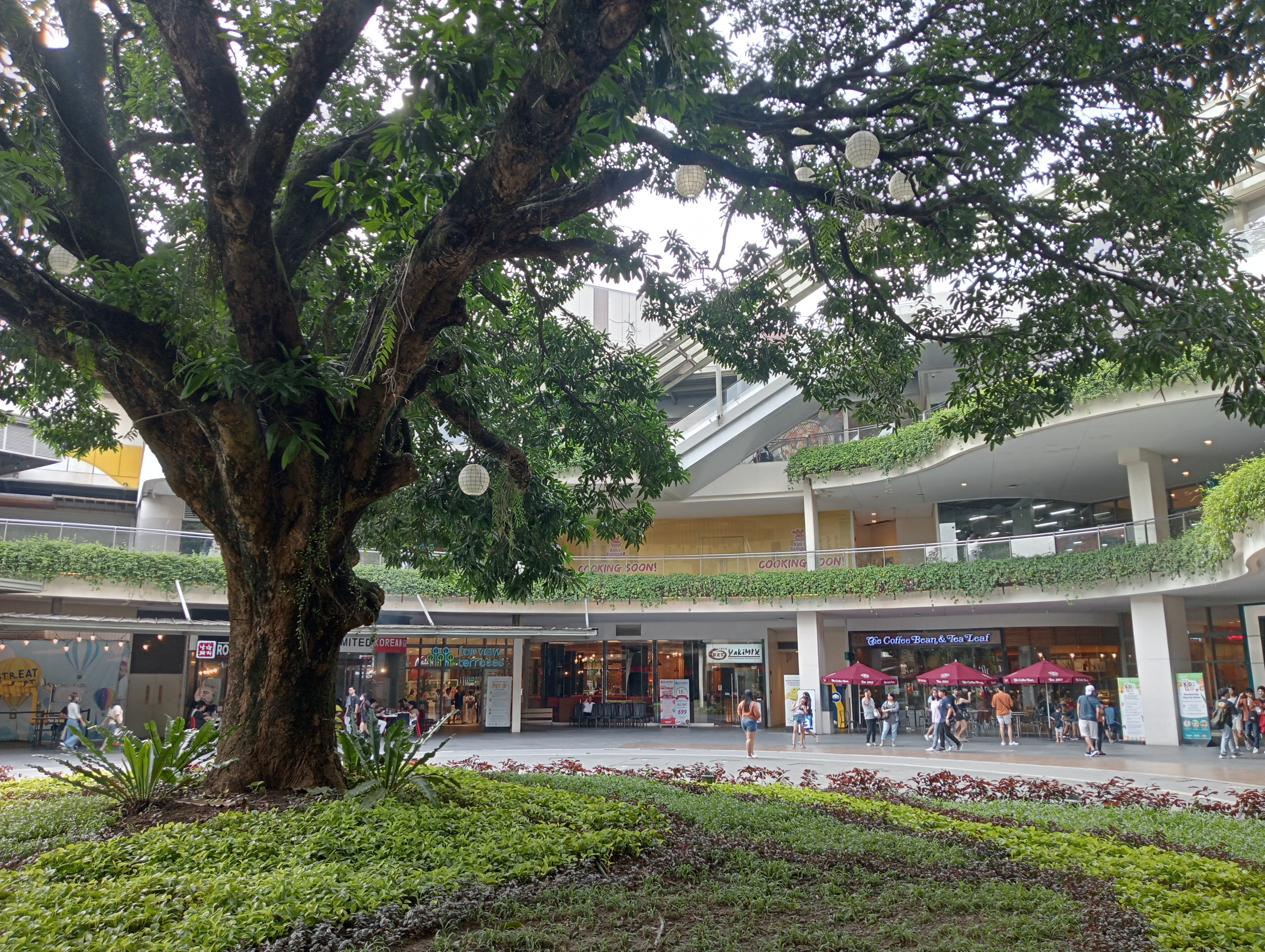
- Inside the mall, September 2023
- Location: Quezon City, Metro Manila, Philippines
- Coordinates: 14°44′12″N 121°03′36″E
- Address: Quirino Highway corner Maligaya Drive, Pasong Putik, Quezon City
- Opened: February 28, 2014; 12 years ago
- Developer: Ayala Land
- Manager: Ayala Malls
- Owner: Ayala Corporation
- Architect: Benoy
- Num. of stores: 420 shops
- Floor area: 135,000 square metres (1,450,000 sq ft)
- Floors: 5
- Parking: 1,500
- Public transit: 6 17 39 41 49 SM City Fairview; 7 36 37 38 40 Robinsons Novaliches; Future: Mindanao Avenue

Ayala Malls Fairview Terraces, also known as Fairview Terraces, is a shopping mall in Quezon City, Philippines, owned by the Ayala Malls group. This mall has average of roughly 13,600 visitors per day. It opened on February 28, 2014, and has a gross floor area of 135,000 m^{2} (1,450,000 sq ft), making it the third largest Ayala Malls in Quezon City after TriNoma and U.P. Town Center.

== Features ==
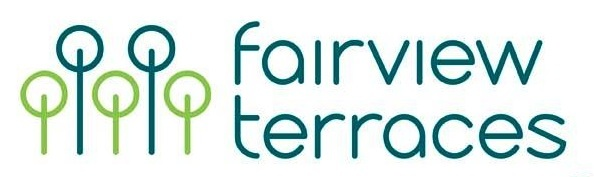
Logo from 2014 to 2026

The mall has five levels, with one minor ones at the roof deck with some retail stores. This mall features central garden and is characterized of Alfresco areas similar to Trinoma. The central garden has water features ground fountain. Roughly 30 percent of the land is designated for open spaces that also host variety of international restaurants and several coffee shops. It has six digital cinemas located at the uppermost floor that is equipped with reclining seats.

It houses also several fast food chain restaurants. The mall compose of four atriums, the largest one at the activity center, one near the Puregold wing and two at the east wing. It is home to the fine dining restaurants offering different cuisines.

As of 2023, it also features the biggest Timezone in the Philippines spanning at 2,800 square meters (30,000 sq ft). It has several arcade selections, music zone, six-lane bowling alley, claw machine, and racing games. It also offers immersive modernized VR zone.

== See also ==
- Trinoma
- Glorietta
- SM City Fairview
