= Terrafirma 3x3 =

Philippine 3x3 basketball team

- Leagues: PBA 3x3
- Founded: 2021
- Folded: 2024
- Team colors: Green, navy blue, white
- Company: Terrafirma Realty Development Corporation
- Ownership: Jose Alvarez

The Terrafirma 3x3 was a Philippine 3x3 basketball team which competed in the PBA 3x3, organized by the Philippines' top-flight professional league, Philippine Basketball Association (PBA). The team is affiliated with the Terrafirma Dyip, a member franchise of the PBA.

== History ==
The Terrafirma Dyip, competing as Terrafirma 3x3, are among the participating PBA franchise teams in the inaugural 2021 PBA 3x3 season.

Following the shelving of the PBA 3x3 after the conclusion of the 2023–24 season, the team would be disbanded.

== Head coaches ==
Terrafima 3x3 head coaches
Name	Start	End	Seasons	Overall record				Best finish
Name	Start	End	Seasons	W	L	PCT	G	Best finish
Raymond Tiongco	2021	2022	1	28	22	56%	50	Quarterfinals
Joe Lipa	2022	?	1					
Raymond Tiongco	2023	2024	1					
