= Pioneer ElastoSeal Katibays =

- Leagues: PBA 3x3
- Founded: 2021
- Folded: 2024
- History: Pioneer Pro Tibay (2021–2022); Pioneer ElastoSeal Katibays (2022–2024)
- Team colors: Grey, White, Red
- Company: Pioneer Epoxy Adhesives Inc.
- Head coach: Lester Del Rosario
- Championships: 1 championship 2021 Second conference

Pioneer ElastoSeal Katibays was a Philippine 3x3 basketball team which competes in the PBA 3x3, organized by the Philippines' top-flight professional league, Philippine Basketball Association.

== History ==
Pioneer Epoxy Adhesives entered the PBA 3x3 in 2021, fielding the Pioneer Pro Tibay as a guest team. They were forced to forfeit two games in the opening day of the first leg of the inaugural 2021 PBA 3x3 season due to inability to secure a medical clearance from the Games and Amusements Board. They were able to do so the following day and remained in contention. For the 2022–23 season the team was renamed as the Pioneer ElastoSeal Katibays.

== Final roster ==
Pioneer Pro Tibay roster
Players
Coaches

Pos.	No.	Nat.	Name	Ht.	Wt.	Age
		(Philippines)	Abrigo, Gian
		(Philippines)	Gabriel, Jon Jon
		(Philippines)	Doliguez, Clint
		(Philippines)	Morido, Reggie
		(Philippines)	Villamor, Dennice
		(Philippines)	Ugsang, Reeve
		(Philippines)	Mocon, Kenneth

Head coach

Lester Del Rosario

Legend

- (C) Team captain
- Injured

- Roster
