= Purefoods TJ Titans =

Purefoods Tender Juicy Titans
- Leagues: PBA 3x3
- Founded: 2021
- Folded: 2024
- Location: Philippines
- Team colors: Red, blue, white
- Company: San Miguel Food and Beverage, Inc.
- Ownership: Ramon S. Ang

The Purefoods Tender Juicy Titans, also known as the Purefoods TJ Titans, was a Philippine 3x3 basketball team which competed in the PBA 3x3, organized by the Philippines' top-flight professional league, Philippine Basketball Association (PBA). The team is affiliated with the Magnolia Hotshots, a member franchise of the PBA.

== History ==
The Magnolia Hotshots are among the participating PBA franchise teams in the inaugural 2021 PBA 3x3 season. Instead of competing under the same name as their mother team, the 3x3 team competed under the name "Purefoods Tender Juicy Titans". The Purefoods Tender Juicy name was previously used by the mother team from 1991–92, 1993, 1994–1996 and 1998–2005 as the "Purefoods Tender Juicy Hotdogs" and from 2007–2010 as the "Purefoods Tender Juicy Giants".

Following the shelving of the PBA 3x3 after the conclusion of the 2023–24 season, the team would be disbanded.
