= San Miguel Beermen (3x3 team) =

- Leagues: PBA 3x3
- Founded: 2021
- Folded: 2024
- Team colors: Red, black, white
- Company: San Miguel Brewery
- Ownership: Ramon S. Ang

The San Miguel Beermen were a Philippine 3x3 basketball team which competed in the PBA 3x3, organized by the Philippines' top-flight professional league, Philippine Basketball Association (PBA). The team is affiliated with a PBA member franchise of the same name.

== History ==
The San Miguel Beermen are among the participating PBA franchise teams in the inaugural 2021 PBA 3x3 season.

Following the shelving of the PBA 3x3 after the conclusion of the 2023–24 season, the team would be disbanded.
