= List of 2023–24 PBA season transactions =

This is a list of transactions that have taken place during the off-season and the 2023–24 PBA season.

== Retirement ==
Date	Name	Team(s) played (years)	Age	Notes	Ref.
May 12	Reynel Hugnatan	Coca-Cola Tigers (2003–2005); Alaska Aces (2005–2011); Meralco Bolts (2011–2023)	44	Hugnatan became an assistant coach for the Meralco Bolts.	

== Coaching changes ==
=== Off-season ===
Departure date	Team	Outgoing head coach	Reason for departure	Hire date	Incoming head coach	Last coaching position	Ref.
April 2	Blackwater Bossing	Ariel Vanguardia (interim)	Released	April 13	Jeffrey Cariaso	Converge FiberXers head coach (2022)	
May 8	Meralco Bolts	Norman Black	Demoted to team consultant	May 8	Luigi Trillo	Meralco Bolts assistant coach (2014–2023)	
October 2	Phoenix Super LPG Fuel Masters	Jamike Jarin (interim)	Promoted to full-time role	October 2	Jamike Jarin	Phoenix Super LPG Fuel Masters interim head coach (2023)	
January 20	TNT Tropang Giga	Jojo Lastimosa	Reverted to full-time team manager role	January 20	Chot Reyes	Philippines men's national basketball team head coach (2022–2023)	

== Player movements ==
=== Trades ===
April
April 14	To Converge FiberXers: Adrian Wong; 2023 (S48) Magnolia first-round pick (No. 10)	To Magnolia Chicken Timplados Hotshots: David Murrell; Abu Tratter
May
May 8	To Converge FiberXers: Mike Nieto	To Rain or Shine Elasto Painters: 2024 (S49) Converge second-round pick; 2025 (S50) Converge second-round pick
May 18	To Meralco Bolts: Norbert Torres	To Rain or Shine Elasto Painters: Mac Belo
May 30	To NLEX Road Warriors: Ben Adamos	To Phoenix Super LPG Fuel Masters: Reden Celda; Tzaddy Rangel
September
September 21	To Rain or Shine Elasto Painters: Dave Marcelo; 2025 (S50) TNT first-round pick	To TNT Tropang Giga: Henry Galinato; Jewel Ponferada
December
December 11	Three-team trade	
December 11	To NLEX Road Warriors: Robert Bolick (from NorthPort); Kent Salado (from NorthPort)	To NorthPort Batang Pier: Ben Adamos (from NLEX); Kris Rosales (from NLEX); Allyn Bulanadi (from San Miguel); Jeepy Faundo (from San Miguel); 2024 (S49) Blackwater second-round pick (from NLEX); 2027 (S51) San Miguel second-round pick (from NorthPort)
December 11	To San Miguel Beermen: Don Trollano (from NLEX)	
February
February 14	To Blackwater Bossing: Rey Nambatac	To Rain or Shine Elasto Painters: 2024 (S49) TNT first-round pick; 2025 (S50) TNT second-round pick
February 26	Three-team trade	
February 26	To Blackwater Bossing: Justin Chua (from TNT); Jaydee Tungcab (from TNT); 2027 (S51) TNT first-round pick	To NLEX Road Warriors: Yousef Taha (from Blackwater); Ato Ular (from Blackwater); 2027 (S51) Blackwater first-round pick
February 26	To TNT Tropang Giga: Brandon Ganuelas-Rosser (from NLEX)	
April
April 11	To Converge FiberXers: 2024 (S49) Magnolia second-round pick	To Magnolia Chicken Timplados Hotshots: Jerrick Balanza

=== Free agents ===
Player	Date signed	Contract amount	Contract length	New team	Former team	Ref
RR Garcia	April 5	Not disclosed	1 year	Phoenix Super LPG Fuel Masters		
Larry Muyang	April 5	Not disclosed	2 years	Phoenix Super LPG Fuel Masters		
Kevin Racal	April 18	Not disclosed	2 years	Converge FiberXers		
Nick Demusis	April 28	Not disclosed	2 years	Rain or Shine Elasto Painters		
Mark Borboran	April 28	Not disclosed	2 years	Rain or Shine Elasto Painters		
Jayson David	May 12	Not disclosed	1 year	Barangay Ginebra San Miguel		
Allen Mina	May 12	Not disclosed	1 year	Terrafirma Dyip		
Dave Marcelo	May 16	Not disclosed	1 year	TNT Tropang Giga		
Carl Bryan Cruz	May 16	Not disclosed	1 year	TNT Tropang Giga		
Chris Lalata	May 23	Not disclosed	1 year	Phoenix Super LPG Fuel Masters		
Jerrick Balanza	May 30	Not disclosed	2 years	Converge FiberXers		
Jerrick Ahanmisi	May 30	Not disclosed	2 years	Magnolia Chicken Timplados Hotshots		
Mac Belo	May 31	₱300,000 per month	1 year	Rain or Shine Elasto Painters		
Aljun Melecio	June 2	Not disclosed	Not disclosed	Converge FiberXers		
Keith Zaldivar	June 9	Not disclosed	Not disclosed	Converge FiberXers	Magnolia Chicken Timplados Hotshots	
Roger Pogoy	June 26	Not disclosed	3 years	TNT Tropang Giga		
Rey Nambatac	June 27	₱420,000 per month (max. contract)	2 years (Note: Extension to take effect in 2024)	Rain or Shine Elasto Painters		
Mike Nieto	June 28	Not disclosed	2 years	Converge FiberXers		
Tyler Tio	July 3	Not disclosed	3 years	Phoenix Super LPG Fuel Masters		
William Navarro	July 6	Not disclosed	2 years	NorthPort Batang Pier		
Robbie Herndon	July 11	Not disclosed	2 years	NLEX Road Warriors	San Miguel Beermen	
Nonoy Baclao	July 17	Not disclosed	Not disclosed	San Miguel Beermen	Meralco Bolts	
Andrei Caracut	August 29	Not disclosed	2 years	Rain or Shine Elasto Painters		
Kevin Alas	September 14	Not disclosed	3 years	NLEX Road Warriors		
Maverick Ahanmisi	September 18	₱420,000 per month (max. contract)	3 years	Barangay Ginebra San Miguel	Converge FiberXers	
Terrence Romeo	September 20	Not disclosed	2 years	San Miguel Beermen		
James Yap	September 26	Not disclosed	1 conference	Rain or Shine Elasto Painters		
Glenn Khobuntin	October 2	Not disclosed	3 years	TNT Tropang Giga		
Jamie Malonzo	October 9	Not disclosed	2 years	Barangay Ginebra San Miguel		
Dave Marcelo	October 11	Not disclosed	Not disclosed	NLEX Road Warriors	Rain or Shine Elasto Painters	
Jeron Teng	October 18	Not disclosed	2 years	San Miguel Beermen	Converge FiberXers	
Mac Tallo	October 21	₱300,000 per month	2 years	Converge FiberXers	Chooks-to-Go 3x3	
Bradwyn Guinto	November 4	Not disclosed	1 conference	Blackwater Bossing	Converge FiberXers	
Mike Tolomia	November 10	Not disclosed	1 conference	TNT Tropang Giga	Zamboanga Valientes (Pilipinas VisMin Super Cup)	
Beau Belga	December 14	Not disclosed	1 year	Rain or Shine Elasto Painters		
Jjay Alejandro	December 16	Not disclosed	2 years	Phoenix Super LPG Fuel Masters		
Robert Bolick	December 17	Not disclosed	3 years	NLEX Road Warriors	Fukushima Firebonds (B2 League)	
Jason Perkins	December 19	₱420,000 per month (max. contract)	3 years	Phoenix Super LPG Fuel Masters		
Calvin Abueva	December 20	Not disclosed	3 years	Magnolia Chicken Timplados Hotshots		
Baser Amer	December 31	Not disclosed	Rest of the conference	Blackwater Bossing		
Dave Marcelo	January 3	Not disclosed	1 year	NLEX Road Warriors		
Leonard Santillan	January 24	Not disclosed	3 years	Rain or Shine Elasto Painters		
Anton Asistio	January 24	Not disclosed	2 years	Rain or Shine Elasto Painters		
Rey Suerte	January 25	Not disclosed	2 years	Blackwater Bossing		
Kevin Ferrer	February 1	Not disclosed	1 year	Terrafirma Dyip		
Russel Escoto	February 4	Not disclosed	1 year	Magnolia Chicken Timplados Hotshots		
Isaac Go	February 7	Not disclosed	1 year	Terrafirma Dyip		
Andreas Cahilig	February 7	Not disclosed	2 years	Terrafirma Dyip		
James Yap	February 9	Not disclosed	1 year	Blackwater Bossing	Rain or Shine Elasto Painters	
Baser Amer	February 13	Not disclosed	Not disclosed	NLEX Road Warriors	Blackwater Bossing	
Barkley Eboña	February 19	Not disclosed	1 year	TNT Tropang Giga	Converge FiberXers	
Kim Aurin	February 20	Not disclosed	2 years	TNT Tropang Giga		
Richard Escoto	February 27	Not disclosed	1 year	Blackwater Bossing		
RR Garcia	March 5	Not disclosed	1 year	Phoenix Super LPG Fuel Masters		
RJ Jazul	March 6	Not disclosed	1 year	Phoenix Super LPG Fuel Masters		
Aris Dionisio	March 12	Not disclosed	3 years	Magnolia Chicken Timplados Hotshots		
Justin Arana	March 16	₱420,000 per month (max. contract)	3 years	Converge FiberXers		
Alec Stockton	March 16	₱420,000 per month (max. contract)	3 years	Converge FiberXers		
Kent Salado	March 16	Not disclosed	Not disclosed	Phoenix Fuel Masters	NLEX Road Warriors	
Philip Paredes	March 21	Not disclosed	1 conference	Rain or Shine Elasto Painters	NLEX Road Warriors	
David Murrell	April 25	Not disclosed	Not disclosed	Barangay Ginebra San Miguel	Magnolia Chicken Timplados Hotshots	
Shaun Ildefonso	April 29	Not disclosed	2 years	Rain or Shine Elasto Painters		
Jhonard Clarito	April 29	Not disclosed	2 years	Rain or Shine Elasto Painters		
Player	Date signed	Contract amount	Contract length	New team	Former team	Ref

=== 3x3 ===
Player	Date	Movement	Mother team	3x3 team	Ref
Joseph Eriobu	August 22	Promoted to mother team	Magnolia Chicken Timplados Hotshots	Purefoods TJ Titans	
Lervin Flores	October 11	Promoted to mother team	TNT Tropang Giga	TNT Triple Giga	
Donald Gumaru	October 15	Promoted to mother team	Barangay Ginebra San Miguel	Barangay Ginebra San Miguel	
Jorey Napoles	April 13	Promoted to mother team	NLEX Road Warriors	Cavitex Braves	

=== Going to other Philippine leagues ===
Player	Date signed	New team	New league	Former PBA team	Ref.
Joseph Gabayni	April 14	Bulacan Kuyas	MPBL	Terrafirma Dyip	
Encho Serrano	May 23	Pampanga Giant Lanterns	MPBL	Phoenix Super LPG Fuel Masters	
Kurt Lojera	June 6	Siomai King	PSL	Phoenix Super LPG Fuel Masters	
Roi Sumang	June 7	Nueva Ecija Rice Vanguards	MPBL	NorthPort Batang Pier	
Arwind Santos	October 6	Pampanga Giant Lanterns	MPBL	NorthPort Batang Pier	
Gab Banal	February 1	Quezon Huskers	MPBL	Blackwater Bossing	
Carl Bryan Cruz	March 6	Manila Stars	MPBL	TNT Tropang Giga	

=== Going abroad ===
Player	Date signed	New team	New country	Former PBA team	Ref
Robert Bolick	May 15	Fukushima Firebonds	Japan	NorthPort Batang Pier	
Joshua Torralba	July 24	Goyang Sono Skygunners	South Korea	Blackwater Bossing	
Alex Cabagnot	December 18	Goyang Sono Skygunners	South Korea	Terrafirma Dyip	

== 2023 PBA draft ==
The PBA season 48 draft was held on September 17, 2023, at Market! Market! in Taguig. A total of 79 amateur players were selected in 11 rounds of draft.

Round	Pick	Player	Date signed	Contract length	Team (Note: Team denotes the team that holds the players' draft rights at the time of contract signing. Teams in parentheses denotes the teams that drafted the players before any trade or free agent signing occurred)	Ref
1	1	Stephen Holt	October 4	2 years	Terrafirma Dyip	
1	2	Christian David	September 25	2 years	Blackwater Bossing	
1	3	Luis Villegas	September 20	3 years	Rain or Shine Elasto Painters	
1	4	Keith Datu	September 20	3 years	Rain or Shine Elasto Painters	
1	5	Zavier Lucero	October 3	2 years	NorthPort Batang Pier	
1	6	Kenneth Tuffin	October 2	3 years	Phoenix Super LPG Fuel Masters	
1	7	Richie Rodger	October 18	Not disclosed	NLEX Road Warriors	
1	8	Brandon Bates	October 18	2 years	Meralco Bolts	
1	9	Schonny Winston	October 1	2 years	Converge FiberXers	
1	10	BJ Andrade	September 23	2 years	Converge FiberXers	
1	11	Cade Flores	September 26	2 years	NorthPort Batang Pier	
1	12	Taylor Miller	September 26	2 years	Terrafirma Dyip	
2	13	Kemark Cariño	September 28	2 years	Terrafirma Dyip	
2	14	Bryan Santos	September 25	2 years	Converge FiberXers	
2	15	Henry Galinato	September 23	2 years	TNT Tropang Giga (rights acquired from Rain or Shine)	
2	16	Raffy Verano	October 2	2 years	Phoenix Super LPG Fuel Masters	
2	17	Ricci Rivero	October 2	2 years	Phoenix Super LPG Fuel Masters	
2	18	Enoch Valdez	December 2	2 years	NLEX Road Warriors	
2	19	JL delos Santos	December 4	Not disclosed	Converge FiberXers	
2	20	James Kwekuteye	December 5	2 years	Blackwater Bossing	
2	21	Jhan Nermal	December 5	2 years	NLEX Road Warriors	
2	22	Louie Sangalang	December 19	Not disclosed	Terrafirma Dyip	
2	23	Ralph Cu	September 27	1 year	Barangay Ginebra San Miguel	
2	24	Adrian Nocum	November 27	2 years	Rain or Shine Elasto Painters	
3	26	Clifford Jopia	December 19	2 years	Blackwater Bossing	
3	27	Sherwin Concepcion	October 2	1 year	Rain or Shine Elasto Painters	
3	28	Matthew Daves	October 2	1 year	Phoenix Super LPG Fuel Masters	
3	29	Brent Paraiso	September 26	2 years	NorthPort Batang Pier	
3	30	Dominick Fajardo	October 18	Not disclosed	NLEX Road Warriors	
3	31	Inand Fornilos	October 2	Not disclosed	Converge FiberXers	
3	33	Patrick Maagdenberg	September 23	2 years	Converge FiberXers (drafted by Magnolia but left unsigned)	
3	34	Kim Aurin	October 6	Not disclosed	TNT Tropang Giga (drafted by Barangay Ginebra but left unsigned)	
3	35	Troy Mallillin	September 27	2 years	San Miguel Beermen	
4	36	Tommy Olivario	September 28	1 year	Terrafirma Dyip	
4	37	Archie Concepcion	December 14	2 years	Blackwater Bossing	
4	40	Fran Yu	September 26	2 years	NorthPort Batang Pier	
4	42	King Caralipio	November 13	Not disclosed	Converge FiberXers	
5	51	John Amores	October 31	1 year	NorthPort Batang Pier	
6	61	Kamron Vigan-Fleming	September 23	2 years	Converge FiberXers	
9	76	Kyt Jimenez	September 27	2 years	San Miguel Beermen	
