= Converge FiberXers all-time roster =

The following is a list of players, both past and current, who have appeared at least in one game for the Converge FiberXers PBA franchise.

== A ==
Name	Position	School/University	Nickname	Years with Converge		No. of seasons	Ref.
Name	Position	School/University	Nickname	From	To	No. of seasons	Ref.
Ben Adamos	Center / Power forward	Perpetual		2022		1	
Maverick Ahanmisi	Point guard / Shooting guard	Minnesota	Mav	2022	2023	1	
Jeo Ambohot	Center / Power forward	Letran		2022	present		
BJ Andrade	Shooting guard / Small forward	Ateneo		2024	2025	2	
Justin Arana	Center	Arellano		2022	present		

== B ==
Name	Position	School/University	Nickname	Years with Converge		No. of seasons	Ref.
Name	Position	School/University	Nickname	From	To	No. of seasons	Ref.
Jerrick Balanza	Shooting guard	Letran		2023	2024	1	
Justine Baltazar	Power forward / Center	De La Salle	Balti	2024	present		
Taylor Browne	Shooting guard / Small forward	UBC		2022	2023	1	
Allyn Bulanadi	Shooting guard	San Sebastian		2022		1	

== C ==
Name	Position	School/University	Nickname	Years with Converge		No. of seasons	Ref.
Name	Position	School/University	Nickname	From	To	No. of seasons	Ref.
Alex Cabagnot	Point guard	Hawaii-Hilo	The Crunchman	2024	2025		
King Caralipio	Small forward	Letran		2023	present		
Jackson Corpuz	Power forward	PCU		2025	present		

== D ==
Name	Position	School/University	Nickname	Years with Converge		No. of seasons	Ref.
Name	Position	School/University	Nickname	From	To	No. of seasons	Ref.
JL delos Santos	Point guard	JRU		2023	present		
Cheick Diallo (Import)	Center / Shooting guard	Kansas		2024	2025	1	
Michael DiGregorio	Shooting guard	McKendree		2022		1	

== E ==
Name	Position	School/University	Nickname	Years with Converge		No. of seasons	Ref.
Name	Position	School/University	Nickname	From	To	No. of seasons	Ref.
Barkley Eboña	Center / Power forward	FEU		2023		1	

== F ==
Name	Position	School/University	Nickname	Years with Converge		No. of seasons	Ref.			
Name	Position	School/University	Nickname	Andre Flores	Small forward / Power forward	No. of seasons	Ref.	Ateneo	2024	1
Inand Fornilos	Small forward / Power forward	Ateneo		2023	present					
Jamaal Franklin (Import)	Small forward / Shooting guard	San Diego State		2023		1				

== G ==
Name	Position	School/University	Nickname	Years with Converge		No. of seasons	Ref.			
Name	Position	School/University	Nickname	MJ Garcia	Point guard / Shooting guard	No. of seasons	Ref.	SPCF	2025	present
Bradwyn Guinto	Center / Power forward	San Sebastian		2023		1				

== H ==
Name	Position	School/University	Nickname	Years with Converge		No. of seasons	Ref.				
Name	Position	School/University	Nickname	Jordan Heading	Shooting guard / Point guard	No. of seasons	Ref.	California Baptist	2024	2025	1
Scotty Hopson (Import)	Small forward / Power forward	Tennessee		2024		1					
Tyrus Hill	Power forward / Small forward	Adamson		2022		1					

== I ==
Name	Position	School/University	Nickname	Years with Converge		No. of seasons	Ref.			
Name	Position	School/University	Nickname	RK Ilagan	Point guard	No. of seasons	Ref.	San Sebastian	2022	1
Danny Ildefonso	Power forward / Center	NU	The Demolition Man	2023		1				

== J ==
Name	Position	School/University	Nickname	Years with Converge		No. of seasons	Ref.			
Name	Position	School/University	Nickname	Paolo Javillonar	Power forward / Center	No. of seasons	Ref.	Letran	2024	present
Jalen Jones (Import)	Power forward	Texas A&M		2024		1				

== L ==
Name	Position	School/University	Nickname	Years with Converge		No. of seasons	Ref.			
Name	Position	School/University	Nickname	Kurt Lojera	Shooting guard	No. of seasons	Ref.	De La Salle	2022	1

== M ==
Name	Position	School/University	Nickname	Years with Converge		No. of seasons	Ref.			
Name	Position	School/University	Nickname	Patrick Maagdenberg	Center / Power forward	No. of seasons	Ref.	Ateneo	2023	present
Aljun Melecio	Point guard	De La Salle		2023	2024					
Quincy Miller (Import)	Power forward	Baylor		2022		1				
David Murrell	Small forward	UP		2022	2023	1				

== N ==
Name	Position	School/University	Nickname	Years with Converge		No. of seasons	Ref.			
Name	Position	School/University	Nickname	Jhan Nermal	Small forward	No. of seasons	Ref.	STI WNU	2025	present
Mike Nieto	Small forward	Ateneo	Big Mike	2023	2025	2				

== R ==
Name	Position	School/University	Nickname	Years with Converge		No. of seasons	Ref.
Name	Position	School/University	Nickname	From	To	No. of seasons	Ref.
Kevin Racal	Small forward	Letran	K-Racs	2022	present		
Ethan Rusbatch (Import)	Small forward	Lincoln Trail		2023		1	

== S ==
Name	Position	School/University	Nickname	Years with Converge		No. of seasons	Ref.
Name	Position	School/University	Nickname	From	To	No. of seasons	Ref.
Bryan Santos	Power forward	UST		2023	present		
Ronan Santos	Center / Power forward	Arellano		2025	present		
Alec Stockton	Shooting guard / Point guard	FEU		2022	present		
Rey Suerte	Shooting guard / Small forward	UE		2025	present		

== T ==
Name	Position	School/University	Nickname	Years with Converge		No. of seasons	Ref.			
Name	Position	School/University	Nickname	Mac Tallo	Point guard / Shooting guard	No. of seasons	Ref.	Southwestern	2023	1
Jeron Teng	Small forward / Shooting guard	De La Salle		2022	2023	1				
Mike Tolomia	Point guard / Shooting guard	FEU		2022	2023	1				
Abu Tratter	Center / Power forward	De La Salle		2022	2023	1				

== V ==
Name	Position	School/University	Nickname	Years with Converge		No. of seasons	Ref.			
Name	Position	School/University	Nickname	Kamron Vigan-Fleming	Small forward	No. of seasons	Ref.	Bethesda	2023	present
Tom Vodanovich (Import)	Power forward	James Madison		2023		2				

== W ==
Name	Position	School/University	Nickname	Years with Converge		No. of seasons	Ref.				
Name	Position	School/University	Nickname	Jamil Wilson (Import)	Power forward	No. of seasons	Ref.	Marquette	2023	2024	1
Schonny Winston	Shooting guard / Small forward	De La Salle		2023	present						

== Z ==
Name	Position	School/University	Nickname	Years with Converge		No. of seasons	Ref.			
Name	Position	School/University	Nickname	Keith Zaldivar	Center	No. of seasons	Ref.	Adamson	2023	1
