= PBA season 48 draft =

Player selection in Philippine basketball

General information
- Date: September 17, 2023
- Location: Market! Market!
- Networks: One Sports (One Sports, PBA Rush)

Overview
- League: Philippine Basketball Association
- First selection: Stephen Holt (Terrafirma Dyip)

The PBA season 48 draft was the 38th edition of the PBA draft. It was held at Market! Market! in Taguig on September 17, 2023. It was an event that allowed teams to take turns selecting amateur basketball players and other eligible players, including half-Filipino foreign players. The league determined the drafting order based on the performance of the member teams from the 2022–23 season, with the worst team, the Terrafirma Dyip, picking first. For the first time since 2010, the draft was held at Market! Market!.

== Draft order ==
The draft order was determined based on the overall performance of the teams from the previous season. The Philippine Cup final ranking comprises 40% of the points, while the rankings of the Commissioner's and Governors' Cups are 30% each.

Draft order	Team	Final ranking			Total
Draft order	Team	PHI	COM	GOV	Total
1st	Terrafirma Dyip	12th	12th	11th	11.7
2nd	Blackwater Bossing	8th	11th	12th	10.1
3rd	Rain or Shine Elasto Painters	9th	7th	10th	8.7
4th	Phoenix Super LPG Fuel Masters	11th	6th	8th	8.6
5th	NorthPort Batang Pier	10th	5th	9th	8.2
6th	NLEX Road Warriors	6th	8th	6th	6.6
7th	Converge FiberXers	7th	4th	7th	6.1
8th	Meralco Bolts	4th	9th	4th	5.5
9th	TNT Tropang Giga	2nd	10th	1st	4.1
10th	Magnolia Chicken Timplados Hotshots	3rd	2nd	5th	3.3
11th	Barangay Ginebra San Miguel	5th	1st	2nd	2.9
12th	San Miguel Beermen	1st	3rd	3rd	2.2

== Draft selections ==
PG	Point guard	SG	Shooting guard	SF	Small forward	PF	Power forward	C	Center	*	Mythical Team Member	^{#}	All-Star

=== 1st round ===
Pick	Player	Pos.	Country of birth	Team	School / club team
1	Stephen Holt^{#}	SG/SF	United States	Terrafirma Dyip	Saint Mary's / CSM Oradea (Romania)
2	Christian David	PF/SF	Canada	Blackwater Bossing	Butler
3	Luis Villegas	C	United States	Rain or Shine Elasto Painters	UE
4	Keith Datu	C	United States	Rain or Shine Elasto Painters (from Phoenix) (Note: June 7, 2022: Phoenix Super LPG to Rain or Shine: Rain or Shine acquired Nick Demusis, a 2022 first-round pick, and a 2023 second-round pick; Phoenix Super LPG acquired Javee Mocon)	Chico State
5	Zavier Lucero	PF	United States	NorthPort Batang Pier	UP Diliman
6	Kenneth Tuffin	SF/SG	New Zealand	Phoenix Super LPG Fuel Masters (from NLEX) (Note: February 24, 2022: NLEX to Phoenix Super LPG: Phoenix Super LPG acquired Kris Porter, a 2021 second-round pick, and a 2022 first-round pick; NLEX acquired Justin Chua)	FEU / Wellington Saints (New Zealand)
7	Richie Rodger	SG/SF	New Zealand	NLEX Road Warriors (from Converge) (Note: May 17, 2022: Converge to NLEX: NLEX acquired a 2022 first-round pick; Converge acquired Tyrus Hill and David Murrell)	UE
8	Brandon Bates^{#}	C	Australia	Meralco Bolts	De La Salle
9	Schonny Winston	SG/SF	United States	Converge FiberXers (from TNT via Blackwater) (Note: February 28, 2020: TNT to Blackwater (three-team trade with NLEX): Blackwater acquired Marion Magat, Yousef Taha, Ed Daquioag, 2021 and 2022 first-round picks (from TNT); TNT acquired Poy Erram; NLEX acquired Anthony Semerad, Rabeh Al-Hussaini, a 2020 first-round pick (from Blackwater), and a 2021 second-round pick (from San Miguel via Blackwater); January 3, 2023: Blackwater to Converge: Converge acquired Barkley Eboña and TNT's 2022 first-round pick; Blackwater acquired Michael DiGregorio, Tyrus Hill, and RK Ilagan)	De La Salle
10	BJ Andrade	SG/SF	Hong Kong	Converge FiberXers (from Magnolia) (Note: April 14, 2023: Magnolia to Converge: Converge acquired Adrian Wong and a 2022 first-round pick; Magnolia acquired David Murrell and Abu Tratter)	Ateneo
11	Cade Flores	PF/C	Australia	NorthPort Batang Pier (from Barangay Ginebra) (Note: September 20, 2022: Barangay Ginebra to NorthPort: NorthPort acquired Prince Caperal, Arvin Tolentino, and a 2022 first-round pick; Barangay Ginebra acquired Jamie Malonzo)	Arellano
12	Taylor Miller	SG	United States	Terrafirma Dyip (from San Miguel) (Note: February 2, 2021: San Miguel to Terrafirma: Terrafirma acquired Russel Escoto, Matt Ganuelas-Rosser, Gelo Alolino, 2020 and 2022 first-round picks; San Miguel acquired CJ Perez)	Westminster (UT)

=== 2nd round ===
Pick	Player	Pos.	Country of birth	Team	School / club team
13	Kemark Cariño	C/PF	Philippines	Terrafirma Dyip	San Beda / Muntinlupa Cagers (MPBL)
14	Bryan Santos	PF	Philippines	Converge FiberXers (from Blackwater) (Note: October 12, 2021: Blackwater to Alaska (Converge): Alaska acquired Mike Tolomia and a 2022 second-round pick; Blackwater acquired JVee Casio and Barkley Eboña)	UST
15	Henry Galinato	C/PF	United States	Rain or Shine Elasto Painters	UP Diliman
16	Raffy Verano	SF/PF	United States	Phoenix Super LPG Fuel Masters	Ateneo / Quezon Huskers (MPBL)
17	Ricci Rivero^{#}	SG	Philippines	Phoenix Super LPG Fuel Masters (from NorthPort via TNT, Blackwater, and NLEX) (Note: June 10, 2019: NorthPort to TNT (three-team trade with NLEX): TNT acquired Marion Magat, 2021 and 2022 second-round picks (from NorthPort); NorthPort acquired Michael Miranda, a 2019 second-round pick that was not conveyed (from Phoenix via NLEX), and a 2020 second-round pick (from Terrafirma [Columbian] via NLEX); NLEX acquired Jericho Cruz and a 2020 second-round pick (from San Miguel via NorthPort); December 3, 2021: TNT to Blackwater: Blackwater acquired Jay Washington, 2022 and 2025 second-round picks; TNT acquired Carl Bryan Cruz; September 19, 2022: Blackwater to NLEX (three-team trade with TNT): NLEX acquired Brandon Ganuelas-Rosser, 2022 and 2025 second-round picks (from Blackwater); Blackwater acquired Gab Banal and Troy Rosario; TNT acquired Calvin Oftana and Raul Soyud; January 18, 2023: NLEX to Phoenix Super LPG (three-team trade with TNT): Phoenix Super LPG acquired Jjay Alejandro, Raul Soyud, NLEX's 2022 highest second-round pick, and a 2026 second-round pick (from TNT); NLEX acquired Sean Anthony and Jake Pascual; TNT acquired Justin Chua and Paul Varilla)	UP Diliman
18	Enoch Valdez	SF/SG	Philippines	NLEX Road Warriors	Lyceum
19	JL delos Santos	PG	Philippines	Converge FiberXers	JRU / Muntinlupa Cagers (MPBL)
20	James Kwekuteye	SG	Canada	Blackwater Bossing (from Meralco) (Note: October 25, 2019: Meralco to Blackwater: Blackwater acquired KG Canaleta, Mike Tolomia, 2020 and 2022 second-round picks; Meralco acquired Allein Maliksi and Raymar Jose)	San Beda / Bacoor City Strikers (MPBL)
21	Jhan Nermal	SF	Philippines	NLEX Road Warriors (from TNT via Blackwater) (Note: December 28, 2018: TNT to Blackwater (three-team trade with NLEX): Blackwater acquired Abu Tratter and Paul Desiderio from NLEX; Alfrancis Tamsi and a 2022 second-round pick from TNT; NLEX acquired Poy Erram from Blackwater and Philip Paredes from TNT; TNT acquired Michael Miranda and San Miguel's 2022 second-round pick from Blackwater; March 11, 2021: Blackwater to NLEX (three-team trade with TNT): NLEX acquired Don Trollano, Roi Sumang, Maurice Shaw, and a 2022 second-round pick (from TNT via Blackwater); Blackwater acquired David Semerad, Simon Enciso, a 2023 first-round pick (from TNT), and a 2024 second-round pick (from TNT); TNT acquired a 2020 first-round pick (from NLEX))	West Negros / Bacoor City Strikers (MPBL)
22	Louie Sangalang	PF/C	Philippines	Terrafirma Dyip (from Magnolia) (Note: July 15, 2021: Magnolia to Terrafirma: Terrafirma acquired a 2022 second-round pick; Magnolia acquired Russel Escoto)	Letran / Pampanga G Lanterns (MPBL)
23	Ralph Cu	PF/SF	Philippines	Barangay Ginebra San Miguel	De La Salle
24	Adrian Nocum^{#}	SG	Philippines	Rain or Shine Elasto Painters (from San Miguel via Blackwater and TNT) (Note: December 19, 2018: San Miguel to Blackwater: Blackwater acquired 2021 and 2022 second-round picks; San Miguel acquired Paul Zamar; December 28, 2018: Blackwater to TNT (three-team trade with NLEX): See TNT to Blackwater; January 14, 2020: TNT to Rain or Shine: Rain or Shine acquired 2020, 2021 (from NorthPort), and 2022 (from San Miguel) second-round picks; TNT acquired Ed Daquioag)	Mapúa / San Juan Knights (MPBL)

=== 3rd round ===
Pick	Player	Pos.	Country of birth	Team	School / club team
25	JB Bahio	PF/C	Philippines	Terrafirma Dyip	San Beda / Pampanga Giant Lanterns (MPBL)
26	Clifford Jopia	C	Philippines	Blackwater Bossing	San Beda
27	Sherwin Concepcion	SF	Philippines	Rain or Shine Elasto Painters	UST / Nueva Ecija Rice Vanguards (MPBL)
28	Matthew Daves	PF/C	Canada	Phoenix Super LPG Fuel Masters	Ateneo
29	Brent Paraiso	SG	Philippines	NorthPort Batang Pier	Letran
30	Dominick Fajardo	SF/PF	Philippines	NLEX Road Warriors	Bulacan State
31	Inand Fornilos	SF/PF	Thailand	Converge FiberXers	Ateneo / Marikina Shoemasters (MPBL)
32	Jolo Mendoza	SG	Philippines	Meralco Bolts	Ateneo / Rizal Golden Coolers (MPBL)
33	Patrick Maagdenberg	C/PF	New Zealand	Magnolia Chicken Timplados Hotshots	Ateneo
34	Kim Aurin	SG/SF	Philippines	Barangay Ginebra San Miguel	Perpetual
35	Troy Mallillin	PF/SF	Philippines	San Miguel Beermen	Ateneo / Rizal Golden Coolers (MPBL)

- TNT passed during the round.

=== 4th round ===
Pick	Player	Pos.	Country of birth	Team	School / club team
36	Tommy Olivario	PG	Philippines	Terrafirma Dyip	Letran
37	Archie Concepcion	SF/SG	Philippines	Blackwater Bossing	Arellano / Pampanga G Lanterns (MPBL)
38	JC Cullar	PG	Italy	Rain or Shine Elasto Painters	Benilde
39	John Lloyd Clemente	PG	Philippines	Phoenix Super LPG Fuel Masters	NU / Pampanga G Lanterns (MPBL)
40	Fran Yu	PG	Philippines	NorthPort Batang Pier	Letran / San Juan Knights (MPBL)
41	Francis Giussani	SG/SF	Qatar	NLEX Road Warriors	Enderun
42	King Caralipio	SF	Philippines	Converge FiberXers	Letran / Zamboanga Family's Brand Sardines (MPBL)
43	Zach Huang	PF	Philippines	Meralco Bolts	UST / San Juan Knights (MPBL)
44	Rey Anthony Peralta	SG	Philippines	Magnolia Chicken Timplados Hotshots	Perpetual
45	Franz Abuda	SF	United States	Barangay Ginebra San Miguel	San Beda
46	Jayson Apolonio	SF	Philippines	San Miguel Beermen	Letran / Pampanga G Lanterns (MPBL)

=== 5th round ===
Pick	Player	Pos.	Country of birth	Team	School / club team
47	Damie Cuntapay	C	Philippines	Terrafirma Dyip	San Beda
48	Dariel Bayla	SF/PF	Philippines	Blackwater Bossing	Arellano
49	Larry Arpia	PG/SG	Northern Mariana Islands	Rain or Shine Elasto Painters	San Sebastian
50	Daniel Atienza	PG	Philippines	Phoenix Super LPG Fuel Masters	Centro Escolar
51	John Amores	SG	Philippines	NorthPort Batang Pier	JRU / Muntinlupa Cagers (MPBL)
52	Lorenzo Navarro	PG	Philippines	NLEX Road Warriors	Lyceum / Iloilo United Royals (MPBL)
53	Rhinwil Yambing	SF	Philippines	Converge FiberXers	San Sebastian / San Juan Knights (MPBL)
54	Jessie Sumoda	C	Philippines	Meralco Bolts	San Sebastian / Sarangani Marlins (MPBL)
55	Warren Bonifacio	PF	Philippines	Magnolia Chicken Timplados Hotshots	Mapúa
56	Brandrey Bienes	C/PF	Philippines	Barangay Ginebra San Miguel	FEU
57	Ichie Altamirano	PG	Philippines	San Miguel Beermen	San Sebastian / Negros Muscovados (MPBL)

=== 6th round ===
Pick	Player	Pos.	Country of birth	Team	School / club team
58	Kenneth Villapando	SF	Philippines	Terrafirma Dyip	San Sebastian
59	Joe Gómez de Liaño	SG	Philippines	Phoenix Super LPG Fuel Masters	UP Diliman / Marikina Shoemasters (MPBL)
60	Jan Sobrevega	PG/SG	Philippines	NorthPort Batang Pier	UE
61	Kamron Vigan-Fleming	SF	United States	Converge FiberXers	Bethesda
62	Shean Jackson	SG	United States	Meralco Bolts	Cheyenne HS
63	Christian Buñag	C	Philippines	Magnolia Chicken Timplados Hotshots	Mapúa / San Juan Knights (MPBL)
64	John Gob	C/PF	Philippines	San Miguel Beermen	UP Diliman / Rizal Golden Coolers (MPBL)

- Blackwater, Rain or Shine, NLEX, and Barangay Ginebra passed during the round.

=== 7th round ===
Pick	Player	Pos.	Country of birth	Team	School / club team
65	Jeric Pido	PG	Philippines	Terrafirma Dyip	Mapúa / Rizal Golden Coolers (MPBL)
66	Theo Flores	SG/SF	Philippines	Phoenix Super LPG Fuel Masters	NU
67	Ian Herrera	C	Philippines	NorthPort Batang Pier	UST
68	Raymond Binuya	PG	Philippines	Converge FiberXers	San Sebastian / Pampanga G Lanterns (MPBL)
69	Jayvee dela Cruz	PG/SG	Philippines	San Miguel Beermen	UC

- Meralco and Magnolia passed during the round.

=== 8th round ===
Pick	Player	Pos.	Country of birth	Team	School / club team
70	Enrique Caunan	PF	Philippines	Terrafirma Dyip	UST
71	Johnnel Bauzon	C/PF	Philippines	NorthPort Batang Pier	Diliman College
72	MJ Garcia	PG/SG	Philippines	Converge FiberXers	System Plus / Pampanga Giant Lanterns (MPBL)
73	Jamel Ramos	PG	United States	San Miguel Beermen	Reed HS

- Phoenix Super LPG passed during the round.

=== 9th round ===
Pick	Player	Pos.	Country of birth	Team	School / club team
74	Jomari Lacastesantos	PG/SG	Philippines	NorthPort Batang Pier	Lyceum
75	Andre Flores	SF/PF	Philippines	Converge FiberXers	Ateneo
76	Kyt Jimenez	PG/SG	Saudi Arabia	San Miguel Beermen	Perpetual / GenSan Warriors (MPBL)

- Terrafirma passed during the round.

=== 10th round ===
Pick	Player	Pos.	Country of birth	Team	School / club team
77	Nikko Paranada	PG	United States	NorthPort Batang Pier	UE
78	Jonathan del Rosario	PG/SG	Philippines	Converge FiberXers	Amando Cope College

- San Miguel passed during the round.

=== 11th round ===
Pick	Player	Pos.	Country of birth	Team	School / club team
79	Regie Boy Basibas	SF	Philippines	NorthPort Batang Pier	UST / Bacolod City of Smiles (MPBL)

- Converge passed during the round.

=== 12th round ===
A twelfth round was held, but NorthPort passed, thus ending the draft.

== Trades involving draft picks ==
NOTE: Due to the postponement of the PBA season 46 draft, all draft picks from 2020 onwards are executed one year later.

=== Pre-draft trades ===
Prior to the draft, the following trades were made and resulted in exchanges of draft picks between teams. Converge retained the right to Alaska's second-round picks.

== Combine ==
The PBA draft combine for this edition of the draft was held from September 12 to 13 at the Gatorade Hoops Center in Mandaluyong, with a record-breaking 128 applicants expected to attend. Archie Concepcion was named the draft combine MVP as his team won the mini-tournament, and he, Adrian Nocum, Ralph Cu, Jayson Apolonio, and Warren Bonifacio were named to the Mythical Five.

== Eligibility and entrants ==
Applications for the draft began on July 22 and ended on September 11. The final tally was brought down to 124 as several players either failed to attend both days of the draft combine or withdrew their application.

The eligibility rules for the PBA draft were revised and adopted starting from Season 48. Among the changes were:

- Removal of the 30-year age limit for Filipino-Foreigners
- Standardized rules applicable for both local and Filipino-Foreigners
  - Players 22 years old and older are generally eligible
  - Players at least 19 years old are eligible if they have two years of college completed.
- Players must have studied and played in Philippine collegiate leagues prior to playing in professional overseas leagues.
  - Players must enter the draft on their third year of eligibility
  - Those who did on their fourth or fifth year of eligibility after playing in a professional league overseas, would have to undergo a special computer-generated lottery among the 12 teams.
  - The application of those who did in their sixth year of eligibility or beyond is subject to conditions and approval by the Board.

=== Notable entrants ===
==== Domestic league players ====
In this section, only entrants who have played for a UAAP, NCAA, CESAFI, UCAL, NCRAA, NAASCU or U.S. NCAA school are included. Additionally, all listed entrants have played in the Maharlika Pilipinas Basketball League prior to the draft unless specified.

- Franz Abuda – F, San Beda / Rizal Golden Coolers
- Ichie Altamirano – G, San Sebastian / Negros Muscovados
- John Amores – G, JRU / Muntinlupa Cagers
- Jayson Apolonio – F, Letran / Pampanga Giant Lanterns
- Michael Are – G, San Sebastian / Rizal Golden Coolers
- Larry Arpia – G, San Sebastian / Makati × MNL Kingpin
- JB Bahio – F/C, San Beda / Pampanga Giant Lanterns
- Regie Boy Basibas – F, UST / Bacolod City of Smiles
- Brandrey Bienes – C/F, FEU / Pasay Voyagers
- Raymond Binuya – G, San Sebastian / Pampanga Giant Lanterns
- Christian Buñag – C, Mapúa / San Juan Knights
- Rommel Calahat – F, San Sebastian / Sarangani Marlins
- King Caralipio – G, Letran / Zamboanga Family's Brand Sardines
- Kemark Cariño – C/F, San Beda / Muntinlupa Cagers
- Enrique Caunan – F, UST / Sarangani Marlins
- John Lloyd Clemente – G, NU / Pampanga Giant Lanterns
- Archie Concepcion – F, Arellano / Pampanga Giant Lanterns
- Sherwin Concepcion – F, UST / Nueva Ecija Rice Vanguards
- Ammar Cosari – F/C, San Sebastian / Sarangani Marlins
- Ryan Costelo – G, San Sebastian / Pasig City MCW Sports
- JC Cullar – G, Benilde / Makati OKBet Kings
- Matthew Daves – F, Ateneo / Makati OKBet Kings
- JL delos Santos – G, JRU / Muntinlupa Cagers
- Andre Flores – F, Ateneo / Quezon City Gaz N Go
- Theo Flores – G/F, NU / Iloilo United Royals
- Inand Fornilos – F, Ateneo / Marikina Shoemasters
- Rodney Fuentes – F, EAC / Rizal Golden Coolers
- Fletcher Galvez – F, USJ–R / Cagayan de Oro Higalas (PSL)
- John Gob – C/F, UP / Rizal Golden Coolers
- Joe Gómez de Liaño – G, UP / Marikina Shoemasters
- Joshua Gonzales – De La Salle / Batangas City Embassy Chill
- Zach Huang – F, UST / San Juan Knights
- Shaquille Imperial – G, SWU-PHINMA / Iloilo United Royals
- Kyt Jimenez – G, Perpetual / GenSan Warriors
- James Kwekuteye – G, San Beda / Bacoor City Strikers
- Jomari Lacastesantos – G, Lyceum / Rizal Golden Coolers
- Omar Larupay – F, Lyceum / Iloilo United Royals
- Onzo Lorenzana – F, UE / Makati OKBet Kings
- Michael Macion – F, Adamson / Valenzuela XUR Homes Realty Inc.
- John Mahari – G/F, Diliman College / Zamboanga Family's Brand Sardines
- Troy Mallillin – F, Ateneo / Rizal Golden Coolers
- Jaybie Mantilla – G, UP / Cebu Sharks
- Alwin Margallo – G, Adamson / CamSur Express (NBL)
- Lean Martel – F/C, Perpetual / Parañaque Patriots
- Jolo Mendoza – G, Ateneo / Rizal Golden Coolers
- Shane Menina – G, Arellano / Pasig City MCW Sports
- Egie Boy Mojica – F, Adamson / San Juan Kings (PSL)
- Lorenzo Navarro – G, Lyceum / Iloilo United Royals
- Adrian Nocum – G, Mapúa / San Juan Knights
- Irven Palencia – G, St. Clare / Caloocan Batang Kankaloo
- Mico Pallares – G, Lyceum / Laguna Heroes
- Nikko Panganiban – G, OLFU / San Juan Knights
- Jimboy Pasturan – G, Benilde / Bacoor City Strikers
- Rey Anthony Peralta – G, Perpetual / San Juan Knights
- Jeric Pido – G, Mapúa / Rizal Golden Coolers
- JR Raflores – F, UE / Bulacan Kuyas
- Dyll Roncal – G, SWU-PHINMA / Imus Bandera
- Louie Sangalang – F, Letran / Pampanga Giant Lanterns
- Jeric Serrano – F, Lyceum / Pasay Voyagers
- Jessie Sumoda – C, San Sebastian / San Juan Knights
- Hero Tomilloso – F, UE / Dumaguete Warriors (VisMin)
- Reeve Usgang – C/F, FEU / San Juan Knights
- Raffy Verano – G/F, Ateneo / Quezon Huskers
- Laurenz Victoria – G, Mapúa / Pasay Voyagers
- Fran Yu – G, Letran / San Juan Knights

==== International league players ====
- Christian David – F, Butler / Seoul Samsung Thunders (Korea)
- Stephen Holt – G, Saint Mary's / CSM U Oradea (Romania)
- Richie Rodger – G, UE / Taranaki Airs (New Zealand)
- Kenneth Tuffin – F, FEU / Wellington Saints (New Zealand)

==== PBA on Tour / PBA D-League / PBA 3x3 players ====
- Daniel Atienza – G, NU / Phoenix Fuel Masters
- Kim Aurin – G, Perpetual / Barangay Ginebra San Miguel
- Brandon Bates – C, De La Salle / Platinum Karaoke
- Johnnel Bauzon – C/F, Diliman College / NorthPort Batang Pier
- Dariel Bayla – F, Arellano / Blackwater Smooth Razor
- Ralph Cu – F, De La Salle / Barangay Ginebra
- Keith Datu – F, Chico State / Wilcon Depot 3x3
- Jayvee Dela Cruz – G, UC / San Miguel Beermen
- Dominick Fajardo – F, Bulacan State / Cavitex Braves
- Francis Giussani – G/F, Enderun / NLEX Road Warriors
- Patrick Jamison – G, NJIT / Blackwater Smooth Razor
- Ricci Rivero – G, UP / Blackwater Smooth Razor
- Jan Sobrevega – G, UE / NorthPort Batang Pier
- Luis Villegas – C, UE / TNT Triple Giga

==== UAAP and NCAA players ====
- BJ Andrade – G, Ateneo
- Warren Bonifacio – F, Mapúa
- Damie Cuntapay – C/F, San Beda
- Cade Flores – F, Arellano
- Henry Galinato – F, UP
- Clifford Jopia – C, San Beda
- Ian Herrera – C, UST
- Zavier Lucero – F, UP
- Patrick Maagdenberg – C/F, Ateneo
- Tommy Olivario – G, Letran
- Brent Paraiso – G, Letran
- Nikko Paranada – G, UE
- Bryan Santos – F, UST
- Enoch Valdez – G, Letran
- Alfonso Ventura – G, Benilde
- Kenneth Villapando – F, San Sebastian
- Schonny Winston – G, De La Salle
- Rhinwil Yambing – F, San Sebastian

==== U.S. NCAA and U.S. high school players ====
- Marco Guzman – G, Curry College
- Shean Jackson – G, Cheyenne HS
- Taylor Miller – G, Westminster University
- Jamel Ramos – G, Reed HS
- Kamron Vigan-Fleming – G, Bethesda University
