= 2023–24 PBA 3x3 season – First conference =

First conference of the 2023–24 PBA 3x3 season

The first conference of the 2023–24 PBA 3x3 season started on July 3 and ended on August 13, 2023. It consisted of six two-day legs and a grand final. TNT Triple Giga became the Grand Champion for the fifth straight conference after defeating Cavitex Braves in the Grand Finals, 21–18.

== Teams ==
The players listed have played in at least one of the legs.

Team	Players					
Barangay Ginebra San Miguel	Kim Aurin	Ralph Cu	John Jeryl Española	Donald Gumaru	Ralph Salcedo	Nichole Ubalde
Blackwater Smooth Razor	JR Alabanza	Monbert Arong	Dariel Bayla	Patrick Jamison	Rey Publico	Nico Salva
Cavitex Braves	Dominick Fajardo	Bong Galanza	Tonino Gonzaga	Kenneth Ighalo	Marion Magat	Jorey Napoles
Meralco Bolts 3x3	Alfred Batino	Reymar Caduyac	Patrick Maagdenberg	Jeff Manday	Bryan Santos	Joseph Sedurifa
NorthPort Batang Pier	Johnnel Bauzon	Jebb Bulawan	Gabe Capacio	Gwyne Capacio	Jan Sobrevega	Dexter Zamora
Pioneer ElastoSeal Katibays	Gian Abrigo	Wilson Baltazar	Enrique Caunan	Kenneth Mocon	Reggie Morido	Dennice Villamor
Purefoods TJ Titans	Christian Buñag	Mikey Cabahug	Martin Gozum	Christian Rivera	Med Salim	Joshua Webb
San Miguel Beermen	John Apacible	Ken Bono	Leo de Vera	Charles Justin Lazarte	Marvin Lee	Chester Saldua
Terrafirma 3x3	Shaq Alanes	Red Cachuela	Andre Duremdes	Jordan Rios	Jeremiah Taladua	Jason Tan
TNT Triple Giga	Samboy de Leon	Chris Exciminiano	Lervin Flores	Gryann Mendoza	Matt Salem	Almond Vosotros
Wilcon Depot 3x3	Yutien Andrada	Raphael Banal	Keith Datu	Terrence Tumalip	Louie Vigil	

== 1st leg ==
=== Groupings ===
Pool A	Pool B	Pool C
TNT Triple Giga; Pioneer ElastoSeal Katibays; Blackwater Smooth Razor	Cavitex Braves; San Miguel Beermen; Purefoods TJ Titans; Wilcon Depot 3x3	Meralco Bolts 3x3 Barangay Ginebra San Miguel; NorthPort Batang Pier; Terrafirma 3x3

=== Preliminary round ===
==== Pool A ====
Pos	Team	Pld	W	L	PF	PA	PD	PCT	Qualification
1	TNT Triple Giga	2	2	0	33	28	+5	1.000	Quarterfinals
2	Pioneer ElastoSeal Katibays	2	1	1	26	27	−1	.500	Quarterfinals
3	Blackwater Smooth Razor	2	0	2	31	35	−4	.000	

Source: PBA 3x3
Rules for classification: 1) Wins; Win ratio if unequal number of games; 2) Head-to-head record; 3) Average points per game; 4) Higher seed.

July 3
10:30 am

Report

TNT Triple Giga	20–17	Blackwater Smooth Razor

Ayala Malls Manila Bay

July 3
11:45 am

Report

Pioneer ElastoSeal Katibays	15–14	Blackwater Smooth Razor

Ayala Malls Manila Bay

July 3
1:00 pm

Report

TNT Triple Giga	13–11	Pioneer ElastoSeal Katibays

Ayala Malls Manila Bay

==== Pool B ====
Pos	Team	Pld	W	L	PF	PA	PD	PCT	Qualification
1	Wilcon Depot 3x3	3	3	0	57	45	+12	1.000	Quarterfinals
2	Cavitex Braves	3	2	1	52	45	+7	.667	Quarterfinals
3	San Miguel Beermen	3	1	2	49	54	−5	.333	Quarterfinals
4	Purefoods TJ Titans	3	0	3	44	58	−14	.000	

Source: PBA 3x3
Rules for classification: 1) Wins; Win ratio if unequal number of games; 2) Head-to-head record; 3) Average points per game; 4) Higher seed.

July 3
10:55 am

Report

Cavitex Braves	16–18	Wilcon Depot 3x3

Ayala Malls Manila Bay

July 3
12:10 pm

Report

San Miguel Beermen	20–17	Purefoods TJ Titans

Ayala Malls Manila Bay

July 3
1:25 pm

Report

Wilcon Depot 3x3	18–13	Purefoods TJ Titans

Ayala Malls Manila Bay

July 3
2:15 pm

Report

Cavitex Braves	16–13	San Miguel Beermen

Ayala Malls Manila Bay

July 3
3:05 pm

Report

San Miguel Beermen	16–21	Wilcon Depot 3x3

Ayala Malls Manila Bay

July 4
10:30 am

Report

Purefoods TJ Titans	14–20	Cavitex Braves

Ayala Malls Manila Bay

==== Pool C ====
Pos	Team	Pld	W	L	PF	PA	PD	PCT	Qualification
1	Barangay Ginebra San Miguel	3	3	0	59	35	+24	1.000	Quarterfinals
2	Meralco Bolts 3x3	3	2	1	52	43	+9	.667	Quarterfinals
3	Terrafirma 3x3	3	1	2	46	56	−10	.333	Quarterfinals
4	NorthPort Batang Pier	3	0	3	40	63	−23	.000	

Source: PBA 3x3
Rules for classification: 1) Wins; Win ratio if unequal number of games; 2) Head-to-head record; 3) Average points per game; 4) Higher seed.

July 3
11:20 am

Report

Meralco Bolts 3x3	19–13	Terrafirma 3x3

Ayala Malls Manila Bay

July 3
12:35 pm

Report

Barangay Ginebra San Miguel	21–11	NorthPort Batang Pier

Ayala Malls Manila Bay

July 3
1:50 pm

Report

Terrafirma 3x3	21–15	NorthPort Batang Pier

Ayala Malls Manila Bay

July 3
2:40 pm

Report

Meralco Bolts 3x3	12–16	Barangay Ginebra San Miguel

Ayala Malls Manila Bay

July 3
3:30 pm

Report

Barangay Ginebra San Miguel	22–12	Terrafirma 3x3

Ayala Malls Manila Bay

July 4
10:55 am

Report

NorthPort Batang Pier	14–21	Meralco Bolts 3x3

Ayala Malls Manila Bay

=== Knockout stage ===
Barangay Ginebra San Miguel defeated San Miguel Beermen in the finals, 19–17, to become the first leg winners.

==== Bracket ====
Quarterfinals
A1	TNT Triple Giga	14
B3	San Miguel Beermen	22
C2	Meralco Bolts 3x3	17
B2	Cavitex Braves	21
B1	Wilcon Depot 3x3	18
C3	Terrafirma 3x3	20
C1	Barangay Ginebra San Miguel	19
A2	Pioneer ElastoSeal Katibays	16

Semifinals
B3	San Miguel Beermen	18
B2	Cavitex Braves	10
C3	Terrafirma 3x3	13
C1	Barangay Ginebra San Miguel	17

Finals
B3	San Miguel Beermen	17
C1	Barangay Ginebra San Miguel	19
Third place
B2	Cavitex Braves	21
C3	Terrafirma 3x3	15

==== Quarterfinals ====
July 4
11:20 am

Report

TNT Triple Giga	14–22	San Miguel Beermen

Ayala Malls Manila Bay

July 4
11:45 am

Report

Meralco Bolts 3x3	17–21	Cavitex Braves

Ayala Malls Manila Bay

July 4
12:10 pm

Report

Wilcon Depot 3x3	18–20	Terrafirma 3x3

Ayala Malls Manila Bay

July 4
12:35 pm

Report

Barangay Ginebra San Miguel	19–16	Pioneer ElastoSeal Katibays

Ayala Malls Manila Bay

==== Semifinals ====
July 4
1:00 pm

Report

San Miguel Beermen	18–10	Cavitex Braves

Ayala Malls Manila Bay

July 4
1:25 pm

Report

Terrafirma 3x3	13–17	Barangay Ginebra San Miguel

Ayala Malls Manila Bay

==== Third place game ====
July 4
2:10 pm

Report

Cavitex Braves	21–15	Terrafirma 3x3

Ayala Malls Manila Bay

==== Finals ====
July 4
2:35 pm

Report

San Miguel Beermen	17–19	Barangay Ginebra San Miguel

Ayala Malls Manila Bay

=== Final standings ===
Pos	Team	Pld	W	L	PCT	AVG	PF	Tour points
1	Barangay Ginebra San Miguel	6	6	0	1.000	19.0	114	100
2	San Miguel Beermen	6	3	3	.500	17.7	106	80
3	Cavitex Braves	6	4	2	.667	17.3	104	70
4	Terrafirma 3x3	6	2	4	.333	15.7	94	60
Eliminated at the quarterfinals
5	Wilcon Depot 3x3	4	3	1	.750	18.8	75	50
6	TNT Triple Giga	3	2	1	.667	15.7	47	45
7	Meralco Bolts 3x3	4	2	2	.500	17.3	69	40
8	Pioneer ElastoSeal Katibays	3	1	2	.333	14.0	42	35
Eliminated at the preliminary round
9	Blackwater Smooth Razor	2	0	2	.000	15.5	31	20
10	Purefoods TJ Titans	3	0	3	.000	14.7	44	18
11	NorthPort Batang Pier	3	0	3	.000	13.3	40	16

Source: PBA 3x3

== 2nd leg ==
=== Groupings ===
Pool A	Pool B	Pool C
Barangay Ginebra San Miguel (1); TNT Triple Giga (6); Meralco Bolts 3x3 (7)	San Miguel Beermen (2); Wilcon Depot 3x3 (5); Pioneer ElastoSeal Katibays (8); NorthPort Batang Pier (11)	Cavitex Braves (3); Terrafirma 3x3 (4); Blackwater Smooth Razor (9); Purefoods TJ Titans (10)

=== Preliminary round ===
==== Pool A ====
Pos	Team	Pld	W	L	PF	PA	PD	PCT	Qualification
1	Meralco Bolts 3x3	2	1	1	36	32	+4	.500	Quarterfinals
2	Barangay Ginebra San Miguel	2	1	1	35	35	0	.500	Quarterfinals
3	TNT Triple Giga	2	1	1	32	36	−4	.500	

Source: PBA 3x3
Rules for classification: 1) Wins; Win ratio if unequal number of games; 2) Head-to-head record; 3) Average points per game; 4) Higher seed.

July 10
12:35 pm

Report

Barangay Ginebra San Miguel	14–21	Meralco Bolts 3x3

Ayala Malls Circuit

July 10
1:45 pm

Report

TNT Triple Giga	18–15	Meralco Bolts 3x3

Ayala Malls Circuit

July 10
3:00 pm

Report

Barangay Ginebra San Miguel	21–14	TNT Triple Giga

Ayala Malls Circuit

==== Pool B ====
Pos	Team	Pld	W	L	PF	PA	PD	PCT	Qualification
1	Pioneer ElastoSeal Katibays	3	2	1	57	44	+13	.667	Quarterfinals
2	San Miguel Beermen	3	2	1	56	44	+12	.667	Quarterfinals
3	Wilcon Depot 3x3	3	2	1	50	47	+3	.667	Quarterfinals
4	NorthPort Batang Pier	3	0	3	35	63	−28	.000	

Source: PBA 3x3
Rules for classification: 1) Wins; Win ratio if unequal number of games; 2) Head-to-head record; 3) Average points per game; 4) Higher seed.

July 10
11:20 am

Report

Wilcon Depot 3x3	12–18	Pioneer ElastoSeal Katibays

Ayala Malls Circuit

July 10
11:45 am

Report

San Miguel Beermen	21–9	NorthPort Batang Pier

Ayala Malls Circuit

July 10
1:25 pm

Report

Wilcon Depot 3x3	21–15	NorthPort Batang Pier

Ayala Malls Circuit

July 10
2:10 pm

Report

Pioneer ElastoSeal Katibays	18–21	San Miguel Beermen

Ayala Malls Circuit

July 10
3:25 pm

Report

San Miguel Beermen	14–17	Wilcon Depot 3x3

Ayala Malls Circuit

July 11
10:30 am

Report

NorthPort Batang Pier	11–21	Pioneer ElastoSeal Katibays

Ayala Malls Circuit

==== Pool C ====
Pos	Team	Pld	W	L	PF	PA	PD	PCT	Qualification
1	Purefoods TJ Titans	3	2	1	57	52	+5	.667 (Note: Purefoods TJ Titans 1–0 Cavitex Braves)	Quarterfinals
2	Cavitex Braves	3	2	1	57	53	+4	.667	Quarterfinals
3	Blackwater Smooth Razor	3	1	2	51	57	−6	.333 (Note: Blackwater Smooth Razor 1–0 Terrafirma 3x3)	Quarterfinals
4	Terrafirma 3x3	3	1	2	55	58	−3	.333	

Source: PBA 3x3
Rules for classification: 1) Wins; Win ratio if unequal number of games; 2) Head-to-head record; 3) Average points per game; 4) Higher seed.
Notes:

July 10
10:30 am

Report

Terrafirma 3x3	16–22	Blackwater Smooth Razor

Ayala Malls Circuit

July 10
10:55 am

Report

Cavitex Braves	17–20	Purefoods TJ Titans

Ayala Malls Circuit

July 10
12:10 pm

Report

Terrafirma 3x3	21–16	Purefoods TJ Titans

Ayala Malls Circuit

July 10
1:00 pm

Report

Blackwater Smooth Razor	15–20	Cavitex Braves

Ayala Malls Circuit

July 10
2:35 pm

Report

Cavitex Braves	20–18	Terrafirma 3x3

Ayala Malls Circuit

July 11
10:55 am

Report

Purefoods TJ Titans	21–14	Blackwater Smooth Razor

Ayala Malls Circuit

=== Knockout stage ===
Barangay Ginebra San Miguel defeated Meralco Bolts 3x3 in the finals, 19–17, in overtime to become the second leg winners.

==== Bracket ====
Quarterfinals
A1	Meralco Bolts 3x3	14
B3	Wilcon Depot 3x3	13
C2	Cavitex Braves	19
B2	San Miguel Beermen	17
B1	Pioneer ElastoSeal Katibays	13
C3	Blackwater Smooth Razor	22
C1	Purefoods TJ Titans	13
A2	Barangay Ginebra San Miguel	17

Semifinals
A1	Meralco Bolts 3x3	21
C2	Cavitex Braves	18
C3	Blackwater Smooth Razor	17
A2	Barangay Ginebra San Miguel	22

Finals
A1	Meralco Bolts 3x3	17
A2	Barangay Ginebra San Miguel	19
Third place
C2	Cavitex Braves	19
C3	Blackwater Smooth Razor	15

==== Quarterfinals ====
July 11
11:20 am

Report

Meralco Bolts 3x3	14–13	Wilcon Depot 3x3

Ayala Malls Circuit

July 11
11:45 am

Report

Purefoods TJ Titans	13–17	Barangay Ginebra San Miguel

Ayala Malls Circuit

July 11
12:10 pm

Report

Cavitex Braves	19–17	San Miguel Beermen

Ayala Malls Circuit

July 11
12:35 pm

Report

Pioneer ElastoSeal Katibays	13–22	Blackwater Smooth Razor

Ayala Malls Circuit

==== Semifinals ====
July 11
1:00 pm

Report

Meralco Bolts 3x3	21–18	Cavitex Braves

Ayala Malls Circuit

July 11
1:25 pm

Report

Blackwater Smooth Razor	17–22	Barangay Ginebra San Miguel

Ayala Malls Circuit

==== Third place game ====
July 11
2:10 pm

Report

Cavitex Braves	19–15	Blackwater Smooth Razor

Ayala Malls Circuit

==== Finals ====
July 11
2:35 pm

Report

Meralco Bolts 3x3	17–19	Barangay Ginebra San Miguel

Ayala Malls Circuit

=== Final standings ===
Pos	Team	Pld	W	L	PCT	AVG	PF	Tour points
1	Barangay Ginebra San Miguel	5	4	1	.800	18.6	93	100
2	Meralco Bolts 3x3	5	3	2	.600	17.6	88	80
3	Cavitex Braves	6	4	2	.667	18.8	113	70
4	Blackwater Smooth Razor	6	2	4	.333	17.5	105	60
Eliminated at the quarterfinals
5	San Miguel Beermen	4	2	2	.500	18.3	73	50
6	Pioneer ElastoSeal Katibays	4	2	2	.500	17.5	70	45
7	Purefoods TJ Titans	4	2	2	.500	17.5	70	40
8	Wilcon Depot 3x3	4	2	2	.500	15.8	63	35
Eliminated at the preliminary round
9	TNT Triple Giga	2	1	1	.500	16.0	32	20
10	Terrafirma 3x3	3	1	2	.333	18.3	55	18
11	NorthPort Batang Pier	3	0	3	.000	11.7	35	16

Source: PBA 3x3

== 3rd leg ==
=== Groupings ===
Pool A	Pool B	Pool C
Barangay Ginebra San Miguel (1); Pioneer ElastoSeal Katibays (6); Purefoods TJ Titans (7)	Meralco Bolts 3x3 (2); San Miguel Beermen (5); Wilcon Depot 3x3 (8); NorthPort Batang Pier (11)	Cavitex Braves (3); Blackwater Smooth Razor (4); TNT Triple Giga (9); Terrafirma 3x3 (10)

=== Preliminary round ===
==== Pool A ====
Pos	Team	Pld	W	L	PF	PA	PD	PCT	Qualification
1	Pioneer ElastoSeal Katibays	2	2	0	33	25	+8	1.000	Quarterfinals
2	Barangay Ginebra San Miguel	2	1	1	26	30	−4	.500	Quarterfinals
3	Purefoods TJ Titans	2	0	2	26	30	−4	.000	

Source: PBA 3x3
Rules for classification: 1) Wins; Win ratio if unequal number of games; 2) Head-to-head record; 3) Average points per game; 4) Higher seed.

July 17
12:35 pm

Report

Pioneer ElastoSeal Katibays	15–14	Purefoods TJ Titans

Ayala Malls Manila Bay

July 17
1:45 pm

Report

Barangay Ginebra San Miguel	15–12	Purefoods TJ Titans

Ayala Malls Manila Bay

July 17
3:00 pm

Report

Barangay Ginebra San Miguel	11–18	Pioneer ElastoSeal Katibays

Ayala Malls Manila Bay

==== Pool B ====
Pos	Team	Pld	W	L	PF	PA	PD	PCT	Qualification
1	San Miguel Beermen	3	2	1	55	45	+10	.667	Quarterfinals
2	Wilcon Depot 3x3	3	2	1	53	45	+8	.667	Quarterfinals
3	Meralco Bolts 3x3	3	2	1	46	37	+9	.667	Quarterfinals
4	NorthPort Batang Pier	3	0	3	33	60	−27	.000	

Source: PBA 3x3
Rules for classification: 1) Wins; Win ratio if unequal number of games; 2) Head-to-head record; 3) Average points per game; 4) Higher seed.

July 17
11:20 am

Report

San Miguel Beermen	21–18	Wilcon Depot 3x3

Ayala Malls Manila Bay

July 17
11:45 am

Report

Meralco Bolts 3x3	19–9	NorthPort Batang Pier

Ayala Malls Manila Bay

July 17
1:25 pm

Report

San Miguel Beermen	21–13	NorthPort Batang Pier

Ayala Malls Manila Bay

July 17
2:10 pm

Report

Wilcon Depot 3x3	15–13	Meralco Bolts 3x3

Ayala Malls Manila Bay

July 17
3:25 pm

Report

Meralco Bolts 3x3	14–13	San Miguel Beermen

Ayala Malls Manila Bay

July 18
10:30 am

Report

NorthPort Batang Pier	11–20	Wilcon Depot 3x3

Ayala Malls Manila Bay

==== Pool C ====
Pos	Team	Pld	W	L	PF	PA	PD	PCT	Qualification
1	TNT Triple Giga	3	3	0	63	49	+14	1.000	Quarterfinals
2	Cavitex Braves	3	2	1	53	44	+9	.667	Quarterfinals
3	Blackwater Smooth Razor	3	1	2	44	50	−6	.333	Quarterfinals
4	Terrafirma 3x3	3	0	3	38	55	−17	.000	

Source: PBA 3x3
Rules for classification: 1) Wins; Win ratio if unequal number of games; 2) Head-to-head record; 3) Average points per game; 4) Higher seed.

July 17
10:30 am

Report

Blackwater Smooth Razor	18–21	TNT Triple Giga

Ayala Malls Manila Bay

July 17
10:55 am

Report

Cavitex Braves	21–10	Terrafirma 3x3

Ayala Malls Manila Bay

July 17
12:10 pm

Report

TNT Triple Giga	21–15	Cavitex Braves

Ayala Malls Manila Bay

July 17
1:00 pm

Report

Blackwater Smooth Razor	13–12	Terrafirma 3x3

Ayala Malls Manila Bay

July 17
2:35 pm

Report

Terrafirma 3x3	16–21	TNT Triple Giga

Ayala Malls Manila Bay

July 18
10:55 am

Report

Cavitex Braves	17–13	Blackwater Smooth Razor

Ayala Malls Manila Bay

=== Knockout stage ===
TNT Triple Giga defeated Pioneer ElastoSeal Katibays in the finals, 17–13, to become the third leg winners.

==== Bracket ====
Quarterfinals
A1	Pioneer ElastoSeal Katibays	21
B3	Meralco Bolts 3x3	19
C2	Cavitex Braves	19
B2	Wilcon Depot 3x3	17
B1	San Miguel Beermen	21
C3	Blackwater Smooth Razor	10
C1	TNT Triple Giga	21
A2	Barangay Ginebra San Miguel	19

Semifinals
A1	Pioneer ElastoSeal Katibays	19
C2	Cavitex Braves	17
B1	San Miguel Beermen	19
C1	TNT Triple Giga	20

Finals
A1	Pioneer ElastoSeal Katibays	13
C1	TNT Triple Giga	17
Third place
C2	Cavitex Braves	20
B1	San Miguel Beermen	19

==== Quarterfinals ====
July 18
11:20 am

Report

Pioneer ElastoSeal Katibays	21–19	Meralco Bolts 3x3

Ayala Malls Manila Bay

July 18
11:45 am

Report

TNT Triple Giga	21–19	Barangay Ginebra San Miguel

Ayala Malls Manila Bay

July 18
12:10 pm

Report

Cavitex Braves	19–17	Wilcon Depot 3x3

Ayala Malls Manila Bay

July 18
12:35 pm

Report

San Miguel Beermen	21–10	Blackwater Smooth Razor

Ayala Malls Manila Bay

==== Semifinals ====
July 18
1:00 pm

Report

Pioneer ElastoSeal Katibays	19–17	Cavitex Braves

Ayala Malls Manila Bay

July 18
1:25 pm

Report

San Miguel Beermen	19–20	TNT Triple Giga

Ayala Malls Manila Bay

==== Third place game ====
July 18
2:10 pm

Report

Cavitex Braves	20–19	San Miguel Beermen

Ayala Malls Manila Bay

==== Finals ====
July 18
2:35 pm

Report

Pioneer ElastoSeal Katibays	13–17	TNT Triple Giga

Ayala Malls Manila Bay

=== Final standings ===
Pos	Team	Pld	W	L	PCT	AVG	PF	Tour points
1	TNT Triple Giga	6	6	0	1.000	20.2	121	100
2	Pioneer ElastoSeal Katibays	5	4	1	.800	17.2	86	80
3	Cavitex Braves	6	4	2	.667	18.2	109	70
4	San Miguel Beermen	6	3	3	.500	19.0	114	60
Eliminated at the quarterfinals
5	Wilcon Depot 3x3	4	2	2	.500	17.5	70	50
6	Meralco Bolts 3x3	4	2	2	.500	16.3	65	45
7	Barangay Ginebra San Miguel	3	1	2	.333	15.0	45	40
8	Blackwater Smooth Razor	4	1	3	.250	13.5	54	35
Eliminated at the preliminary round
9	Purefoods TJ Titans	2	0	2	.000	13.0	26	20
10	Terrafirma 3x3	3	0	3	.000	12.7	38	18
11	NorthPort Batang Pier	3	0	3	.000	11.0	33	16

Source: PBA 3x3

== 4th leg ==
=== Groupings ===
Pool A	Pool B	Pool C
TNT Triple Giga (1); Meralco Bolts 3x3 (6); Barangay Ginebra San Miguel (7)	Pioneer ElastoSeal Katibays (2); Wilcon Depot 3x3 (5); Blackwater Smooth Razor (8); NorthPort Batang Pier (11)	Cavitex Braves (3); San Miguel Beermen (4); Purefoods TJ Titans (9); Terrafirma 3x3 (10)

=== Preliminary round ===
==== Pool A ====
Pos	Team	Pld	W	L	PF	PA	PD	PCT	Qualification
1	Meralco Bolts 3x3	2	2	0	40	28	+12	1.000	Quarterfinals
2	TNT Triple Giga	2	1	1	31	38	−7	.500	Quarterfinals
3	Barangay Ginebra San Miguel	2	0	2	32	37	−5	.000	

Source: PBA 3x3
Rules for classification: 1) Wins; Win ratio if unequal number of games; 2) Head-to-head record; 3) Average points per game; 4) Higher seed.

July 24
12:35 pm

Report

Meralco Bolts 3x3	19–15	Barangay Ginebra San Miguel

Ayala Malls Circuit

July 24
1:45 pm

Report

TNT Triple Giga	18–17	Barangay Ginebra San Miguel

Ayala Malls Circuit

July 24
3:00 pm

Report

TNT Triple Giga	13–21	Meralco Bolts 3x3

Ayala Malls Circuit

==== Pool B ====
Pos	Team	Pld	W	L	PF	PA	PD	PCT	Qualification
1	Wilcon Depot 3x3	3	3	0	49	43	+6	1.000	Quarterfinals
2	NorthPort Batang Pier	3	2	1	53	50	+3	.667	Quarterfinals
3	Blackwater Smooth Razor	3	1	2	50	53	−3	.333	Quarterfinals
4	Pioneer ElastoSeal Katibays	3	0	3	50	56	−6	.000	

Source: PBA 3x3
Rules for classification: 1) Wins; Win ratio if unequal number of games; 2) Head-to-head record; 3) Average points per game; 4) Higher seed.

July 24
11:20 am

Report

Wilcon Depot 3x3	14–13	Blackwater Smooth Razor

Ayala Malls Circuit

July 24
11:45 am

Report

Pioneer ElastoSeal Katibays	16–18	NorthPort Batang Pier

Ayala Malls Circuit

July 24
1:25 pm

Report

Wilcon Depot 3x3	18–14	NorthPort Batang Pier

Ayala Malls Circuit

July 24
2:10 pm

Report

Blackwater Smooth Razor	21–18	Pioneer ElastoSeal Katibays

Ayala Malls Circuit

July 24
3:25 pm

Report

Pioneer ElastoSeal Katibays	16–17	Wilcon Depot 3x3

Ayala Malls Circuit

July 25
10:30 am

Report

NorthPort Batang Pier	21–16	Blackwater Smooth Razor

Ayala Malls Circuit

==== Pool C ====
Pos	Team	Pld	W	L	PF	PA	PD	PCT	Qualification
1	San Miguel Beermen	3	3	0	55	44	+11	1.000	Quarterfinals
2	Cavitex Braves	3	2	1	49	47	+2	.667	Quarterfinals
3	Terrafirma 3x3	3	1	2	53	50	+3	.333	Quarterfinals
4	Purefoods TJ Titans	3	0	3	42	58	−16	.000	

Source: PBA 3x3
Rules for classification: 1) Wins; Win ratio if unequal number of games; 2) Head-to-head record; 3) Average points per game; 4) Higher seed.

July 24
10:30 am

Report

San Miguel Beermen	21–13	Purefoods TJ Titans

Ayala Malls Circuit

July 24
10:55 am

Report

Cavitex Braves	18–16	Terrafirma 3x3

Ayala Malls Circuit

July 24
12:10 pm

Report

Purefoods TJ Titans	18–19	Cavitex Braves

Ayala Malls Circuit

July 24
1:00 pm

Report

San Miguel Beermen	21–19	Terrafirma 3x3

Ayala Malls Circuit

July 24
2:3 pm

Report

Terrafirma 3x3	18–11	Purefoods TJ Titans

Ayala Malls Circuit

July 25
10:55 am

Report

Cavitex Braves	12–13	San Miguel Beermen

Ayala Malls Circuit

=== Knockout stage ===
Cavitex Braves defeated TNT Triple Giga in the finals, 21–17, to become the fourth leg winners.

==== Bracket ====
Quarterfinals
A1	Meralco Bolts 3x3	21
B3	Blackwater Smooth Razor	12
C2	Cavitex Braves	21
B2	NorthPort Batang Pier	16
B1	Wilcon Depot 3x3	16
C3	Terrafirma 3x3	14
C1	San Miguel Beermen	14
A2	TNT Triple Giga	21

Semifinals
A1	Meralco Bolts 3x3	15
C2	Cavitex Braves	17
B1	Wilcon Depot 3x3	20
A2	TNT Triple Giga	22

Finals
C2	Cavitex Braves	21
A2	TNT Triple Giga	17
Third place
A1	Meralco Bolts 3x3	21
B1	Wilcon Depot 3x3	20

==== Quarterfinals ====
July 25
11:20 am

Report

Meralco Bolts 3x3	21–12	Blackwater Smooth Razor

Ayala Malls Circuit

July 25
11:45 am

Report

San Miguel Beermen	14–21	TNT Triple Giga

Ayala Malls Circuit

July 25
12:10 pm

Report

Cavitex Braves	21–16	NorthPort Batang Pier

Ayala Malls Circuit

July 25
12:35 pm

Report

Wilcon Depot 3x3	16–14	Terrafirma 3x3

Ayala Malls Circuit

==== Semifinals ====
July 25
1:00 pm

Report

Meralco Bolts 3x3	15–17	Cavitex Braves

Ayala Malls Circuit

July 25
1:25 pm

Report

Wilcon Depot 3x3	20–22	TNT Triple Giga

Ayala Malls Circuit

==== Third place game ====
July 25
2:10 pm

Report

Meralco Bolts 3x3	21–20	Wilcon Depot 3x3

Ayala Malls Circuit

==== Finals ====
July 25
2:35 pm

Report

Cavitex Braves	21–17	TNT Triple Giga

Ayala Malls Circuit

=== Final standings ===
Pos	Team	Pld	W	L	PCT	AVG	PF	Tour points
1	Cavitex Braves	6	5	1	.833	18.0	108	100
2	TNT Triple Giga	5	3	2	.600	18.2	91	80
3	Meralco Bolts 3x3	5	4	1	.800	19.4	97	70
4	Wilcon Depot 3x3	6	4	2	.667	17.5	105	60
Eliminated at the quarterfinals
5	San Miguel Beermen	4	3	1	.750	17.3	69	50
6	NorthPort Batang Pier	4	2	2	.500	17.3	69	45
7	Terrafirma 3x3	4	1	3	.250	16.8	67	40
8	Blackwater Smooth Razor	4	1	3	.250	15.5	62	35
Eliminated at the preliminary round
9	Pioneer ElastoSeal Katibays	3	0	3	.000	16.7	50	20
10	Barangay Ginebra San Miguel	2	0	2	.000	16.0	32	18
11	Purefoods TJ Titans	3	0	3	.000	14.0	42	16

Source: PBA 3x3

== 5th leg ==
=== Groupings ===
Pool A	Pool B	Pool C
Cavitex Braves (1); NorthPort Batang Pier (6); Terrafirma 3x3 (7)	TNT Triple Giga (2); San Miguel Beermen (5); Blackwater Smooth Razor (8); Purefoods TJ Titans (11)	Meralco Bolts 3x3 (3); Wilcon Depot 3x3 (4); Pioneer ElastoSeal Katibays (9); Barangay Ginebra San Miguel (10)

=== Preliminary round ===
==== Pool A ====
Pos	Team	Pld	W	L	PF	PA	PD	PCT	Qualification
1	NorthPort Batang Pier	2	1	1	38	37	+1	.500	Quarterfinals
2	Cavitex Braves	2	1	1	36	29	+7	.500	Quarterfinals
3	Terrafirma 3x3	2	1	1	34	42	−8	.500	

Source: PBA 3x3
Rules for classification: 1) Wins; Win ratio if unequal number of games; 2) Head-to-head record; 3) Average points per game; 4) Higher seed.

July 31
12:35 pm

Report

NorthPort Batang Pier	21–22	Terrafirma 3x3

Ayala Malls Manila Bay

July 31
1:45 pm

Report

Cavitex Braves	21–12	Terrafirma 3x3

Ayala Malls Manila Bay

July 31
3:00 pm

Report

Cavitex Braves	15–17	NorthPort Batang Pier

Ayala Malls Manila Bay

==== Pool B ====
Pos	Team	Pld	W	L	PF	PA	PD	PCT	Qualification
1	TNT Triple Giga	3	2	1	54	48	+6	.667 (Note: TNT Triple Giga 1–0 Blackwater Smooth Razor)	Quarterfinals
2	Blackwater Smooth Razor	3	2	1	48	49	−1	.667	Quarterfinals
3	Purefoods TJ Titans	3	1	2	46	49	−3	.333 (Note: Purefoods TJ Titans 1–0 San Miguel Beermen)	Quarterfinals
4	San Miguel Beermen	3	1	2	56	58	−2	.333	

Source: PBA 3x3
Rules for classification: 1) Wins; Win ratio if unequal number of games; 2) Head-to-head record; 3) Average points per game; 4) Higher seed.
Notes:

July 31
11:20 am

Report

San Miguel Beermen	17–19	Blackwater Smooth Razor

Ayala Malls Manila Bay

July 31
11:45 am

Report

TNT Triple Giga	15–14	Purefoods TJ Titans

Ayala Malls Manila Bay

July 31
1:25 pm

Report

San Miguel Beermen	19–21	Purefoods TJ Titans

Ayala Malls Manila Bay

July 31
2:10 pm

Report

Blackwater Smooth Razor	14–21	TNT Triple Giga

Ayala Malls Manila Bay

July 31
3:25 pm

Report

TNT Triple Giga	18–20	San Miguel Beermen

Ayala Malls Manila Bay

August 1
10:30 am

Report

Purefoods TJ Titans	11–15	Blackwater Smooth Razor

Ayala Malls Manila Bay

==== Pool C ====
Pos	Team	Pld	W	L	PF	PA	PD	PCT	Qualification
1	Meralco Bolts 3x3	3	3	0	51	39	+12	1.000	Quarterfinals
2	Pioneer ElastoSeal Katibays	3	2	1	53	48	+5	.667	Quarterfinals
3	Barangay Ginebra San Miguel	3	1	2	53	54	−1	.333	Quarterfinals
4	Wilcon Depot 3x3	3	0	3	37	53	−16	.000	

Source: PBA 3x3
Rules for classification: 1) Wins; Win ratio if unequal number of games; 2) Head-to-head record; 3) Average points per game; 4) Higher seed.

July 31
10:30 am

Report

Wilcon Depot 3x3	10–18	Pioneer ElastoSeal Katibays

Ayala Malls Manila Bay

July 31
10:55 am

Report

Meralco Bolts 3x3	18–13	Barangay Ginebra San Miguel

Ayala Malls Manila Bay

July 31
12:10 pm

Report

Pioneer ElastoSeal Katibays	14–19	Meralco Bolts 3x3

Ayala Malls Manila Bay

July 31
1:00 pm

Report

Wilcon Depot 3x3	15–21	Barangay Ginebra San Miguel

Ayala Malls Manila Bay

July 31
2:35 pm

Report

Barangay Ginebra San Miguel	19–21	Pioneer ElastoSeal Katibays

Ayala Malls Manila Bay

August 1
10:55 am

Report

Meralco Bolts 3x3	14–12	Wilcon Depot 3x3

Ayala Malls Manila Bay

=== Knockout stage ===
Cavitex Braves defeated Pioneer ElastoSeal Katibays in the finals, 22–10, to become the fifth leg winners.

==== Bracket ====
Quarterfinals
A1	NorthPort Batang Pier	17
B3	Purefoods TJ Titans	14
C2	Pioneer ElastoSeal Katibays	14
B2	Blackwater Smooth Razor	12
B1	TNT Triple Giga	15
C3	Barangay Ginebra San Miguel	17
C1	Meralco Bolts 3x3	14
A2	Cavitex Braves	16

Semifinals
A1	NorthPort Batang Pier	13
C2	Pioneer ElastoSeal Katibays	18
C3	Barangay Ginebra San Miguel	19
A2	Cavitex Braves	20

Finals
C2	Pioneer ElastoSeal Katibays	10
A2	Cavitex Braves	22
Third place
A1	NorthPort Batang Pier	18
C3	Barangay Ginebra San Miguel	21

==== Quarterfinals ====
August 1
11:20 am

Report

NorthPort Batang Pier	17–14	Purefoods TJ Titans

Ayala Malls Manila Bay

August 1
11:45 am

Report

Meralco Bolts 3x3	14–16	Cavitex Braves

Ayala Malls Manila Bay

August 1
12:10 pm

Report

Pioneer ElastoSeal Katibays	14–12	Blackwater Smooth Razor

Ayala Malls Manila Bay

August 1
12:35 pm

Report

TNT Triple Giga	15–17	Barangay Ginebra San Miguel

Ayala Malls Manila Bay

==== Semifinals ====
August 1
1:00 pm

Report

NorthPort Batang Pier	13–18	Pioneer ElastoSeal Katibays

Ayala Malls Manila Bay

August 1
1:25 pm

Report

Barangay Ginebra San Miguel	19–20	Cavitex Braves

Ayala Malls Manila Bay

==== Third place game ====
August 1
2:10 pm

Report

NorthPort Batang Pier	18–21	Barangay Ginebra San Miguel

Ayala Malls Manila Bay

==== Finals ====
August 1
2:35 pm

Report

Pioneer ElastoSeal Katibays	10–22	Cavitex Braves

Ayala Malls Manila Bay

=== Final standings ===
Pos	Team	Pld	W	L	PCT	AVG	PF	Tour points
1	Cavitex Braves	5	4	1	.800	18.8	94	100
2	Pioneer ElastoSeal Katibays	6	4	2	.667	15.8	95	80
3	Barangay Ginebra San Miguel	6	3	3	.500	18.3	110	70
4	NorthPort Batang Pier	5	2	3	.400	17.2	86	60
Eliminated at the quarterfinals
5	Meralco Bolts 3x3	4	3	1	.750	16.3	65	50
6	TNT Triple Giga	4	2	2	.500	17.3	69	45
7	Blackwater Smooth Razor	4	2	2	.500	15.0	60	40
8	Purefoods TJ Titans	4	1	3	.250	15.0	60	35
Eliminated at the preliminary round
9	Terrafirma 3x3	2	1	1	.500	17.0	34	20
10	San Miguel Beermen	3	1	2	.333	18.7	56	18
11	Wilcon Depot 3x3	3	0	3	.000	12.3	37	16

Source: PBA 3x3

== 6th leg ==
=== Groupings ===
Pool A	Pool B	Pool C
Cavitex Braves (1); TNT Triple Giga (6); Blackwater Smooth Razor (7)	Pioneer ElastoSeal Katibays (2); Meralco Bolts 3x3 (5); Purefoods TJ Titans (8); Wilcon Depot 3x3 (11)	Barangay Ginebra San Miguel (3); NorthPort Batang Pier (4); Terrafirma 3x3 (9); San Miguel Beermen (10)

=== Preliminary round ===
==== Pool A ====
Pos	Team	Pld	W	L	PF	PA	PD	PCT	Qualification
1	Cavitex Braves	2	2	0	36	30	+6	1.000	Quarterfinals
2	TNT Triple Giga	2	1	1	38	35	+3	.500	Quarterfinals
3	Blackwater Smooth Razor	2	0	2	29	38	−9	.000	

Source: PBA 3x3
Rules for classification: 1) Wins; Win ratio if unequal number of games; 2) Head-to-head record; 3) Average points per game; 4) Higher seed.

August 7
12:35 pm

Report

TNT Triple Giga	21–16	Blackwater Smooth Razor

Trinoma

August 7
1:45 pm

Report

Cavitex Braves	17–13	Blackwater Smooth Razor

Trinoma

August 7
3:00 pm

Report

Cavitex Braves	19–17	TNT Triple Giga

Trinoma

==== Pool B ====
Pos	Team	Pld	W	L	PF	PA	PD	PCT	Qualification
1	Wilcon Depot 3x3	3	3	0	58	43	+15	1.000	Quarterfinals
2	Meralco Bolts 3x3	3	2	1	58	46	+12	.667	Quarterfinals
3	Purefoods TJ Titans	3	1	2	53	62	−9	.333	Quarterfinals
4	Pioneer ElastoSeal Katibays	3	0	3	43	61	−18	.000	

Source: PBA 3x3
Rules for classification: 1) Wins; Win ratio if unequal number of games; 2) Head-to-head record; 3) Average points per game; 4) Higher seed.

August 7
11:20 am

Report

Meralco Bolts 3x3	21–15	Purefoods TJ Titans

Trinoma

August 7
11:45 am

Report

Pioneer ElastoSeal Katibays	11–18	Wilcon Depot 3x3

Trinoma

August 7
1:25 pm

Report

Meralco Bolts 3x3	15–19	Wilcon Depot 3x3

Trinoma

August 7
2:10 pm

Report

Purefoods TJ Titans	21–20	Pioneer ElastoSeal Katibays

Trinoma

August 7
3:25 pm

Report

Pioneer ElastoSeal Katibays	12–22	Meralco Bolts 3x3

Trinoma

August 8
10:30 am

Report

Wilcon Depot 3x3	21–17	Purefoods TJ Titans

Trinoma

==== Pool C ====
Pos	Team	Pld	W	L	PF	PA	PD	PCT	Qualification
1	Barangay Ginebra San Miguel	3	3	0	57	41	+16	1.000	Quarterfinals
2	San Miguel Beermen	3	1	2	53	57	−4	.333	Quarterfinals
3	NorthPort Batang Pier	3	1	2	43	48	−5	.333 (Note: NorthPort Batang Pier 4th seed; Terrafirma 3x3 9th seed)	Quarterfinals
4	Terrafirma 3x3	3	1	2	43	50	−7	.333	

Source: PBA 3x3
Rules for classification: 1) Wins; Win ratio if unequal number of games; 2) Head-to-head record; 3) Average points per game; 4) Higher seed.
Notes:

August 7
10:30 am

Report

NorthPort Batang Pier	8–13	Terrafirma 3x3

Trinoma

August 7
10:55 am

Report

Barangay Ginebra San Miguel	21–12	San Miguel Beermen

Trinoma

August 7
12:10 pm

Report

Terrafirma 3x3	15–21	Barangay Ginebra San Miguel

Trinoma

August 7
1:00 pm

Report

NorthPort Batang Pier	21–20	San Miguel Beermen

Trinoma

August 7
2:35 pm

Report

San Miguel Beermen	21–15	Terrafirma 3x3

Trinoma

August 8
10:55 am

Report

Barangay Ginebra San Miguel	15–14	NorthPort Batang Pier

Trinoma

=== Knockout stage ===
TNT Triple Giga defeated Cavitex Braves in the finals, 21–17, to become the fifth leg winners.

==== Bracket ====
Quarterfinals
A1	Cavitex Braves	20
B3	Purefoods TJ Titans	17
C2	San Miguel Beermen	14
B2	Meralco Bolts 3x3	17
B1	Wilcon Depot 3x3	21
C3	NorthPort Batang Pier	11
C1	Barangay Ginebra San Miguel	13
A2	TNT Triple Giga	21

Semifinals
A1	Cavitex Braves	19
B2	Meralco Bolts 3x3	18
B1	Wilcon Depot 3x3	13
A2	TNT Triple Giga	21

Finals
A1	Cavitex Braves	17
A2	TNT Triple Giga	21
Third place
B2	Meralco Bolts 3x3	13
B1	Wilcon Depot 3x3	16

==== Quarterfinals ====
August 8
11:20 am

Report

Cavitex Braves	20–17	Purefoods TJ Titans

Trinoma

August 8
11:45 am

Report

Barangay Ginebra San Miguel	13–21	TNT Triple Giga

Trinoma

August 8
12:10 pm

Report

San Miguel Beermen	14–17	Meralco Bolts 3x3

Trinoma

August 8
12:35 pm

Report

Wilcon Depot 3x3	21–11	NorthPort Batang Pier

Trinoma

==== Semifinals ====
August 8
1:00 pm

Report

Cavitex Braves	19–18	Meralco Bolts 3x3

Trinoma

August 8
1:25 pm

Report

Wilcon Depot 3x3	13–21	TNT Triple Giga

Trinoma

==== Third place game ====
August 8
2:10 pm

Report

Meralco Bolts 3x3	13–16	Wilcon Depot 3x3

Trinoma

==== Finals ====
August 8
2:35 pm

Report

Cavitex Braves	17–21	TNT Triple Giga

Trinoma

=== Final standings ===
Pos	Team	Pld	W	L	PCT	AVG	PF	Tour points
1	TNT Triple Giga	5	4	1	.800	20.2	101	100
2	Cavitex Braves	5	4	1	.800	18.4	92	80
3	Wilcon Depot 3x3	6	5	1	.833	18.0	108	70
4	Meralco Bolts 3x3	6	3	3	.500	17.7	106	60
Eliminated at the quarterfinals
5	Barangay Ginebra San Miguel	4	3	1	.750	17.5	70	50
6	Purefoods TJ Titans	4	1	3	.250	17.5	70	45
7	San Miguel Beermen	4	1	3	.250	16.8	67	40
8	NorthPort Batang Pier	4	1	3	.250	13.5	54	35
Eliminated at the preliminary round
9	Terrafirma 3x3	3	1	2	.333	14.3	43	20
10	Blackwater Smooth Razor	2	0	2	.000	14.5	29	18
11	Pioneer ElastoSeal Katibays	3	0	3	.000	14.3	43	16

Source: PBA 3x3

== Legs summary ==
Pos	Team	1st leg	2nd leg	3rd leg	4th leg	5th leg	6th leg	Pts	Qualification
1	Cavitex Braves	3rd	3rd	3rd	1st	1st	2nd	490	Qualification to Grand Finals quarterfinal round
2	TNT Triple Giga	6th	9th	1st	2nd	6th	1st	390	Qualification to Grand Finals quarterfinal round
3	Barangay Ginebra San Miguel	1st	1st	7th	10th	3rd	5th	378	Qualification to Grand Finals quarterfinal round
4	Meralco Bolts 3x3	7th	2nd	6th	3rd	5th	4th	345	Qualification to Grand Finals quarterfinal round
5	San Miguel Beermen	2nd	5th	4th	5th	10th	7th	298	Qualification to Grand Finals preliminary round
6	Wilcon Depot 3x3	5th	8th	5th	4th	11th	3rd	281	Qualification to Grand Finals preliminary round
7	Pioneer ElastoSeal Katibays	8th	6th	2nd	9th	2nd	11th	276	Qualification to Grand Finals preliminary round
8	Blackwater Smooth Razor	9th	4th	8th	8th	7th	10th	208	Qualification to Grand Finals preliminary round
9	NorthPort Batang Pier	11th	11th	11th	6th	4th	8th	188	Qualification to Grand Finals preliminary round
10	Terrafirma 3x3	4th	10th	10th	7th	9th	9th	176	Qualification to Grand Finals preliminary round
11	Purefoods TJ Titans	10th	7th	9th	11th	8th	6th	174	

Source: PBA 3x3 Report

== Grand Finals ==
=== Preliminary round ===
==== Pool A ====
Pos	Team	Pld	W	L	PF	PA	PD	PCT	Qualification
1	San Miguel Beermen	2	1	1	38	30	+8	.500	Quarterfinals
2	Blackwater Smooth Razor	2	1	1	33	34	−1	.500	Quarterfinals
3	NorthPort Batang Pier	2	1	1	27	34	−7	.500	

Source: PBA 3x3
Rules for classification: 1) Wins; Win ratio if unequal number of games; 2) Head-to-head record; 3) Average points per game; 4) Higher seed.

August 13
2:00 pm

Report

San Miguel Beermen	21–10	NorthPort Batang Pier

Market! Market!

August 13
2:50 pm

Report

Blackwater Smooth Razor	13–17	NorthPort Batang Pier

Market! Market!

August 13
3:40 pm

Report

San Miguel Beermen	17–20	Blackwater Smooth Razor

Market! Market!

==== Pool B ====
Pos	Team	Pld	W	L	PF	PA	PD	PCT	Qualification
1	Wilcon Depot 3x3	2	1	1	37	33	+4	.500	Quarterfinals
2	Pioneer ElastoSeal Katibays	2	1	1	34	31	+3	.500	Quarterfinals
3	Terrafirma 3x3	2	1	1	28	35	−7	.500	

Source: PBA 3x3
Rules for classification: 1) Wins; Win ratio if unequal number of games; 2) Head-to-head record; 3) Average points per game; 4) Higher seed.

August 13
2:25 pm

Report

Wilcon Depot 3x3	21–13	Terrafirma 3x3

Market! Market!

August 13
3:15 pm

Report

Pioneer ElastoSeal Katibays	14–15	Terrafirma 3x3

Market! Market!

August 13
4:05 pm

Report

Wilcon Depot 3x3	16–20	Pioneer ElastoSeal Katibays

Market! Market!

=== Knockout stage ===
==== Bracket ====
Seed refers to the position of the team after six legs. Letter and number inside parentheses denotes the pool letter and pool position of the team, respectively, after the preliminary round of the Grand Finals.

Quarterfinals
1	Cavitex Braves	21
7 (B2)	Pioneer ElastoSeal Katibays	12
5 (A1)	San Miguel Beermen	14
4	Meralco Bolts 3x3	16
3	Barangay Ginebra San Miguel	18
6 (B1)	Wilcon Depot 3x3	14
8 (A2)	Blackwater Smooth Razor	17
2	TNT Triple Giga	21

Semifinals
1	Cavitex Braves	17
4	Meralco Bolts 3x3	16
3	Barangay Ginebra San Miguel	16
2	TNT Triple Giga	21

Finals
1	Cavitex Braves	18
2	TNT Triple Giga	21
Third place
4	Meralco Bolts 3x3	18
3	Barangay Ginebra San Miguel	14

==== Quarterfinals ====
August 13
4:30 pm

Report

San Miguel Beermen	14–16	Meralco Bolts 3x3

Market! Market!

August 13
4:55 pm

Report

Cavitex Braves	21–12	Pioneer ElastoSeal Katibays

Market! Market!

August 13
5:20 pm

Report

Blackwater Smooth Razor	17–21	TNT Triple Giga

Market! Market!

August 13
5:45 pm

Report

Barangay Ginebra San Miguel	18–14	Wilcon Depot 3x3

Market! Market!

==== Semifinals ====
August 13
6:10 pm

Report

Cavitex Braves	17–16	Meralco Bolts 3x3

Market! Market!

August 13
6:35 pm

Report

Barangay Ginebra San Miguel	16–21	TNT Triple Giga

Market! Market!

==== Third place game ====
August 13
7:20 pm

Report

Meralco Bolts 3x3	18–14	Barangay Ginebra San Miguel

Market! Market!

==== Finals ====
August 13
7:45 pm

Report

Cavitex Braves	18–21	TNT Triple Giga

Market! Market!
