= Franco Atienza =

Filipino basketball coach

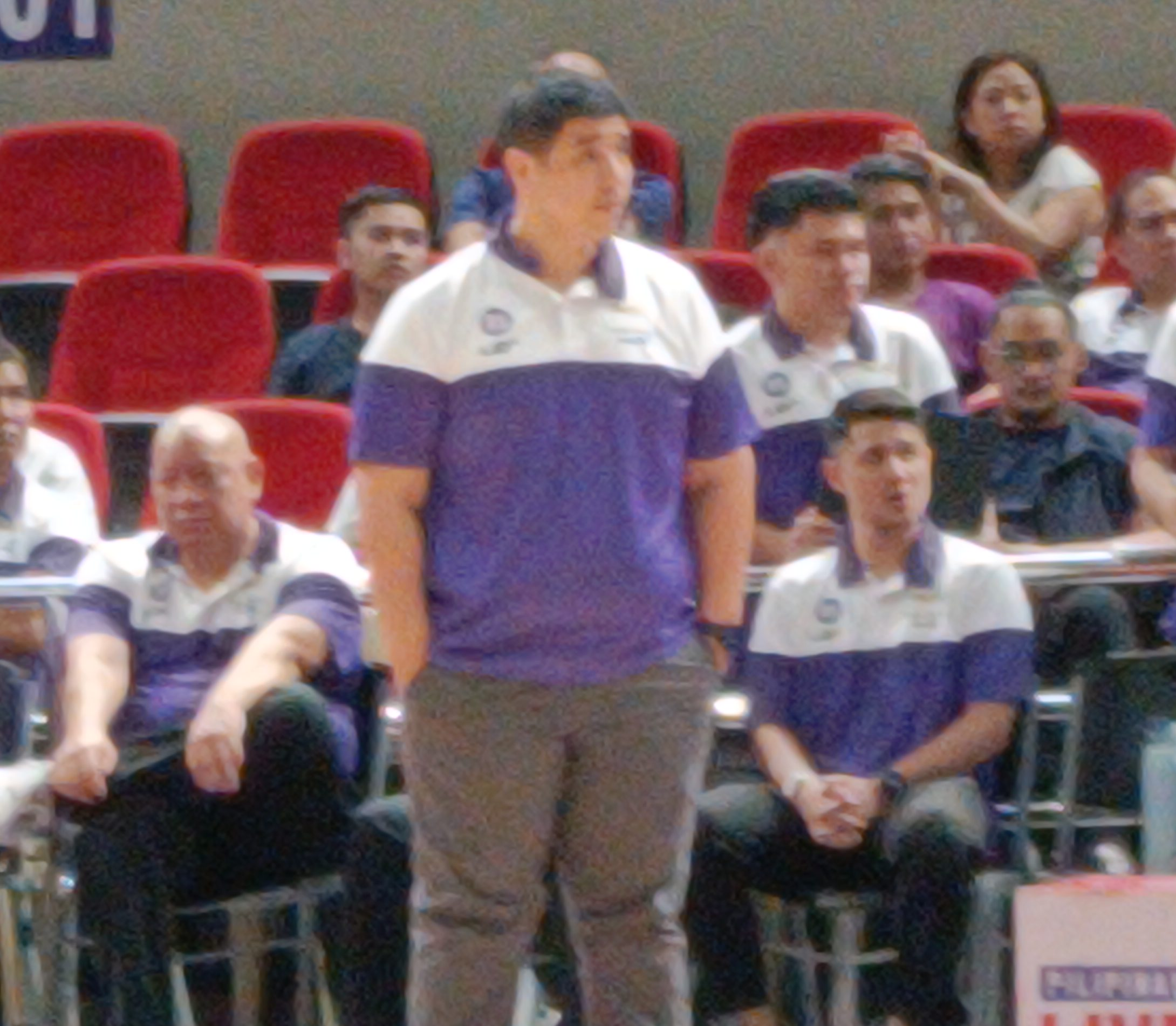
- Atienza with Converge in 2025

Converge FiberXers
- Position: Assistant coach
- League: PBA

Career information
- High school: St. John's Academy
- College: UP Diliman
- Coaching career: 2006–present

Career history

Coaching
- 2006–2009: JRU (assistant/video coordinator)
- 2007–2009: Toyota-Otis Sparks (assistant/video coordinator)
- 2009–2010: FEU (assistant/video coordinator)
- 2009–2010: Laguna Golden Lions (assistant/video coordinator)
- 2012–2013: RnW Pacific Pipes (assistant/video coordinator)
- 2012–2019: San Sebastian (assistant/video coordinator)
- 2013–2021: Alaska Aces (assistant)
- 2014–2017: San Sebastian HS
- 2022–2024: Converge FiberXers (assistant)
- 2024–2025: Converge FiberXers (interim)
- 2025–present: Converge FiberXers (assistant)

Franco Atienza is a Filipino coach who is currently an assistant coach for the Converge FiberXers in the Philippine Basketball Association (PBA).

== Career ==
Atienza started his career at JRU Heavy Bombers as assistant coach and video coordinator. He continued those roles when he served another collegiate teams like FEU Tamaraws, and San Sebastian Stags.

After collegiate stint, Atienza served as assistant coach of Alaska Aces and later with its successor franchise Converge. He later became head coach on interim basis when head coach Aldin Ayo and lead assistant McJour Luib called it quits.
