= Wilcon Depot 3x3 =

- Leagues: PBA 3x3
- Founded: 2023
- Folded: 2023
- Team colors: Green, Yellow, Red
- Company: Wilcon Depot
- Head coach: Anton Altamirano

Wilcon Depot 3x3 was a Philippine 3x3 basketball team which competed in the PBA 3x3, organized by the Philippines' top-flight professional league, Philippine Basketball Association.

== History ==
Wilcon Depot 3x3 was formally launched on June 29, 2023. It joined the first conference of the 2023 season of the PBA 3x3. This was hailed as the first participation in sports by its home and construction supplies company, Wilcon Depot Inc. The initial roster was made from the core of former team, Platinum Karaoke.

As Quezon City–Wilcon Depot, the team clinched the 2023 Chooks-To-Go Pilipinas 3x3 Quest earning a berth in the 2023 FIBA 3x3 World Tour Cebu Masters. It became the second PBA 3x3 team to qualify for a Masters-level FIBA 3x3 pro circuit tournament after TNT Triple Giga.

The team would however become defunct and was replaced by MCFASolver Tech Centrale for the second conference. The same team also took part at the Cebu Masters in lieu of Wilcon.

== Final roster ==
Wilcon Depot 3x3 roster
Players
Coaches

Pos.	No.	Nat.	Name	Ht.	Wt.	Age
		(Philippines)	Vigil, Louie	1.91 m (6 ft 3 in)	91 kg (201 lb)	34 – 26 September 1991
		(Philippines)	Andrada, Yutien
		(Philippines)	Banal, Ael
		(United States)	Datu, Keith
		(Philippines)	Tumalip, Terrence

Head coach

Emman Monfort

Legend

- (C) Team captain
- Injured
