= Converge FiberXers =

Philippine professional basketball team

- 2025–26 Converge FiberXers season
- Founded: 2022
- History: Converge FiberXers (2022–present)
- Team colors: Purple, teal, black, white
- Company: Converge ICT
- Board governor: Archen Cayabyab
- Team manager: Jacob Lao; Erwin Dotimas (assistant)
- Head coach: Dennis Pineda
- Team captain: Justine Baltazar
- Ownership: Dennis Anthony Uy

The Converge FiberXers are a professional basketball team owned by Converge ICT. The team competes in the Philippine Basketball Association (PBA). The franchise began after acquiring the former Alaska Aces franchise on March 23, 2022.

== History ==
=== Formation ===
Team logo from 2022 to 2025.

On February 16, 2022, Alaska Milk Corporation (AMC) announced that the Alaska Aces would leave the PBA at the end of the 2021 Governors' Cup. This was due to a directive by FrieslandCampina, parent company of AMC. Several companies expressed interest to buy the Aces or its franchise. The prospect company could retain the Alaska Aces team if they bought the franchise within the ongoing season. In the event the franchise was not sold within the ongoing season, the PBA would place the players in a dispersal draft.

On March 23, the PBA announced the sale of the Alaska Aces to Converge ICT. The sale was unanimously approved by the PBA Board of Governors. Smart Communications, the owner of TNT Tropang Giga and a business competitor of Converge, was noted for not blocking Converge's entry into the PBA. Former PBA commissioner Chito Salud serves as the board governor of the new team. On April 2, the team announced that Jeffrey Cariaso, who was the last head coach of the former Aces team prior to the sale of the franchise, was retained as head coach.

On April 5, Converge ICT formally unveiled their team under the name Converge FiberXers. It was also announced that the assistant coaches of the former Alaska team were retained. Erstwhile Alaska Aces board governor and team manager Richard Bachmann served as the assistant team manager of the FiberXers.

=== 2022–2024: Early seasons ===
Throughout the 2022 PBA Philippine Cup, Converge made numerous trades, bringing in young talents Tyrus Hill and David Murrell in a trade with the NLEX Road Warriors, as well as Kurt Lojera in a trade with the Blackwater Bossing which saw veteran big man Yousef Tafa depart the team. Mid-conference, Converge traded Robbie Herndon to the San Miguel Beermen in exchange for SMB's second-round picks for seasons 48 and 49 while also trading Lojera and Ben Adamos to the Phoenix Super LPG Fuel Masters for Aljun Melecio, and Kris Porter. In their first conference in the PBA, Converge finished 7th place in the elimination round with a 5–6 record. They were matched against TNT Tropang Giga, who held twice-to-beat advantage, requiring Converge to win two games back-to-back. The FiberXers lost to TNT in the first game, eliminating the team from the playoffs.

Ahead of the 2022–23 PBA Commissioner's Cup, Cariaso was released as the head coach of the team and was replaced by Aldin Ayo. Converge then made even more trades which saw Barkley Eboña join the team from Blackwater in exchange for Hill, Michael DiGregorio, and RK Ilagan. The team also brought in Jerrick Balanza in a trade with the NorthPort Batang Pier in exchange for Allyn Bulanadi. The team also signed Quincy Miller as their import for the conference. The team saw improvement in their second conference, finishing 4th with an 8–4 record. However, the team suffered another quarterfinals exit with a sweep from SMB in the best-of-three series.

For the 2023 PBA Governors' Cup, the FiberXers signed free agent Bradwyn Guinto. For a brief period, assistant coach Danny Ildefonso also joined the team due to injuries to other players. Like in their inaugural conference, Converge placed 7th and were defeated by advantage holders San Miguel Beermen in one game, yet another quarterfinals exit.

During the 2023 off-season, Converge made more moves. Among the team's acquisitions include Adrian Wong from the Magnolia Chicken Timplados Hotshots, Mike Nieto from the Rain or Shine Elasto Painters, and free agents Keith Zaldivar and Mac Tallo. Converge also drafted Schonny Winston and BJ Andrade during the PBA season 48 draft. On the other hand, the team released Maverick Ahanmisi, who has since signed with Barangay Ginebra San Miguel, Jeron Teng, and Barkley Eboña.

Despite these player moves, Converge finished both conferences in dead last after recording just three wins combined, leading to rumors of the team to be tanking to acquire the first overall pick of the PBA season 49 draft. There were also a couple of player departures during the season as Mac Tallo was terminated after playing in ligang labas, while Jerrick Balanza was traded to Magnolia for the team's second-round pick in season 49.

=== 2024–present: The youth movement ===
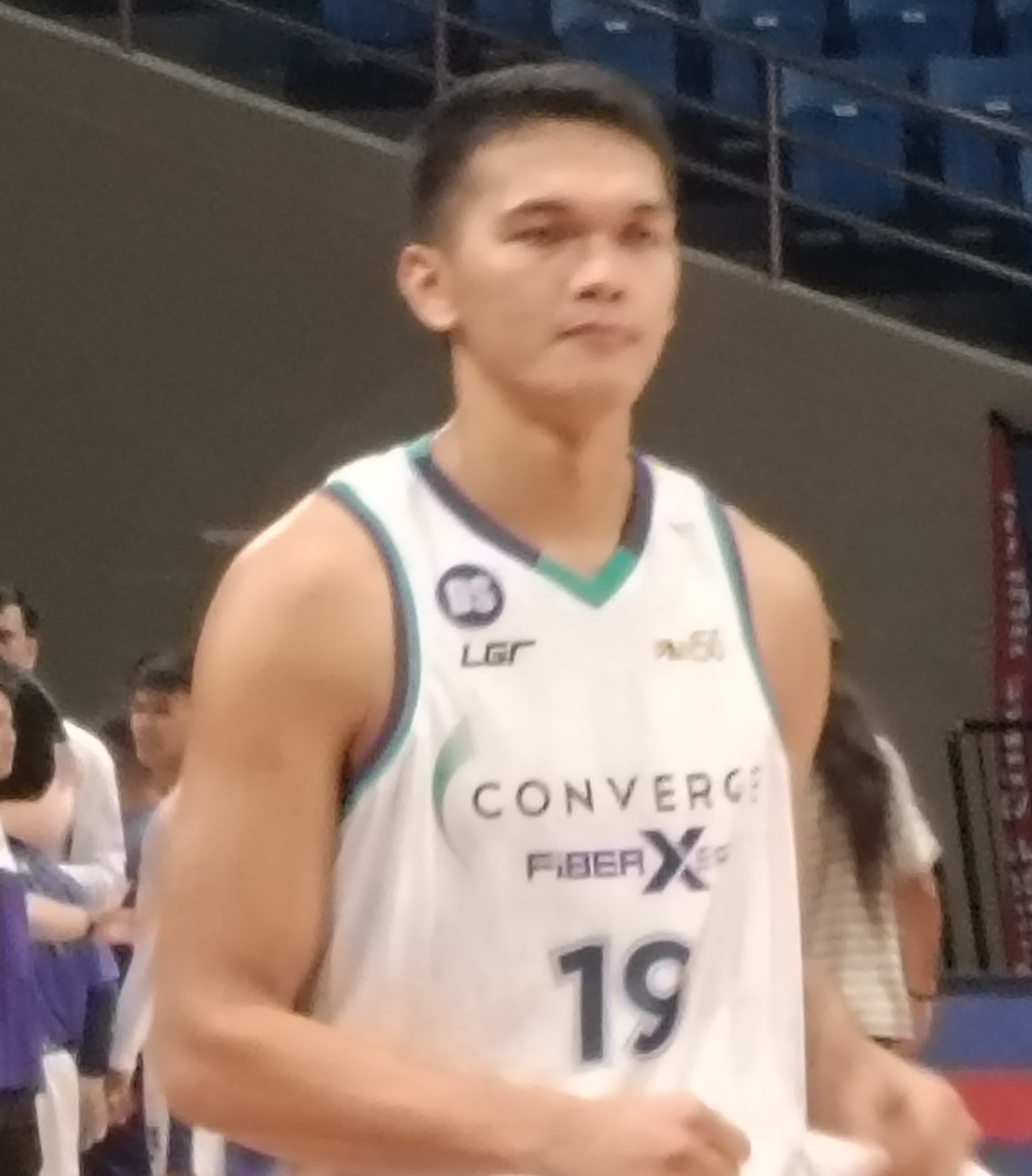
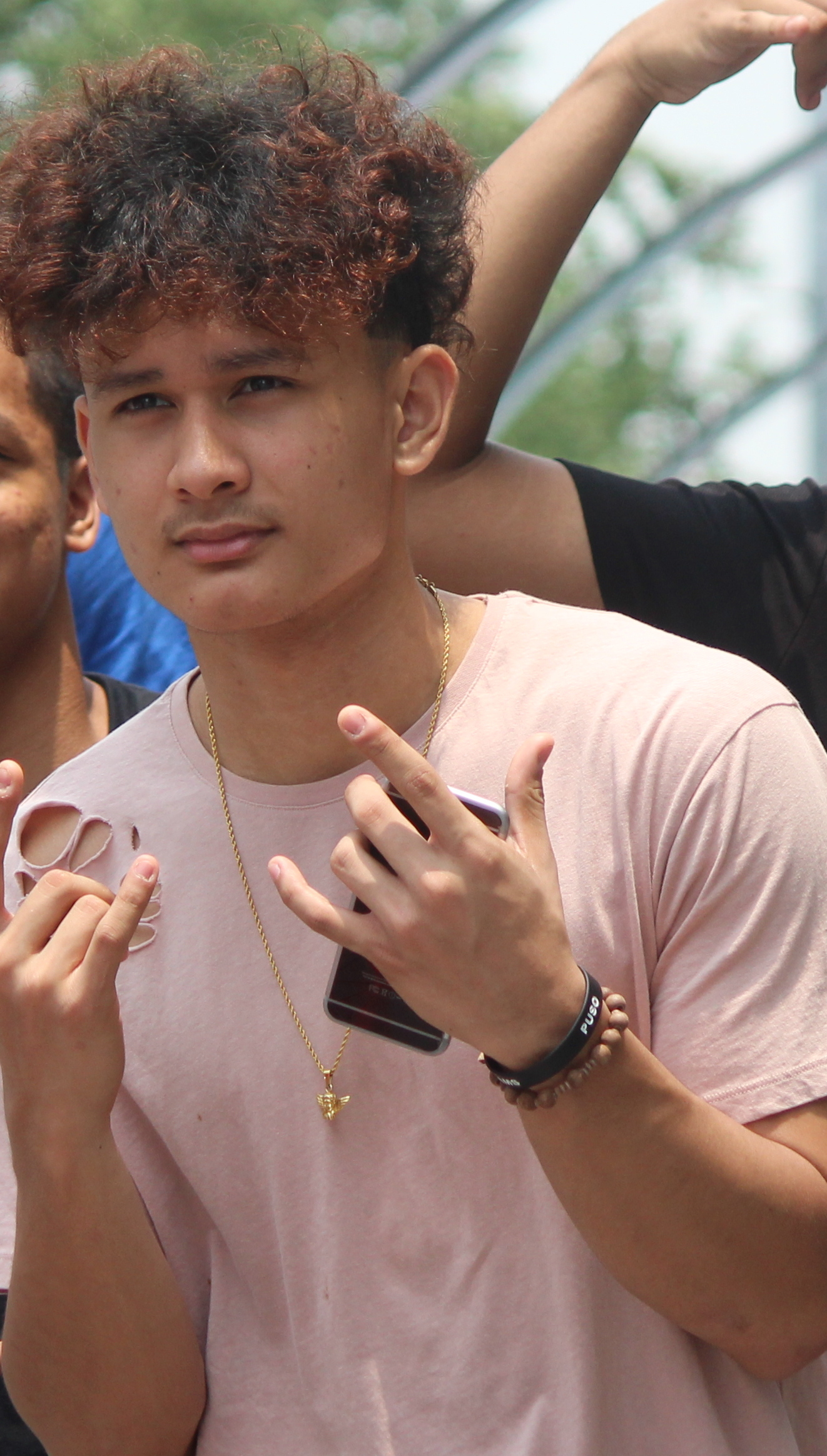
Converge utilized their draft picks in seasons 49 (2024) and 50 (2025) to select Justine Baltazar and Juan Gómez de Liaño.

In the PBA season 49 draft, Converge used their first overall pick to select Justine Baltazar. Due to his contract with the Maharlika Pilipinas Basketball League's Pampanga Giant Lanterns, he wouldn't join the team until after the 2024 MPBL season. The off-season saw a shake-up in the coaching staff as Aldin Ayo and McJour Luib resigned from their positions as head coach and lead assistant coach, respectively. Franco Atienza became interim coach while Charles Tiu joined the coaching staff. Converge also signed free agent veteran Alex Cabagnot to the team. Converge started the season by placing 3rd in Group A of the 2024 PBA Governors' Cup, but lost to the San Miguel Beermen in five games.

Ahead of the 2024–25 PBA Commissioner's Cup, the team signed Jordan Heading after acquiring his playing rights in a trade with the Terrafirma Dyip. During the conference, the team also signed MJ Garcia and acquired Rey Suerte from the Blackwater Bossing in exchange for BJ Andrade. With their new acquisitions and Baltazar's arrival, Converge had their best finish in the eliminations thus far, a third-place finish with an 8–4 record. However, the team couldn't make the semifinals after they were upset by the sixth-seeded Rain or Shine Elasto Painters in three games of the best-of-three quarterfinals.

For the 2025 PBA Philippine Cup, Converge signed free agents Jhan Nermal and Gelo Alolino. The team also traded away one of their key players in Heading for Mikey Williams, the latter was involved in a contract stalemate with the TNT Tropang 5G. While the team finished 7–4 in the conference, placing fifth meant that the team has to win back-to-back games in the quarterfinals. The team faced against Barangay Ginebra San Miguel, and were eliminated after one game.

Ahead of the 2025–26 PBA season, the FiberXers appointed Pampanga vice governor Dennis Pineda as their new head coach. Pineda was also Baltazar's coach during his time with the MPBL's Giant Lanterns. During the off-season, Converge made numerous moves to bolster their roster. Among their most notable acquisitions include the rights to Larry Muyang and Dave Ildefonso, signing long-time player Rafi Reavis, and trading for the second pick of the PBA season 50 draft, allowing the FiberXers to select Juan Gómez de Liaño.

== Current roster ==
Converge FiberXers roster
Players
Coaches

Pos.	#	POB	Name	Height	Weight	DOB (YYYY–MM–DD)	From
G	1	(Philippines)	Juan Gómez de Liaño (R)	6 ft 0 in (1.83 m)	163 lb (74 kg)	1999–11–19	Philippines
G/F	2	(Philippines)	Archie Concepcion	6 ft 2 in (1.88 m)	189 lb (86 kg)	1996–05–18	Arellano
G/F	3	(Philippines)	Jaydee Tungcab	6 ft 3 in (1.91 m)	196 lb (89 kg)	1997–05–05	Philippines
G/F	5	(United States)	Jalen Hudson (GI)	6 ft 6 in (1.98 m)	192 lb (87 kg)	1996–05–21	Florida
F	8	(Philippines)	Calvin Abueva	6 ft 3 in (1.91 m)	209 lb (95 kg)	1988–02–04	San Sebastian
G/F	9	(Philippines)	John Lloyd Clemente (R)	6 ft 3 in (1.91 m)	176 lb (80 kg)	1998–07–15	National-U
G	10	(United States)	Mikey Williams	6 ft 2 in (1.88 m)	190 lb (86 kg)	1991–10–27	Cal State Fullerton
G	11	(Philippines)	MJ Garcia	6 ft 0 in (1.83 m)		1998–11–25	SPCF
G	12	(United States)	Alec Stockton	6 ft 2 in (1.88 m)	170 lb (77 kg)	1998–06–24	Far Eastern
G	13	(Philippines)	Kurt Reyson (IN)	5 ft 10 in (1.78 m)		1998–09–08	Letran
C	15	(Philippines)	Justin Arana	6 ft 7 in (2.01 m)	231 lb (105 kg)	1999–03–21	Arellano
F	16	(Philippines)	Jonnel Policarpio	6 ft 5 in (1.96 m)		2001–12–16	De La Salle
F/C	19	(Philippines)	Justine Baltazar	6 ft 9 in (2.06 m)	250 lb (113 kg)	1997–02–19	De La Salle
C	20	(Philippines)	Larry Muyang	6 ft 6 in (1.98 m)	220 lb (100 kg)	1995–06–04	Letran
F/C	21	(Philippines)	Jhaymo Eguilos	6 ft 6 in (1.98 m)	190 lb (86 kg)	1986–08–27	Far Eastern
C	24	(Philippines)	Ronan Santos (IN)	6 ft 7 in (2.01 m)		1997–03–24	Arellano
C	27	(Philippines)	Ladis Lepalam	6 ft 9 in (2.06 m)	200 lb (91 kg)	1999–11–27	St. Benilde

Head coach

- (Philippines) Dennis Pineda

Assistant coach(es)

- (Philippines) Franco Atienza (1st assistant)
- (Philippines) Glenn Capacio
- (Philippines) Frederick Dimatulac
- (Philippines) Danny Ildefonso
- (Philippines) Willie Miller
- (Philippines) Daniel Rose
- (Philippines) Karl Santos

Team manager

- (Philippines) Jacob Lao
- (Philippines) Erwin Dotimas (assistant)

Legend

- (C) Team captain
- (CI) Commissioner's Cup Import
- (GI) Governors' Cup Import
- (EI) EASL Import
- (DP) Unsigned draft pick
- (FA) Free agent
- (IN) Inactive
- (S) Suspended
- (R) Rookie
- Injured

Roster

== Season-by-season records ==
List of the last five conferences completed by the Converge FiberXers. For the full-season history, see List of Converge FiberXers seasons.

Note: GP = Games played, W = Wins, L = Losses, W–L% = Winning percentage

Season	Conference	GP	W	L	W–L%	Finish	Playoffs
2024–25	Governors'	10	6	4	.600	3rd (Group A)	Lost in quarterfinals vs. San Miguel, 2–3
2024–25	Commissioner's	12	8	4	.667	3rd	Lost in quarterfinals vs. Rain or Shine, 1–2
2024–25	Philippine	11	7	4	.636	5th	Lost in quarterfinals vs. Barangay Ginebra**, 80–88
2025–26	Philippine	11	7	4	.636	4th	Lost in quarterfinals vs. Barangay Ginebra in two games
2025–26	Commissioner's	12	5	7	.417	9th	Did not qualify
An asterisk (*) indicates one-game playoff; two asterisks (**) indicate team with twice-to-beat advantage

== Awards ==
=== Individual awards ===
PBA Most Improved Player	PBA Rookie of the Year Award	PBA Mythical Second Team
Maverick Ahanmisi – 2022–23	Justin Arana – 2022–23	Justin Arana – 2024–25

=== PBA Press Corps Individual Awards ===
All-Rookie Team
- Justin Arana – 2022–23
- Justine Baltazar – 2024–25

=== All-Star Weekend ===
Slam Dunk Contest	PBA All-Star Selection
David Murrell – 2023	2026: Calvin Abueva; Justin Arana; Justine Baltazar; Alec Stockton

Preceded by Alaska Aces	PBA franchise lineage 2022	Succeeded by current incarnation
