= BJ Andrade =

Filipino basketball player

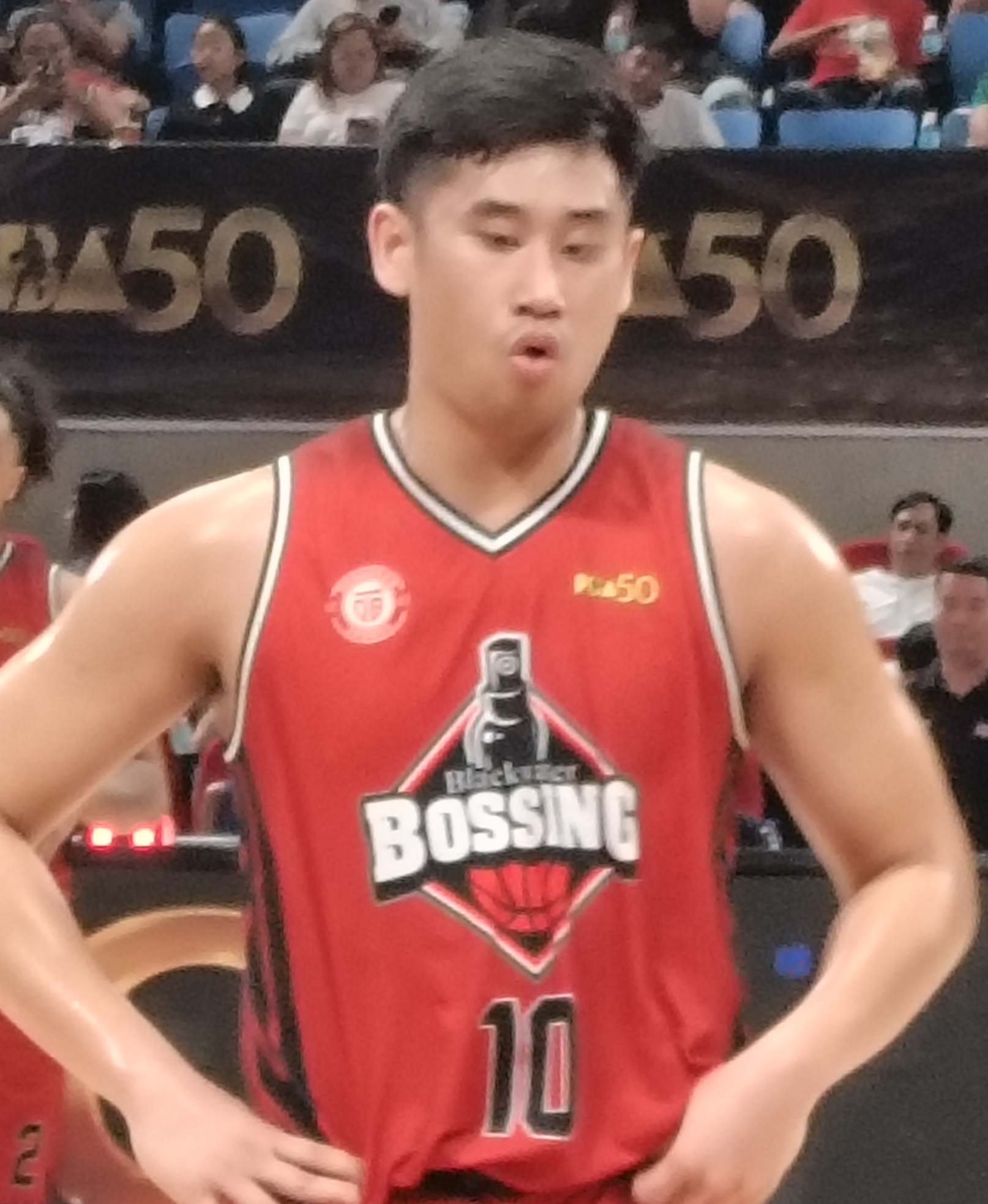
- Andrade with the Blackwater Bossing in 2025

No. 2 – Winling
- Position: Shooting guard / small forward
- League: HKA1

Personal information
- Born: July 26, 1996 (age 30) British Hong Kong
- Listed height: 6 ft 0 in (1.83 m)

Career information
- College: Ateneo
- PBA draft: 2023: 1st round, 10th overall pick
- Drafted by: Converge FiberXers

Career history
- 2023–2025: Converge FiberXers
- 2025–2026: Blackwater Bossing
- 2026–present: Winling

Career highlights
- 4× UAAP champion (2017–2019, 2022)

Bryan Jason Ildefonso Andrade (born July 26, 1996) is a Filipino professional basketball player for the Winling of the Hong Kong A1 Division Championship (HKA1).

Andrade is a four-time University Athletic Association of the Philippines (UAAP) champion with Ateneo de Manila University, playing for the Blue Eagles throughout his college career. In 2023, he was selected by the Converge FiberXers with the tenth pick of the PBA season 48 draft. In 2025, he was traded to the Blackwater Bossing.

Andrade is also the nephew of Danny Ildefonso.

== College career ==
In his entire college career, Andrade played for the Ateneo Blue Eagles. He was part of the Ateneo squad that won three consecutive championships in UAAP seasons 80 (2017), 81 (2018), and 82 (2019). In his final year with Ateneo in UAAP Season 85 (2022), he won his fourth championship.

Before declaring for the PBA draft, Andrade also had a stint with Strong Group Athletics alongside other collegiate players for the 32nd Dubai International Basketball Tournament in early 2023.

== Professional career ==
=== Converge FiberXers (2023–2025) ===
On August 26, 2023, Andrade declared for the PBA season 48 draft. During the draft, he was selected by the Converge FiberXers with the tenth overall pick, joining his uncle Danny Ildefonso in the team. On September 25, he signed a rookie contract with Converge, which reportedly lasts for two years. His debut for Converge was delayed after suffering an ACL injury which rendered him out of the 2023–24 PBA Commissioner's Cup. His debut would come during the 2024 PBA Philippine Cup in a game against the Magnolia Chicken Timplados Hotshots on March 16, 2024.

=== Blackwater Bossing (2025–2026) ===
In 2025, Converge traded Andrade to Blackwater in exchange for Rey Suerte.

While his contract was to last until September 2026, he was released by Blackwater with permission from team owner Dioceldo Sy to pursue a career overseas.

=== Winling (2026–present) ===
Andrade joined the Winling Basketball Club of the Hong Kong A1 Division Championship in July 2026. Since he was born in Hong Kong, he is considered as a local player and not subject to a player quota. He signed a three-year contract with Winling.

== PBA career statistics ==
Legend
GP	Games played	MPG	Minutes per game	FG%	Field-goal percentage
3FG%	3-point field-goal percentage	4P%	4-point field-goal percentage	FT%	Free-throw percentage
RPG	Rebounds per game	APG	Assists per game	SPG	Steals per game
BPG	Blocks per game	PPG	Points per game	127	Career high

As of the end of 2024–25 season

=== Season-by-season averages ===
Year	Team	GP	MPG	FG%	3P%	4P%	FT%	RPG	APG	SPG	BPG	PPG
2023–24	Converge	5	9.0	.300	.286	—	.000	.8	.8	.4	—	1.6
2024–25	Converge	36	13.3	.425	.378	.429	.778	1.0	.6	.3	.0	4.2
2024–25	Blackwater	36	13.3	.425	.378	.429	.778	1.0	.6	.3	.0	4.2
Career		41	12.8	.415	.370	.429	.737	1.0	.7	.3	.0	3.9
