= Mike Nieto =

Filipino basketball player

No. 14 – TNT Tropang 5G
- Position: Small forward
- League: PBA

Personal information
- Born: May 31, 1997 (age 29) Makati, Philippines
- Listed height: 6 ft 2 in (1.88 m)

Career information
- High school: Ateneo (Quezon City)
- College: Ateneo
- PBA draft: 2019: Special round, 5th overall pick
- Drafted by: Rain or Shine Elasto Painters
- Playing career: 2019–present

Career history
- 2022–2023: Rain or Shine Elasto Painters
- 2023–2025: Converge FiberXers
- 2025–present: TNT Tropang 5G

Career highlights
- 3× UAAP champion (2017, 2018, 2019); UAAP Juniors MVP (2015)

Michael Joseph L. Nieto (born May 31, 1997) is a Filipino professional basketball player for the TNT Tropang 5G of the Philippine Basketball Association (PBA). He played college basketball for the Ateneo Blue Eagles in the University Athletic Association of the Philippines (UAAP). He was drafted fifth overall during the special Gilas round of the 2019 PBA draft.

== Early life and education ==
Michael Joseph L. Nieto is the son of Jet Nieto, who played for the Ateneo Blue Eagles and won UAAP titles in 1987 and 1988. He has a twin brother, Matt, who is also a professional basketball player. During high school, he played for the Ateneo Blue Eaglets. In high school, he played the center and power forward positions and weighed 220 pounds. He won the MVP award in the juniors division during his senior year.

In college, Nieto played for the Ateneo Blue Eagles. He transitioned his game to play the guard and wing positions because he was undersized for the center position at the collegiate level. He lost over 30 pounds to adjust to his new role. He won three consecutive UAAP championships with the team. In Season 82, he served as the team captain. During that season, the team achieved a 16–0 sweep to win the title. He stated that the team exemplified the best versions of themselves to achieve that record.

== National team career ==
Nieto represented the Philippines in the 2014 FIBA U17 World Championship. He was considered a team leader who provided energy and rebounding. In 2019, he was drafted into the PBA but was loaned to the Gilas Pilipinas program. He signed a contract extension with the program in January 2021. He played for the national team during the 2021 FIBA Asia Cup Qualifiers. He also was part of the roster for the Olympic Qualifying Tournament held in Serbia.

== Professional career ==
=== Rain or Shine Elasto Painters (2022–2023) ===
Nieto was selected by the Rain or Shine Elasto Painters with the fifth pick in the special Gilas round of the 2019 PBA draft. After his contract with the national team expired in early 2022, he entered contract talks with Rain or Shine. He made his PBA debut on February 12, 2022, in a game against NorthPort Batang Pier. He scored 21 points and grabbed 8 rebounds in his first game. His performance helped end a two-game losing streak for the team. Coach Chris Gavina praised Nieto for his work ethic and effort during practice. Later that year, opposing coach Chot Reyes commended Nieto for his efficient scoring during an overtime game against TNT Tropang Giga.

=== Converge FiberXers (2023–2025) ===
In May 2023, Nieto was traded to the Converge FiberXers. Rain or Shine received two second-round draft picks for the 49th and 50th seasons in exchange. In June 2023, he signed a two-year contract extension with Converge. He was a key part of the team's rotation under head coach Aldin Ayo. He continued to contribute when Charles Tiu took over as head coach. In November 2024, he scored 11 points in a game against Terrafirma. By June 2025, Nieto was released by Converge and placed on the unrestricted free agent list. A dislocated finger had sidelined him for part of the Philippine Cup that year.

=== TNT Tropang Giga/5G (2025–present) ===
Nieto joined the TNT Tropang Giga in June 2025. He was acquired from the unrestricted free agent list after other teams did not make a move. The move reunited him with former teammate Jordan Heading. He joined the team to help with backcourt depth due to injuries to other players. In September 2025, Nieto signed a one-year contract extension with TNT. The extension was confirmed by TNT team manager Jojo Lastimosa. He agreed to the new deal ahead of the PBA's 50th season.

== Personal life ==
Nieto has a younger brother named Lebron who also plays basketball. He is known to be protective of his twin brother Matt on the court. He proposed to his longtime girlfriend, Aimee Lontok, in December 2023. The couple got married in December 2024. They had been in a relationship for nine years before getting married.
