= Systems Plus College Foundation =

Private college in Angeles, Philippines

- Dalubhasaang Pundasyon Systems Plus (Filipino)
- Former names: Systems Plus Computer Center (1985–1994); Systems Plus Computer College (1994–2004)
- Motto: Commitment to Excellence
- Type: Private, Non-Sectarian
- Established: 1985; 41 years ago
- Religious affiliation: Nonsectarian
- President: Lourdes Bustamante
- Administrative staff: Approx. 1000
- Students: Approx. 18,000 (basic and higher education)
- Location: Sta Isabel Building, Balibago, Angeles City, Pampanga, Philippines; 15°09′30″N 120°35′38″E
- Campus: Urban Main: McArthur Highway, Balibago, Angeles City
- Alma Mater song: SPCnian Hymn
- Colors: Blue and White
- Nickname: SPCF Blue Panthers
- Mascot: Panther
- Website: www.spcf.edu.ph
- Location in Luzon Location in the Philippines

Systems Plus College Foundation (SPCF) is a private, non-Sectarian basic and higher education institution in Angeles, Pampanga, Philippines.

== History ==
On June 27, 1985 at Santa Isabel Building in Balibago, Angeles, five persons came together and formed Systems Plus Inc. (SPI). The primary purpose of forming this organization was to conduct seminars for those who were planning to enter the electronic data processing as programmers, encoders and system analysts.

Tutorial programs for students and professionals started at the institution on July 7, 1985. This date also served as the school's foundation day.

In subsequent years, Systems Plus Inc. saw increased enrollment. In June 1987, the institution started offering associate courses and later on, bachelor's degree and graduate degree programs.

In response to growing enrollment, the institution opened four campuses in Cubao, Caloocan, San Fernando and an extension campus along Miranda Street in Angeles City.

On Apr 12, 2024, SPCF Team spcF.coMeLex won third place in the third iTHINK Hackathon organized by the ISLA Camp (ICP HUB Philippines), held during the International Conference on Innovation, Technology, and Entrepreneurship (IRCITE) 2024. Its Web3 developer participants's Attend.ly introduced the innovative blockchain mobile app that incentivizes student engagement and simplifies attendance management.

== San Fernando Campus ==
A few years later, another campus in the San Fernando, Pampanga was opened to accommodate the fast growing student population.

In June 2004, the name of the school was once again changed from Systems Plus Computer College to Systems Plus College Foundation (SPCF), Inc. with the adoption of a new school logo. This was to align itself with the expected growth and development,

The Commission on Higher Education Regional Office has awarded the Center of Development in Information Technology designation to the school.

== Gallery ==
Systems Plus College Facade

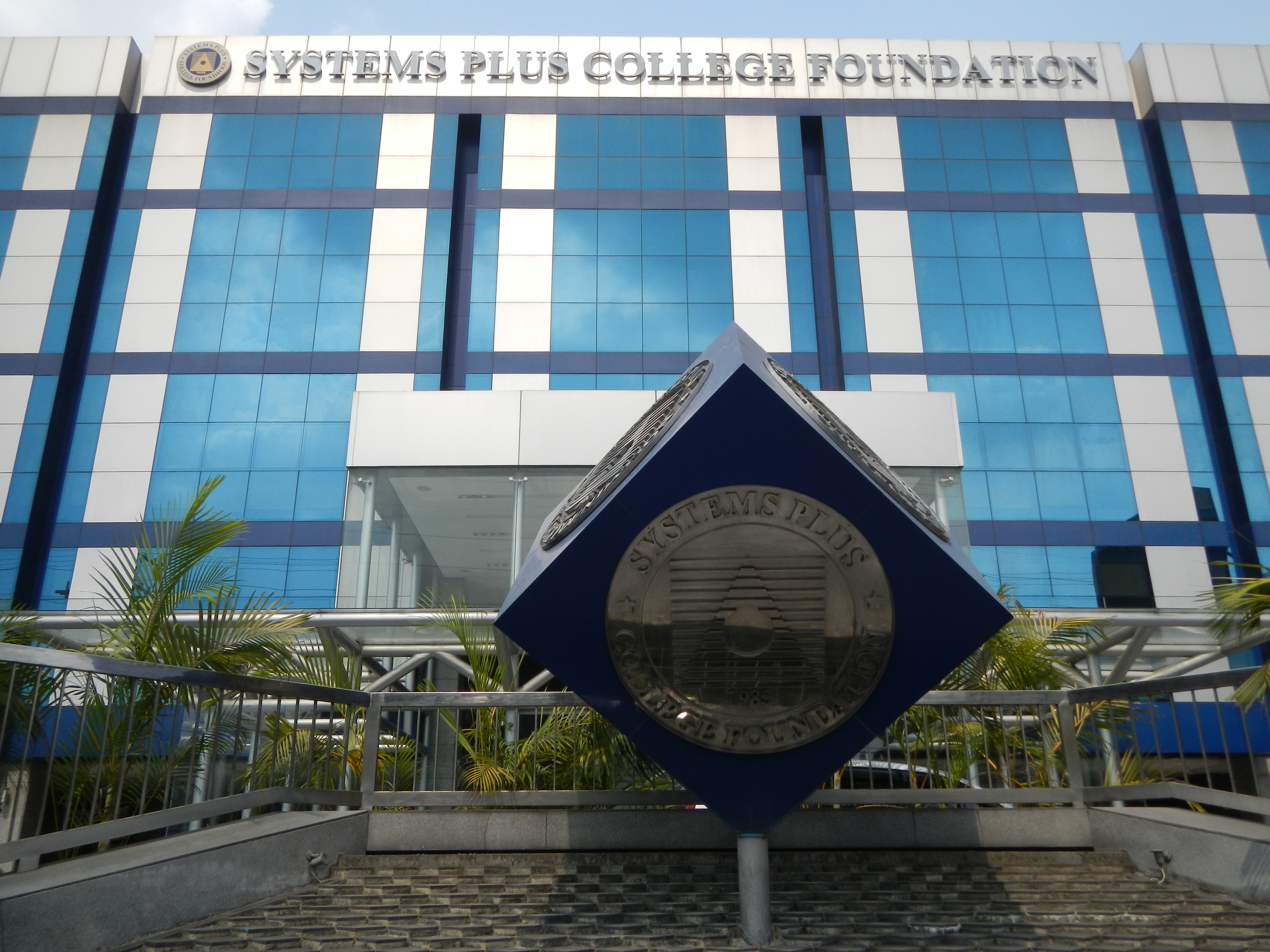
Center facade

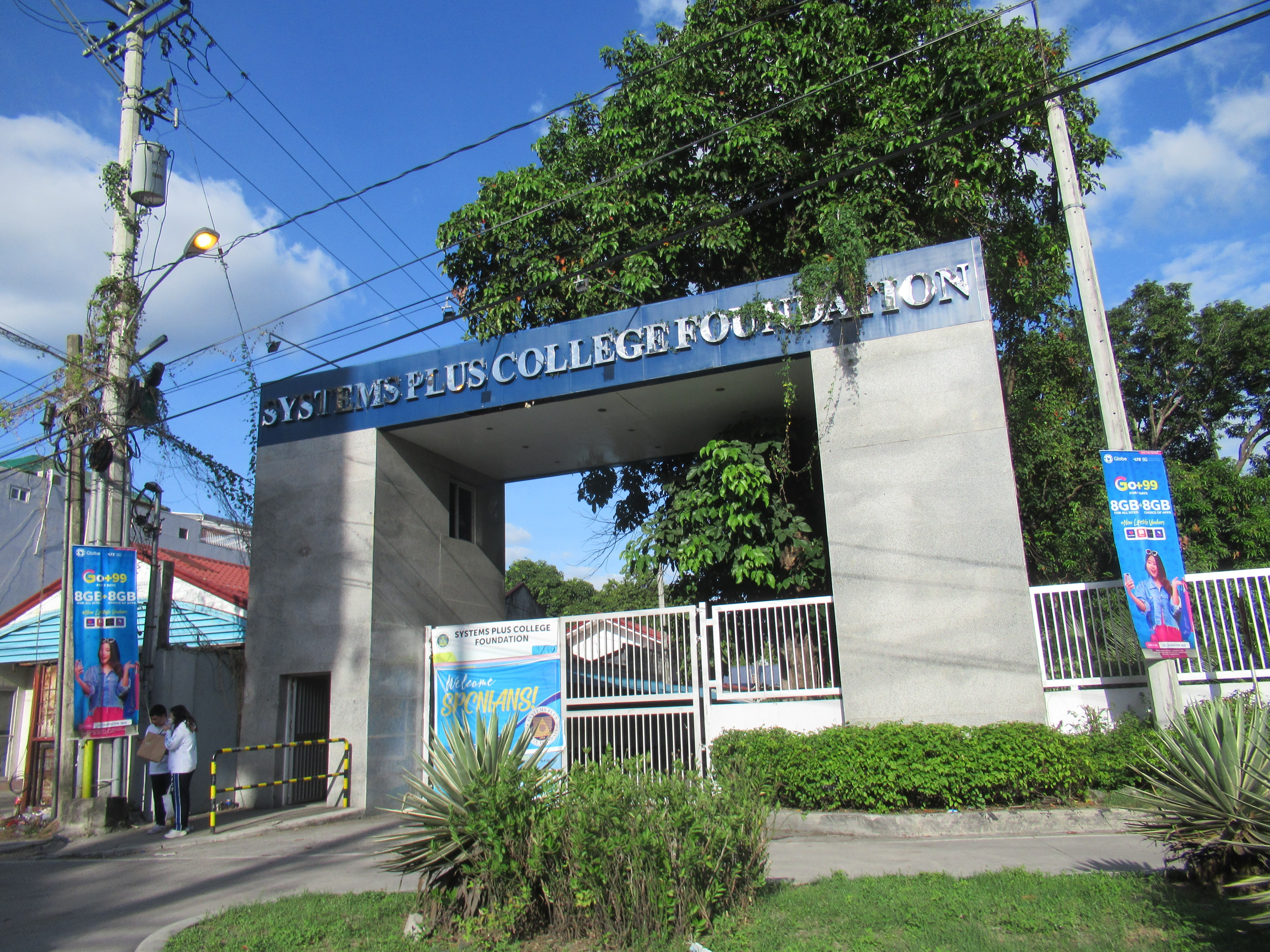
Main gate

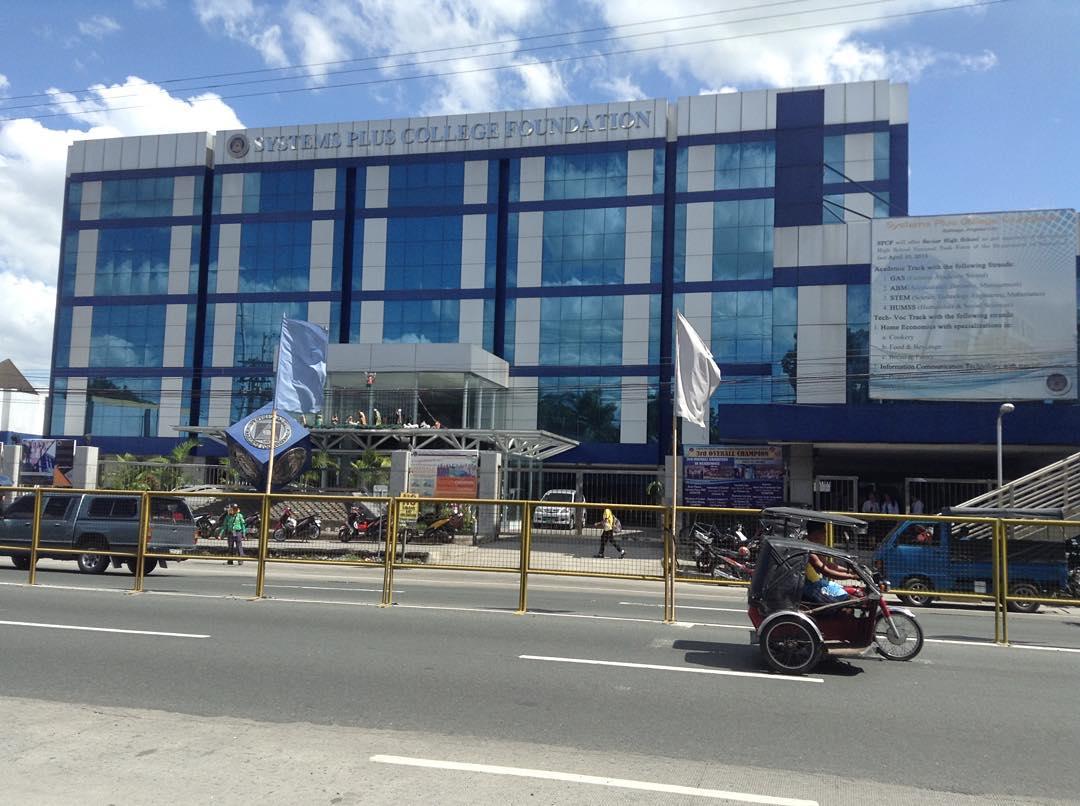
Facade of the Systems Plus College Foundation, taken December 2015

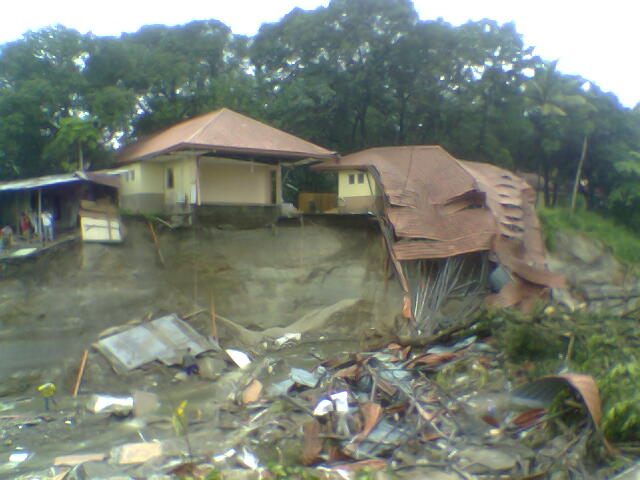
Destruction of classroom buildings along the bankside of a waterway
