= 2021 PBA 3x3 season – Third conference =

Third conference of the 2021 PBA 3x3 season

The third conference of the 2021 PBA 3x3 season started on May 21, 2022, and ended on July 3, 2022. It consisted of six two-day legs and a grand final. TNT Tropang Giga became the conference's Grand Champion after defeating Purefoods TJ Titans in the Grand Finals, 21–19.

== Teams ==
The players listed have played in at least one of the legs. The Zamboanga Valientes returned this conference after taking a leave of absence during the second conference.

| Team | Players | | | | | |
|---|---|---|---|---|---|---|
| Barangay Ginebra San Miguel | Mikey Cabahug | Leo de Vera | Martin Gozum | Dennice Villamor | Daniel de Joya | Allen Enriquez |
| Cavitex Braves | Bong Galanza | Prince Rivero | AC Soberano | Tzaddy Rangel | Dominick Fajardo | Chester Saldua |
| Limitless Appmasters | Reymar Caduyac | Jorey Napoles | Nico Salva | Alfrancis Tamsi | Simon Camacho | Daryl Pascual |
| Master Sardines Fishing Champs | Gwyne Capacio | Jeff Javillonar | John Derico Lopez | Jeric Teng | Thomas Torres | Dave Moralde |
| Meralco Bolts 3x3 | Alfred Batino | Dexter Maiquez | Maclean Sabellina | Joseph Sedurifa | Tonino Gonzaga | John Jeryl Española |
| NorthPort Batang Pier | Luke Parcero | LA Revilla | Joshua Webb | Dexter Zamora | | |
| Pioneer Pro Tibay | Gian Abrigo | Christian Rivera | Robin Roño | Reeve Ugsang | Carlo Escalambre | Carlo de Chavez |
| Platinum Karaoke | JR Alabanza | Yutien Andrada | Hyram Bagatsing | Chris de Chavez | Raphael Banal | |
| Purefoods TJ Titans | Jun Bonsubre | Joseph Eriobu | Paolo Javelona | Jed Mendoza | Val Acuña | Marvin Hayes |
| San Miguel Beermen | Ken Bono | Wendell Comboy | Riego Gamalinda | James Mangahas | Alfonzo Gotladera | Jeff Manday |
| Sista Super Sealers | Jamil Gabawan | Jan Jamon | Joseph Manlangit | Kenneth Mocon | Wilson Baltazar | Rhaffy Octobre |
| Terrafirma 3x3 | Shaq Alanes | Jebb Bulawan | Sandy Ceñal | Jeremiah Taladua | Red Cachuela | |
| TNT Tropang Giga | Samboy de Leon | Chris Exciminiano | Gryann Mendoza | Almond Vosotros | Lervin Flores | Rey Mark Acuno |
| Zamboanga Valientes | Darwish Bederi | Jeffry Bernardo | Jerom Ferrer | Reed Juntilla | Job Alcantara | Rodel Vaygan |

== 1st leg ==
=== Groupings ===
The preliminary drawing of lots was held on May 18, 2022.

| Pool A | Pool B | Pool C | Pool D |
|---|---|---|---|
| Barangay Ginebra San Miguel; Terrafirma 3x3 TNT Tropang Giga; Zamboanga Valientes | Meralco Bolts 3x3 Pioneer Pro Tibay; Sista Super Sealers | Cavitex Braves; Limitless Appmasters; Master Sardines Fishing Champs; Purefoods TJ Titans | NorthPort Batang Pier; Platinum Karaoke; San Miguel Beermen |

=== Preliminary round ===
==== Pool A ====
| Pos | Team | Pld | W | L | PF | PA | PD | PCT | Qualification |
|---|---|---|---|---|---|---|---|---|---|
| 1 | TNT Tropang Giga | 3 | 3 | 0 | 63 | 43 | +20 | 1.000 | Quarterfinals |
| 2 | Barangay Ginebra San Miguel | 3 | 2 | 1 | 57 | 54 | +3 | .667 | Quarterfinals |
| 3 | Terrafirma 3x3 | 3 | 1 | 2 | 53 | 60 | −7 | .333 | |
| 4 | Zamboanga Valientes | 3 | 0 | 3 | 47 | 63 | −16 | .000 | |

Source: PBA 3x3
Rules for classification: 1) Wins; Win ratio if unequal number of games; 2) Head-to-head record; 3) Average points per game; 4) Higher seed.

May 21, 2022
10:00 am

Report

| Terrafirma 3x3 | 20–21 | Barangay Ginebra San Miguel |

Robinsons Magnolia

May 21, 2022
10:25 am

Report

| TNT Tropang Giga | 21–16 | Zamboanga Valientes |

Robinsons Magnolia

May 21, 2022
12:30 pm

Report

| TNT Tropang Giga | 21–12 | Terrafirma 3x3 |

Robinsons Magnolia

May 21, 2022
12:55 pm

Report

| Zamboanga Valientes | 13–21 | Barangay Ginebra San Miguel |

Robinsons Magnolia

May 21, 2022
2:35 pm

Report

| Barangay Ginebra San Miguel | 15–21 | TNT Tropang Giga |

Robinsons Magnolia

May 22, 2022
10:00 am

Report

| Terrafirma 3x3 | 21–18 | Zamboanga Valientes |

Robinsons Magnolia

==== Pool B ====
| Pos | Team | Pld | W | L | PF | PA | PD | PCT | Qualification |
|---|---|---|---|---|---|---|---|---|---|
| 1 | Meralco Bolts 3x3 | 2 | 2 | 0 | 40 | 26 | +14 | 1.000 | Quarterfinals |
| 2 | Sista Super Sealers | 2 | 1 | 1 | 26 | 37 | −11 | .500 | Quarterfinals |
| 3 | Pioneer Pro Tibay | 2 | 0 | 2 | 34 | 37 | −3 | .000 | |

Source: PBA 3x3
Rules for classification: 1) Wins; Win ratio if unequal number of games; 2) Head-to-head record; 3) Average points per game; 4) Higher seed.

May 21, 2022
10:50 am

Report

| Pioneer Pro Tibay | 16–18 | Sista Super Sealers |

Robinsons Magnolia

May 21, 2022
1:20 pm

Report

| Meralco Bolts 3x3 | 21–8 | Sista Super Sealers |

Robinsons Magnolia

May 22, 2022
10:25 am

Report

| Meralco Bolts 3x3 | 19–18 | Pioneer Pro Tibay |

Robinsons Magnolia

==== Pool C ====
| Pos | Team | Pld | W | L | PF | PA | PD | PCT | Qualification |
|---|---|---|---|---|---|---|---|---|---|
| 1 | Purefoods TJ Titans | 3 | 3 | 0 | 61 | 49 | +12 | 1.000 | Quarterfinals |
| 2 | Cavitex Braves | 3 | 2 | 1 | 54 | 39 | +15 | .667 | Quarterfinals |
| 3 | Limitless Appmasters | 3 | 1 | 2 | 45 | 56 | −11 | .333 | |
| 4 | Master Sardines Fishing Champs | 3 | 0 | 3 | 47 | 63 | −16 | .000 | |

Source: PBA 3x3
Rules for classification: 1) Wins; Win ratio if unequal number of games; 2) Head-to-head record; 3) Average points per game; 4) Higher seed.

May 21, 2022
11:15 am

Report

| Purefoods TJ Titans | 21–12 | Cavitex Braves |

Robinsons Magnolia

May 21, 2022
11:40 am

Report

| Limitless Appmasters | 21–16 | Master Sardines Fishing Champs |

Robinsons Magnolia

May 21, 2022
1:45 pm

Report

| Purefoods TJ Titans | 21–19 | Master Sardines Fishing Champs |

Robinsons Magnolia

May 21, 2022
3:00 pm

Report

| Master Sardines Fishing Champs | 12–21 | Cavitex Braves |

Robinsons Magnolia

May 21, 2022
3:25 pm

Report

| Limitless Appmasters | 18–19 | Purefoods TJ Titans |

Robinsons Magnolia

May 22, 2022
10:50 am

Report

| Cavitex Braves | 21–6 | Limitless Appmasters |

Robinsons Magnolia

==== Pool D ====
| Pos | Team | Pld | W | L | PF | PA | PD | PCT | Qualification |
|---|---|---|---|---|---|---|---|---|---|
| 1 | Platinum Karaoke | 2 | 2 | 0 | 38 | 29 | +9 | 1.000 | Quarterfinals |
| 2 | San Miguel Beermen | 2 | 1 | 1 | 37 | 35 | +2 | .500 | Quarterfinals |
| 3 | NorthPort Batang Pier | 2 | 0 | 2 | 31 | 42 | −11 | .000 | |

Source: PBA 3x3
Rules for classification: 1) Wins; Win ratio if unequal number of games; 2) Head-to-head record; 3) Average points per game; 4) Higher seed.

May 21, 2022
12:05 pm

Report

| Platinum Karaoke | 21–13 | NorthPort Batang Pier |

Robinsons Magnolia

May 21, 2022
2:10 pm

Report

| San Miguel Beermen | 21–18 | NorthPort Batang Pier |

Robinsons Magnolia

May 22, 2022
11:15 am

Report

| Platinum Karaoke | 17–16 | San Miguel Beermen |

Robinsons Magnolia

=== Knockout stage ===
TNT Tropang Giga defeated Barangay Ginebra San Miguel in the finals, 18–15, to become the first leg winners.

==== Bracket ====
Quarterfinals
A1 | TNT Tropang Giga | 21
D2 | San Miguel Beermen | 18
C1 | Purefoods TJ Titans | 18
B2 | Sista Super Sealers | 17
B1 | Meralco Bolts 3x3 | 19
C2 | Cavitex Braves | 17
D1 | Platinum Karaoke | 20
A2 | Barangay Ginebra San Miguel | 21

Semifinals
A1 | TNT Tropang Giga | 21
C1 | Purefoods TJ Titans | 13
B1 | Meralco Bolts 3x3 | 10
A2 | Barangay Ginebra San Miguel | 13

Finals
A1 | TNT Tropang Giga | 18
A2 | Barangay Ginebra San Miguel | 15
Third place
C1 | Purefoods TJ Titans | 19
B1 | Meralco Bolts 3x3 | 17

==== Quarterfinals ====
May 22, 2022
11:40 am

Report

| Purefoods TJ Titans | 18–17 | Sista Super Sealers |

Robinsons Magnolia

May 22, 2022
12:05 pm

Report

| Meralco Bolts 3x3 | 19–17 | Cavitex Braves |

Robinsons Magnolia

May 22, 2022
12:30 pm

Report

| TNT Tropang Giga | 21–18 | San Miguel Beermen |

Robinsons Magnolia

May 22, 2022
12:55 pm

Report

| Platinum Karaoke | 20–21 | Barangay Ginebra San Miguel |

Robinsons Magnolia

==== Semifinals ====
May 22, 2022
1:20 pm

Report

| TNT Tropang Giga | 21–13 | Purefoods TJ Titans |

Robinsons Magnolia

May 22, 2022
1:45 pm

Report

| Meralco Bolts 3x3 | 10–13 | Barangay Ginebra San Miguel |

Robinsons Magnolia

==== Third place game ====
May 22, 2022
2:25 pm

Report

| Purefoods TJ Titans | 19–17 | Meralco Bolts 3x3 |

Robinsons Magnolia

==== Finals ====
May 22, 2022
2:50 pm

Report

| TNT Tropang Giga | 18–15 | Barangay Ginebra San Miguel |

Robinsons Magnolia

=== Final standings ===
| Pos | Team | Pld | W | L | PCT | AVG | PF | Tour points |
|---|---|---|---|---|---|---|---|---|
| 1 | TNT Tropang Giga | 6 | 6 | 0 | 1.000 | 20.5 | 123 | 100 |
| 2 | Barangay Ginebra San Miguel | 6 | 4 | 2 | .667 | 17.7 | 106 | 80 |
| 3 | Purefoods TJ Titans | 6 | 5 | 1 | .833 | 18.5 | 111 | 70 |
| 4 | Meralco Bolts 3x3 | 5 | 3 | 2 | .600 | 17.2 | 86 | 60 |
Eliminated at the quarterfinals
| 5 | Platinum Karaoke | 3 | 2 | 1 | .667 | 19.3 | 58 | 50 |
| 6 | Cavitex Braves | 4 | 2 | 2 | .500 | 17.8 | 71 | 45 |
| 7 | San Miguel Beermen | 3 | 1 | 2 | .333 | 18.3 | 55 | 40 |
| 8 | Sista Super Sealers | 3 | 1 | 2 | .333 | 14.3 | 43 | 35 |
Eliminated at the preliminary round
| 9 | Terrafirma 3x3 | 3 | 1 | 2 | .333 | 17.7 | 53 | 20 |
| 10 | Limitless Appmasters | 3 | 1 | 2 | .333 | 15.0 | 45 | 18 |
| 11 | Pioneer Pro Tibay | 2 | 0 | 2 | .000 | 17.0 | 34 | 16 |
| 12 | Zamboanga Valientes | 3 | 0 | 3 | .000 | 15.7 | 47 | 14 |
| 13 | Master Sardines Fishing Champs | 3 | 0 | 3 | .000 | 15.7 | 47 | 12 |
| 14 | NorthPort Batang Pier | 2 | 0 | 2 | .000 | 15.5 | 31 | 11 |

Source: PBA 3x3

== 2nd leg ==
=== Groupings ===
| Pool A | Pool B | Pool C | Pool D |
|---|---|---|---|
| TNT Tropang Giga (1); Sista Super Sealers (8); Terrafirma 3x3 (9); NorthPort Batang Pier (14) | Barangay Ginebra San Miguel (2); San Miguel Beermen (7); Limitless Appmasters (10) | Purefoods TJ Titans (3); Cavitex Braves (6); Pioneer Pro Tibay (11); Master Sardines Fishing Champs (13) | Meralco Bolts 3x3 (4); Platinum Karaoke (5); Zamboanga Valientes (12) |

=== Preliminary round ===
==== Pool A ====
| Pos | Team | Pld | W | L | PF | PA | PD | PCT | Qualification |
|---|---|---|---|---|---|---|---|---|---|
| 1 | TNT Tropang Giga | 3 | 2 | 1 | 59 | 46 | +13 | .667 (Note: TNT Tropang Giga 19.7 avg. points; Terrafirma 3x3 19.3 avg. points; NorthPort Batang Pier 15.3 avg. points) | Quarterfinals |
| 2 | Terrafirma 3x3 | 3 | 2 | 1 | 58 | 55 | +3 | .667 | Quarterfinals |
| 3 | NorthPort Batang Pier | 3 | 2 | 1 | 46 | 49 | −3 | .667 | |
| 4 | Sista Super Sealers | 3 | 0 | 3 | 44 | 57 | −13 | .000 | |

Source: PBA 3x3
Rules for classification: 1) Wins; Win ratio if unequal number of games; 2) Head-to-head record; 3) Average points per game; 4) Higher seed.
Notes:

May 28, 2022
10:00 am

Report

| TNT Tropang Giga | 21–8 | NorthPort Batang Pier |

Robinsons Place Las Piñas

May 28, 2022
10:25 am

Report

| Sista Super Sealers | 17–19 | Terrafirma 3x3 |

Robinsons Place Las Piñas

May 28, 2022
12:30 pm

Report

| Terrafirma 3x3 | 21–17 | TNT Tropang Giga |

Robinsons Place Las Piñas

May 28, 2022
12:55 pm

Report

| Sista Super Sealers | 10–17 | NorthPort Batang Pier |

Robinsons Place Las Piñas

May 29, 2022 (Note: This game was initially scheduled on May 28, but was moved to the following day due to technical problems on the flooring during the Pool D game between Meralco Bolts 3x3 and Platinum Karaoke, which was halted at the 8:18 mark, with Platinum Karaoke leading 4–3.)
10:25 am

Report

| NorthPort Batang Pier | 21–18 | Terrafirma 3x3 |

Robinsons Place Las Piñas

May 29, 2022
11:15 am

Report

| TNT Tropang Giga | 21–17 | Sista Super Sealers |

Robinsons Place Las Piñas

==== Pool B ====
| Pos | Team | Pld | W | L | PF | PA | PD | PCT | Qualification |
|---|---|---|---|---|---|---|---|---|---|
| 1 | Limitless Appmasters | 2 | 1 | 1 | 41 | 33 | +8 | .500 (Note: Limitless Appmasters 20.5 avg. points; Barangay Ginebra San Miguel 19.5 avg. points; San Miguel Beermen 16.5 avg. points) | Quarterfinals |
| 2 | Barangay Ginebra San Miguel | 2 | 1 | 1 | 39 | 41 | −2 | .500 | Quarterfinals |
| 3 | San Miguel Beermen | 2 | 1 | 1 | 33 | 39 | −6 | .500 | |

Updated to match(es) played on complet. Source: PBA 3x3
Rules for classification: 1) Wins; Win ratio if unequal number of games; 2) Head-to-head record; 3) Average points per game; 4) Higher seed.
Notes:

May 28, 2022
10:50 am

Report

| Barangay Ginebra San Miguel | 21–20 | Limitless Appmasters |

Robinsons Place Las Piñas

May 28, 2022
1:20 pm

Report

| San Miguel Beermen | 12–21 | Limitless Appmasters |

Robinsons Place Las Piñas

May 29, 2022
11:40 am

Report

| Barangay Ginebra San Miguel | 18–21 | San Miguel Beermen |

Robinsons Place Las Piñas

==== Pool C ====
| Pos | Team | Pld | W | L | PF | PA | PD | PCT | Qualification |
|---|---|---|---|---|---|---|---|---|---|
| 1 | Purefoods TJ Titans | 3 | 3 | 0 | 63 | 52 | +11 | 1.000 | Quarterfinals |
| 2 | Cavitex Braves | 3 | 1 | 2 | 55 | 53 | +2 | .333 (Note: Cavitex Braves 18.3 avg. points; Pioneer Pro Tibay 17.3 avg. points; Master Sardines Fishing Champs 16.0 avg. points) | Quarterfinals |
| 3 | Pioneer Pro Tibay | 3 | 1 | 2 | 52 | 56 | −4 | .333 | |
| 4 | Master Sardines Fishing Champs | 3 | 1 | 2 | 48 | 57 | −9 | .333 | |

Source: PBA 3x3
Rules for classification: 1) Wins; Win ratio if unequal number of games; 2) Head-to-head record; 3) Average points per game; 4) Higher seed.
Notes:

May 28, 2022
11:15 am

Report

| Purefoods TJ Titans | 21–18 | Cavitex Braves |

Robinsons Place Las Piñas

May 28, 2022
11:40 am

Report

| Master Sardines Fishing Champs | 18–16 | Pioneer Pro Tibay |

Robinsons Place Las Piñas

May 28, 2022
1:45 pm

Report

| Purefoods TJ Titans | 21–16 | Master Sardines Fishing Champs |

Robinsons Place Las Piñas

May 28, 2022
2:10 pm

Report

| Cavitex Braves | 17–18 | Pioneer Pro Tibay |

Robinsons Place Las Piñas

May 29, 2022
10:50 am

Report

| Cavitex Braves | 20–14 | Master Sardines Fishing Champs |

Robinsons Place Las Piñas

May 29, 2022
12:05 pm

Report

| Pioneer Pro Tibay | 18–21 | Purefoods TJ Titans |

Robinsons Place Las Piñas

==== Pool D ====
| Pos | Team | Pld | W | L | PF | PA | PD | PCT | Qualification |
|---|---|---|---|---|---|---|---|---|---|
| 1 | Platinum Karaoke | 2 | 2 | 0 | 38 | 26 | +12 | 1.000 | Quarterfinals |
| 2 | Meralco Bolts 3x3 | 2 | 1 | 1 | 34 | 30 | +4 | .500 | Quarterfinals |
| 3 | Zamboanga Valientes | 2 | 0 | 2 | 26 | 42 | −16 | .000 | |

Source: PBA 3x3
Rules for classification: 1) Wins; Win ratio if unequal number of games; 2) Head-to-head record; 3) Average points per game; 4) Higher seed.

May 28, 2022
12:05 pm

Report

| Zamboanga Valientes | 13–21 | Platinum Karaoke |

Robinsons Place Las Piñas

May 29, 2022
10:00 am

Report

| Meralco Bolts 3x3 | 13–17 | Platinum Karaoke |

Robinsons Place Las Piñas

May 29, 2022
12:30 pm

Report

| Meralco Bolts 3x3 | 21–13 | Zamboanga Valientes |

Robinsons Place Las Piñas

=== Knockout stage ===
Meralco Bolts 3x3 defeated Cavitex Braves in the finals, 18–17, to become the second leg winners.

==== Bracket ====
Quarterfinals
A1 | TNT Tropang Giga | 17
D2 | Meralco Bolts 3x3 | 18
C1 | Purefoods TJ Titans | 13
B2 | Barangay Ginebra San Miguel | 21
B1 | Limitless Appmasters | 20
C2 | Cavitex Braves | 21
D1 | Platinum Karaoke | 16
A2 | Terrafirma 3x3 | 20

Semifinals
D2 | Meralco Bolts 3x3 | 19
B2 | Barangay Ginebra San Miguel | 15
C2 | Cavitex Braves | 22
A2 | Terrafirma 3x3 | 11

Finals
D2 | Meralco Bolts 3x3 | 18
C2 | Cavitex Braves | 17
Third place
B2 | Barangay Ginebra San Miguel | 20
A2 | Terrafirma 3x3 | 19

==== Quarterfinals ====
May 29, 2022
12:55 pm

Report

| Purefoods TJ Titans | 13–21 | Barangay Ginebra San Miguel |

Robinsons Place Las Piñas

May 29, 2022
1:20 pm

Report

| Limitless Appmasters | 20–21 | `Cavitex Braves |

Robinsons Place Las Piñas

May 29, 2022
1:45 pm

Report

| TNT Tropang Giga | 17–18 | Meralco Bolts 3x3 |

Robinsons Place Las Piñas

May 29, 2022
2:10 pm

Report

| Platinum Karaoke | 16–20 | Terrafirma 3x3 |

Robinsons Place Las Piñas

==== Semifinals ====
May 29, 2022
2:35 pm

Report

| Meralco Bolts 3x3 | 19–15 | Barangay Ginebra San Miguel |

Robinsons Place Las Piñas

May 29, 2022
3:00 pm

Report

| Cavitex Braves | 22–11 | Terrafirma 3x3 |

Robinsons Place Las Piñas

==== Third place game ====
May 29, 2022
3:40 pm

Report

| Barangay Ginebra San Miguel | 20–19 | Terrafirma 3x3 |

Robinsons Place Las Piñas

==== Finals ====
May 29, 2022
4:05 pm

Report

| Meralco Bolts 3x3 | 18–17 | Cavitex Braves |

Robinsons Place Las Piñas

=== Final standings ===
| Pos | Team | Pld | W | L | PCT | AVG | PF | Tour points |
|---|---|---|---|---|---|---|---|---|
| 1 | Meralco Bolts 3x3 | 5 | 4 | 1 | .800 | 17.8 | 89 | 100 |
| 2 | Cavitex Braves | 6 | 3 | 3 | .500 | 19.2 | 115 | 80 |
| 3 | Barangay Ginebra San Miguel | 5 | 3 | 2 | .600 | 19.0 | 95 | 70 |
| 4 | Terrafirma 3x3 | 6 | 3 | 3 | .500 | 18.0 | 108 | 60 |
Eliminated at the quarterfinals
| 5 | Purefoods TJ Titans | 4 | 3 | 1 | .750 | 19.0 | 76 | 50 |
| 6 | Platinum Karaoke | 3 | 2 | 1 | .667 | 18.0 | 54 | 45 |
| 7 | TNT Tropang Giga | 4 | 2 | 2 | .500 | 19.0 | 76 | 40 |
| 8 | Limitless Appmasters | 3 | 1 | 2 | .333 | 20.3 | 61 | 35 |
Eliminated at the preliminary round
| 9 | NorthPort Batang Pier | 3 | 2 | 1 | .667 | 15.3 | 46 | 20 |
| 10 | San Miguel Beermen | 2 | 1 | 1 | .500 | 16.5 | 33 | 18 |
| 11 | Pioneer Pro Tibay | 3 | 1 | 2 | .333 | 17.3 | 52 | 16 |
| 12 | Master Sardines Fishing Champs | 3 | 1 | 2 | .333 | 16.0 | 48 | 14 |
| 13 | Sista Super Sealers | 3 | 0 | 3 | .000 | 14.7 | 44 | 12 |
| 14 | Zamboanga Valientes | 2 | 0 | 2 | .000 | 13.0 | 26 | 11 |

Source: PBA 3x3

== 3rd leg ==
=== Groupings ===
| Pool A | Pool B | Pool C | Pool D |
|---|---|---|---|
| Meralco Bolts 3x3 (1); Limitless Appmasters (8); NorthPort Batang Pier (9); Zamboanga Valientes (14) | Cavitex Braves (2); TNT Tropang Giga (7); San Miguel Beermen (10) | Barangay Ginebra San Miguel (3); Platinum Karaoke (6); Pioneer Pro Tibay (11); Sista Super Sealers (13) | Terrafirma 3x3 (4); Purefoods TJ Titans (5); Master Sardines Fishing Champs (13) |

=== Preliminary round ===
==== Pool A ====
| Pos | Team | Pld | W | L | PF | PA | PD | PCT | Qualification |
|---|---|---|---|---|---|---|---|---|---|
| 1 | Meralco Bolts 3x3 | 3 | 3 | 0 | 60 | 44 | +16 | 1.000 | Quarterfinals |
| 2 | Limitless Appmasters | 3 | 2 | 1 | 55 | 42 | +13 | .667 | Quarterfinals |
| 3 | Zamboanga Valientes | 3 | 1 | 2 | 41 | 61 | −20 | .333 | |
| 4 | NorthPort Batang Pier | 3 | 0 | 3 | 52 | 61 | −9 | .000 | |

Source: PBA 3x3
Rules for classification: 1) Wins; Win ratio if unequal number of games; 2) Head-to-head record; 3) Average points per game; 4) Higher seed.

June 6, 2022
10:00 am

Report

| Limitless Appmasters | 18–13 | NorthPort Batang Pier |

Robinsons Magnolia

June 6, 2022
10:25 am

Report

| Meralco Bolts 3x3 | 20–9 | Zamboanga Valientes |

Robinsons Magnolia

June 6, 2022
12:30 pm

Report

| Zamboanga Valientes | 22–20 | NorthPort Batang Pier |

Robinsons Magnolia

June 6, 2022
12:55 pm

Report

| Meralco Bolts 3x3 | 19–16 | Limitless Appmasters |

Robinsons Magnolia

June 6, 2022
3:00 pm

Report

| Limitless Appmasters | 21–10 | Zamboanga Valientes |

Robinsons Magnolia

June 7, 2022
10:00 am

Report

| NorthPort Batang Pier | 19–21 | Meralco Bolts 3x3 |

Robinsons Magnolia

==== Pool B ====
| Pos | Team | Pld | W | L | PF | PA | PD | PCT | Qualification |
|---|---|---|---|---|---|---|---|---|---|
| 1 | San Miguel Beermen | 2 | 1 | 1 | 37 | 31 | +6 | .500 (Note: San Miguel Beermen 18.5 avg. points; TNT Tropang Giga 18.0 avg. points; Cavitex Braves 16.5 avg. points) | Quarterfinals |
| 2 | TNT Tropang Giga | 2 | 1 | 1 | 36 | 39 | −3 | .500 | Quarterfinals |
| 3 | Cavitex Braves | 2 | 1 | 1 | 33 | 36 | −3 | .500 | |

Source: PBA 3x3
Rules for classification: 1) Wins; Win ratio if unequal number of games; 2) Head-to-head record; 3) Average points per game; 4) Higher seed.
Notes:

June 6, 2022
10:50 am

Report

| TNT Tropang Giga | 19–18 | San Miguel Beermen |

Robinsons Magnolia

June 6, 2022
1:45 pm

Report

| Cavitex Braves | 12–19 | San Miguel Beermen |

Robinsons Magnolia

June 7, 2022
10:25 am

Report

| Cavitex Braves | 21–17 | TNT Tropang Giga |

Robinsons Magnolia

==== Pool C ====
| Pos | Team | Pld | W | L | PF | PA | PD | PCT | Qualification |
|---|---|---|---|---|---|---|---|---|---|
| 1 | Sista Super Sealers | 3 | 2 | 1 | 51 | 45 | +6 | .667 (Note: Sista Super Sealers 17.0 avg. points; Platinum Karaoke 14.3 avg. points; Pioneer Pro Tibay 13.7 avg. points) | Quarterfinals |
| 2 | Platinum Karaoke | 3 | 2 | 1 | 43 | 43 | 0 | .667 | Quarterfinals |
| 3 | Pioneer Pro Tibay | 3 | 2 | 1 | 41 | 32 | +9 | .667 | |
| 4 | Barangay Ginebra San Miguel | 3 | 0 | 3 | 35 | 50 | −15 | .000 | |

Source: PBA 3x3
Rules for classification: 1) Wins; Win ratio if unequal number of games; 2) Head-to-head record; 3) Average points per game; 4) Higher seed.
Notes:

June 6, 2022
11:15 am

Report

| Sista Super Sealers | 12–18 | Pioneer Pro Tibay |

Robinsons Magnolia

June 6, 2022
11:40 am

Report

| Barangay Ginebra San Miguel | 15–16 | Platinum Karaoke |

Robinsons Magnolia

June 6, 2022
1:20 pm

Report

| Pioneer Pro Tibay | 16–10 | Barangay Ginebra San Miguel |

Robinsons Magnolia

June 6, 2022
2:10 pm

Report

| Platinum Karaoke | 17–21 | Sista Super Sealers |

Robinsons Magnolia

June 6, 2022
3:25 pm

Report

| Barangay Ginebra San Miguel | 10–18 | Sista Super Sealers |

Robinsons Magnolia

June 7, 2022
10:50 am

Report

| Platinum Karaoke | 10–7 | Pioneer Pro Tibay |

Robinsons Magnolia

==== Pool D ====
| Pos | Team | Pld | W | L | PF | PA | PD | PCT | Qualification |
|---|---|---|---|---|---|---|---|---|---|
| 1 | Purefoods TJ Titans | 2 | 2 | 0 | 42 | 26 | +16 | 1.000 | Quarterfinals |
| 2 | Master Sardines Fishing Champs | 2 | 1 | 1 | 34 | 37 | −3 | .500 | Quarterfinals |
| 3 | Terrafirma 3x3 | 2 | 0 | 2 | 27 | 40 | −13 | .000 | |

Source: PBA 3x3
Rules for classification: 1) Wins; Win ratio if unequal number of games; 2) Head-to-head record; 3) Average points per game; 4) Higher seed.

June 6, 2022
12:05 pm

Report

| Purefoods TJ Titans | 21–15 | Master Sardines Fishing Champs |

Robinsons Magnolia

June 6, 2022
2:35 pm

Report

| Terrafirma 3x3 | 16–19 | Master Sardines Fishing Champs |

Robinsons Magnolia

June 7, 2022
11:15 am

Report

| Terrafirma 3x3 | 11–21 | Purefoods TJ Titans |

Robinsons Magnolia

=== Knockout stage ===
TNT Tropang Giga defeated Purefoods TJ Titans in the finals, 21–13, to become the third leg winners.

==== Bracket ====
Quarterfinals
A1 | Meralco Bolts 3x3 | 16
D2 | Master Sardines Fishing Champs | 14
C1 | Sista Super Sealers | 16
B2 | TNT Tropang Giga | 21
B1 | San Miguel Beermen | 15
C2 | Platinum Karaoke | 21
D1 | Purefoods TJ Titans | 21
A2 | Limitless Appmasters | 19

Semifinals
A1 | Meralco Bolts 3x3 | 14
B2 | TNT Tropang Giga | 18
C2 | Platinum Karaoke | 16
D1 | Purefoods TJ Titans | 18

Finals
B2 | TNT Tropang Giga | 21
D1 | Purefoods TJ Titans | 13
Third place
A1 | Meralco Bolts 3x3 | 12
C2 | Platinum Karaoke | 14

==== Quarterfinals ====
June 7, 2022
11:40 am

Report

| TNT Tropang Giga | 21–16 | Sista Super Sealers |

Robinsons Magnolia

June 7, 2022
12:05 pm

Report

| San Miguel Beermen | 15–21 | Platinum Karaoke |

Robinsons Magnolia

June 7, 2022
12:30 pm

Report

| Meralco Bolts 3x3 | 16–14 | Master Sardines Fishing Champs |

Robinsons Magnolia

June 7, 2022
12:55 pm

Report

| Purefoods TJ Titans | 21–19 | Limitless Appmasters |

Robinsons Magnolia

==== Semifinals ====
June 7, 2022
1:20 pm

Report

| Meralco Bolts 3x3 | 14–18 | TNT Tropang Giga |

Robinsons Magnolia

June 7, 2022
1:45 pm

Report

| Platinum Karaoke | 16–18 | Purefoods TJ Titans |

Robinsons Magnolia

==== Third place game ====
June 7, 2022
2:25 pm

Report

| Meralco Bolts 3x3 | 12–14 | Platinum Karaoke |

Robinsons Magnolia

==== Finals ====
June 7, 2022
2:50 pm

Report

| TNT Tropang Giga | 21–13 | Purefoods TJ Titans |

Robinsons Magnolia

=== Final standings ===
| Pos | Team | Pld | W | L | PCT | AVG | PF | Tour points |
|---|---|---|---|---|---|---|---|---|
| 1 | TNT Tropang Giga | 5 | 4 | 1 | .800 | 19.2 | 96 | 100 |
| 2 | Purefoods TJ Titans | 5 | 4 | 1 | .800 | 18.6 | 93 | 80 |
| 3 | Platinum Karaoke | 6 | 4 | 2 | .667 | 15.7 | 94 | 70 |
| 4 | Meralco Bolts 3x3 | 6 | 4 | 2 | .667 | 17.0 | 102 | 60 |
Eliminated at the quarterfinals
| 5 | Limitless Appmasters | 4 | 2 | 2 | .500 | 18.5 | 74 | 50 |
| 6 | Sista Super Sealers | 4 | 2 | 2 | .500 | 16.8 | 67 | 45 |
| 7 | San Miguel Beermen | 3 | 1 | 2 | .333 | 17.3 | 52 | 40 |
| 8 | Master Sardines Fishing Champs | 3 | 1 | 2 | .333 | 16.0 | 48 | 35 |
Eliminated at the preliminary round
| 9 | Pioneer Pro Tibay | 3 | 2 | 1 | .667 | 13.7 | 41 | 20 |
| 10 | Cavitex Braves | 2 | 1 | 1 | .500 | 16.5 | 33 | 18 |
| 11 | Zamboanga Valientes | 3 | 1 | 2 | .333 | 13.7 | 41 | 16 |
| 12 | NorthPort Batang Pier | 3 | 0 | 3 | .000 | 17.3 | 52 | 14 |
| 13 | Terrafirma 3x3 | 2 | 0 | 2 | .000 | 13.5 | 27 | 12 |
| 14 | Barangay Ginebra San Miguel | 3 | 0 | 3 | .000 | 11.7 | 35 | 11 |

Source: PBA 3x3

== 4th leg ==
=== Groupings ===
| Pool A | Pool B | Pool C | Pool D |
|---|---|---|---|
| TNT Tropang Giga (1); Master Sardines Fishing Champs (8); Pioneer Pro Tibay (9); Barangay Ginebra San Miguel (14) | Purefoods TJ Titans (2); San Miguel Beermen (7); Cavitex Braves (10) | Platinum Karaoke (3); Sista Super Sealers (6); Zamboanga Valientes (11); Terrafirma 3x3 (13) | Meralco Bolts 3x3 (4); Limitless Appmasters (5); NorthPort Batang Pier (12) |

=== Preliminary round ===
==== Pool A ====
| Pos | Team | Pld | W | L | PF | PA | PD | PCT | Qualification |
|---|---|---|---|---|---|---|---|---|---|
| 1 | TNT Tropang Giga | 3 | 2 | 1 | 58 | 47 | +11 | .667 (Note: TNT Tropang Giga 19.3 avg. points; Pioneer Pro Tibay 18.7 avg. points; Barangay Ginebra San Miguel 17.3 avg. points) | Quarterfinals |
| 2 | Pioneer Pro Tibay | 3 | 2 | 1 | 56 | 52 | +4 | .667 | Quarterfinals |
| 3 | Barangay Ginebra San Miguel | 3 | 2 | 1 | 52 | 51 | +1 | .667 | |
| 4 | Master Sardines Fishing Champs | 3 | 0 | 3 | 44 | 60 | −16 | .000 | |

Source: PBA 3x3
Rules for classification: 1) Wins; Win ratio if unequal number of games; 2) Head-to-head record; 3) Average points per game; 4) Higher seed.
Notes:

June 11, 2022
9:00 am

Report

| Master Sardines Fishing Champs | 18–20 | Pioneer Pro Tibay |

Ynares Center

June 11, 2022
9:25 am

Report

| TNT Tropang Giga | 15–21 | Barangay Ginebra San Miguel |

Ynares Center

June 11, 2022
11:30 am

Report

| TNT Tropang Giga | 22–12 | Master Sardines Fishing Champs |

Ynares Center

June 11, 2022
11:55 am

Report

| Barangay Ginebra San Miguel | 13–22 | Pioneer Pro Tibay |

Ynares Center

June 11, 2022
2:00 pm

Report

| Master Sardines Fishing Champs | 14–18 | Barangay Ginebra San Miguel |

Ynares Center

June 12, 2022
9:00 am

Report

| Pioneer Pro Tibay | 14–21 | TNT Tropang Giga |

Ynares Center

==== Pool B ====
| Pos | Team | Pld | W | L | PF | PA | PD | PCT | Qualification |
|---|---|---|---|---|---|---|---|---|---|
| 1 | Cavitex Braves | 2 | 2 | 0 | 43 | 30 | +13 | 1.000 | Quarterfinals |
| 2 | San Miguel Beermen | 2 | 1 | 1 | 34 | 41 | −7 | .500 | Quarterfinals |
| 3 | Purefoods TJ Titans | 2 | 0 | 2 | 37 | 43 | −6 | .000 | |

Source: PBA 3x3
Rules for classification: 1) Wins; Win ratio if unequal number of games; 2) Head-to-head record; 3) Average points per game; 4) Higher seed.

June 11, 2022
9:50 am

Report

| Purefoods TJ Titans | 17–22 | Cavitex Braves |

Ynares Center

June 11, 2022
12:20 pm

Report

| San Miguel Beermen | 13–21 | Cavitex Braves |

Ynares Center

June 12, 2022
9:25 am

Report

| Purefoods TJ Titans | 20–21 | San Miguel Beermen |

Ynares Center

==== Pool C ====
| Pos | Team | Pld | W | L | PF | PA | PD | PCT | Qualification |
|---|---|---|---|---|---|---|---|---|---|
| 1 | Platinum Karaoke | 3 | 2 | 1 | 60 | 46 | +14 | .667 (Note: Platinum Karaoke 20.0 avg. points; Terrafirma 3x3 19.3 avg. points; Sista Super Sealers 18.7 avg. points) | Quarterfinals |
| 2 | Terrafirma 3x3 | 3 | 2 | 1 | 58 | 54 | +4 | .667 | Quarterfinals |
| 3 | Sista Super Sealers | 3 | 2 | 1 | 56 | 47 | +9 | .667 | |
| 4 | Zamboanga Valientes | 3 | 0 | 3 | 37 | 64 | −27 | .000 | |

Source: PBA 3x3
Rules for classification: 1) Wins; Win ratio if unequal number of games; 2) Head-to-head record; 3) Average points per game; 4) Higher seed.
Notes:

June 11, 2022
10:15 am

Report

| Sista Super Sealers | 21–9 | Zamboanga Valientes |

Ynares Center

June 11, 2022
10:40 am

Report

| Platinum Karaoke | 21–16 | Terrafirma 3x3 |

Ynares Center

June 11, 2022
12:45 pm

Report

| Sista Super Sealers | 15–21 | Terrafirma 3x3 |

Ynares Center

June 11, 2022
1:10 pm

Report

| Zamboanga Valientes | 10–22 | Platinum Karaoke |

Ynares Center

June 11, 2022
2:25 pm

Report

| Terrafirma 3x3 | 21–18 | Zamboanga Valientes |

Ynares Center

June 12, 2022
9:50 am

Report

| Platinum Karaoke | 17–20 | Sista Super Sealers |

Ynares Center

==== Pool D ====
| Pos | Team | Pld | W | L | PF | PA | PD | PCT | Qualification |
|---|---|---|---|---|---|---|---|---|---|
| 1 | Limitless Appmasters | 2 | 1 | 1 | 39 | 34 | +5 | .500 (Note: Limitless Appmasters 19.5 avg. points; Meralco Bolts 3x3 17.5 avg. points; NorthPort Batang Pier 16.5 avg. points) | Quarterfinals |
| 2 | Meralco Bolts 3x3 | 2 | 1 | 1 | 35 | 34 | +1 | .500 | Quarterfinals |
| 3 | NorthPort Batang Pier | 2 | 1 | 1 | 33 | 39 | −6 | .500 | |

Source: PBA 3x3
Rules for classification: 1) Wins; Win ratio if unequal number of games; 2) Head-to-head record; 3) Average points per game; 4) Higher seed.
Notes:

June 11, 2022
11:05 am

Report

| Limitless Appmasters | 18–20 | NorthPort Batang Pier |

Ynares Center

June 11, 2022
1:35 pm

Report

| Meralco Bolts 3x3 | 21–13 | NorthPort Batang Pier |

Ynares Center

June 12, 2022
10:15 am

Report

| Meralco Bolts 3x3 | 14–21 | Limitless Appmasters |

Ynares Center

=== Knockout stage ===
TNT Tropang Giga defeated Terrafirma 3x3 in the finals, 21–15, to win the fourth leg and repeat as leg winners.

==== Bracket ====
Quarterfinals
A1 | TNT Tropang Giga | 21
D2 | Meralco Bolts 3x3 | 14
C1 | Platinum Karaoke | 19
B2 | San Miguel Beermen | 21
B1 | Cavitex Braves | 20
C2 | Terrafirma 3x3 | 22
D1 | Limitless Appmasters | 21
A2 | Pioneer Pro Tibay | 18

Semifinals
A1 | TNT Tropang Giga | 16
B2 | San Miguel Beermen | 10
C2 | Terrafirma 3x3 | 21
D1 | Limitless Appmasters | 17

Finals
A1 | TNT Tropang Giga | 21
C2 | Terrafirma 3x3 | 15
Third place
B2 | San Miguel Beermen | 21
D1 | Limitless Appmasters | 17

==== Quarterfinals ====
June 12, 2022
10:40 am

Report

| Platinum Karaoke | 19–21 | San Miguel Beermen |

Ynares Center

June 12, 2022
11:05 am

Report

| Cavitex Braves | 20–22 | Terrafirma 3x3 |

Ynares Center

June 12, 2022
11:30 am

Report

| TNT Tropang Giga | 21–14 | Meralco Bolts 3x3 |

Ynares Center

June 12, 2022
11:55 am

Report

| Limitless Appmasters | 21–18 | Pioneer Pro Tibay |

Ynares Center

==== Semifinals ====
June 12, 2022
12:20 pm

Report

| TNT Tropang Giga | 16–10 | San Miguel Beermen |

Ynares Center

June 12, 2022
12:45 pm

Report

| Terrafirma 3x3 | 21–17 | Limitless Appmasters |

Ynares Center

==== Third place game ====
June 12, 2022
1:25 pm

Report

| San Miguel Beermen | 21–17 | Limitless Appmasters |

Ynares Center

==== Finals ====
June 12, 2022
1:50 pm

Report

| TNT Tropang Giga | 21–15 | Terrafirma 3x3 |

Ynares Center

=== Final standings ===
| Pos | Team | Pld | W | L | PCT | AVG | PF | Tour points |
|---|---|---|---|---|---|---|---|---|
| 1 | TNT Tropang Giga | 6 | 5 | 1 | .833 | 19.3 | 116 | 100 |
| 2 | Terrafirma 3x3 | 6 | 4 | 2 | .667 | 19.3 | 116 | 80 |
| 3 | San Miguel Beermen | 5 | 3 | 2 | .600 | 17.2 | 86 | 70 |
| 4 | Limitless Appmasters | 5 | 2 | 3 | .400 | 18.8 | 94 | 60 |
Eliminated at the quarterfinals
| 5 | Cavitex Braves | 3 | 2 | 1 | .667 | 21.0 | 63 | 50 |
| 6 | Platinum Karaoke | 4 | 2 | 2 | .500 | 19.8 | 79 | 45 |
| 7 | Pioneer Pro Tibay | 4 | 2 | 2 | .500 | 18.5 | 74 | 40 |
| 8 | Meralco Bolts 3x3 | 3 | 1 | 2 | .333 | 16.3 | 49 | 35 |
Eliminated at the preliminary round
| 9 | Sista Super Sealers | 3 | 2 | 1 | .667 | 18.7 | 56 | 20 |
| 10 | Barangay Ginebra San Miguel | 3 | 2 | 1 | .667 | 17.3 | 52 | 18 |
| 11 | NorthPort Batang Pier | 2 | 1 | 1 | .500 | 16.5 | 33 | 16 |
| 12 | Purefoods TJ Titans | 2 | 0 | 2 | .000 | 18.5 | 37 | 14 |
| 13 | Master Sardines Fishing Champs | 3 | 0 | 3 | .000 | 14.7 | 44 | 12 |
| 14 | Zamboanga Valientes | 3 | 0 | 3 | .000 | 12.3 | 37 | 11 |

Source: PBA 3x3

== 5th leg ==
=== Groupings ===
| Pool A | Pool B | Pool C | Pool D |
|---|---|---|---|
| TNT Tropang Giga (1); Meralco Bolts 3x3 (8); Sista Super Sealers (9); Zamboanga Valientes (14) | Terrafirma 3x3 (2); Pioneer Pro Tibay (7); Barangay Ginebra San Miguel (10) | San Miguel Beermen (3); Platinum Karaoke (6); NorthPort Batang Pier (11); Master Sardines Fishing Champs (13) | Limitless Appmasters (4); Cavitex Braves (5); Purefoods TJ Titans (12) |

=== Preliminary round ===
==== Pool A ====
| Pos | Team | Pld | W | L | PF | PA | PD | PCT | Qualification |
|---|---|---|---|---|---|---|---|---|---|
| 1 | Meralco Bolts 3x3 | 3 | 3 | 0 | 61 | 34 | +27 | 1.000 | Quarterfinals |
| 2 | TNT Tropang Giga | 3 | 2 | 1 | 50 | 55 | −5 | .667 | Quarterfinals |
| 3 | Zamboanga Valientes | 3 | 1 | 2 | 53 | 60 | −7 | .333 | |
| 4 | Sista Super Sealers | 3 | 0 | 3 | 48 | 63 | −15 | .000 | |

Source: PBA 3x3
Rules for classification: 1) Wins; Win ratio if unequal number of games; 2) Head-to-head record; 3) Average points per game; 4) Higher seed.

June 18, 2022
10:00 am

Report

| Sista Super Sealers | 19–21 | TNT Tropang Giga |

Robinsons Place Antipolo

June 18, 2022
10:25 am

Report

| Meralco Bolts 3x3 | 21–15 | Zamboanga Valientes |

Robinsons Place Antipolo

June 18, 2022
12:30 pm

Report

| TNT Tropang Giga | 19–17 | Zamboanga Valientes |

Robinsons Place Antipolo

June 18, 2022
12:55 pm

Report

| Meralco Bolts 3x3 | 21–9 | Sista Super Sealers |

Robinsons Place Antipolo

June 18, 2022
3:00 pm

Report

| Zamboanga Valientes | 21–20 | Sista Super Sealers |

Robinsons Place Antipolo

June 19, 2022
10:00 am

Report

| TNT Tropang Giga | 10–19 | Meralco Bolts 3x3 |

Robinsons Place Antipolo

==== Pool B ====
| Pos | Team | Pld | W | L | PF | PA | PD | PCT | Qualification |
|---|---|---|---|---|---|---|---|---|---|
| 1 | Terrafirma 3x3 | 2 | 2 | 0 | 40 | 30 | +10 | 1.000 | Quarterfinals |
| 2 | Barangay Ginebra San Miguel | 2 | 1 | 1 | 29 | 31 | −2 | .500 | Quarterfinals |
| 3 | Pioneer Pro Tibay | 2 | 0 | 2 | 24 | 32 | −8 | .000 | |

Source: PBA 3x3
Rules for classification: 1) Wins; Win ratio if unequal number of games; 2) Head-to-head record; 3) Average points per game; 4) Higher seed.

June 18, 2022
10:50 am

Report

| Pioneer Pro Tibay | 10–13 | Barangay Ginebra San Miguel |

Robinsons Place Antipolo

June 18, 2022
2:10 pm

Report

| Terrafirma 3x3 | 19–14 | Pioneer Pro Tibay |

Robinsons Place Antipolo

June 19, 2022
10:25 am

Report

| Terrafirma 3x3 | 21–16 | Barangay Ginebra San Miguel |

Robinsons Place Antipolo

==== Pool C ====
| Pos | Team | Pld | W | L | PF | PA | PD | PCT | Qualification |
|---|---|---|---|---|---|---|---|---|---|
| 1 | San Miguel Beermen | 3 | 3 | 0 | 60 | 46 | +14 | 1.000 | Quarterfinals |
| 2 | Platinum Karaoke | 3 | 2 | 1 | 55 | 53 | +2 | .667 | Quarterfinals |
| 3 | NorthPort Batang Pier | 3 | 1 | 2 | 52 | 59 | −7 | .333 | |
| 4 | Master Sardines Fishing Champs | 3 | 0 | 3 | 48 | 57 | −9 | .000 | |

Source: PBA 3x3
Rules for classification: 1) Wins; Win ratio if unequal number of games; 2) Head-to-head record; 3) Average points per game; 4) Higher seed.

June 18, 2022
11:15 am

Report

| San Miguel Beermen | 19–17 | Platinum Karaoke |

Robinsons Place Antipolo

June 18, 2022
11:40 am

Report

| Master Sardines Fishing Champs | 16–21 | NorthPort Batang Pier |

Robinsons Place Antipolo

June 18, 2022
1:20 pm

Report

| Platinum Karaoke | 17–15 | Master Sardines Fishing Champs |

Robinsons Place Antipolo

June 18, 2022
1:45 pm

Report

| NorthPort Batang Pier | 12–22 | San Miguel Beermen |

Robinsons Place Antipolo

June 18, 2022
3:25 pm

Report

| San Miguel Beermen | 19–17 | Master Sardines Fishing Champs |

Robinsons Place Antipolo

June 19, 2022
10:50 am

Report

| Platinum Karaoke | 21–19 | NorthPort Batang Pier |

Robinsons Place Antipolo

==== Pool D ====
| Pos | Team | Pld | W | L | PF | PA | PD | PCT | Qualification |
|---|---|---|---|---|---|---|---|---|---|
| 1 | Purefoods TJ Titans | 2 | 1 | 1 | 37 | 38 | −1 | .500 (Note: Purefoods TJ Titans 18.5 avg. points; Cavitex Braves 18.0 avg. points; Limitless Appmasters 17.5 avg. points) | Quarterfinals |
| 2 | Cavitex Braves | 2 | 1 | 1 | 36 | 34 | +2 | .500 | Quarterfinals |
| 3 | Limitless Appmasters | 2 | 1 | 1 | 35 | 36 | −1 | .500 | |

Source: PBA 3x3
Rules for classification: 1) Wins; Win ratio if unequal number of games; 2) Head-to-head record; 3) Average points per game; 4) Higher seed.
Notes:

June 18, 2022
12:05 pm

Report

| Cavitex Braves | 21–16 | Purefoods TJ Titans |

Robinsons Place Antipolo

June 18, 2022
2:35 pm

Report

| Limitless Appmasters | 18–15 | Cavitex Braves |

Robinsons Place Antipolo

June 19, 2022
11:15 am

Report

| Limitless Appmasters | 17–21 | Purefoods TJ Titans |

Robinsons Place Antipolo

=== Knockout stage ===
San Miguel Beermen defeated TNT Tropang Giga in the finals, 21–12, to become the fifth leg winners and deny TNT a three-peat of leg wins.

==== Bracket ====
Quarterfinals
A1 | Meralco Bolts 3x3 | 14
D2 | Cavitex Braves | 16
C1 | San Miguel Beermen | 21
B2 | Barangay Ginebra San Miguel | 15
B1 | Terrafirma 3x3 | 16
C2 | Platinum Karaoke | 14
D1 | Purefoods TJ Titans | 17
A2 | TNT Tropang Giga | 21

Semifinals
D2 | Cavitex Braves | 20
C1 | San Miguel Beermen | 21
B1 | Terrafirma 3x3 | 15
A2 | TNT Tropang Giga | 21

Finals
C1 | San Miguel Beermen | 21
A2 | TNT Tropang Giga | 12
Third place
D2 | Cavitex Braves | 21
B1 | Terrafirma 3x3 | 14

==== Quarterfinals ====
June 19, 2022
11:40 am

Report

| San Miguel Beermen | 21–15 | Barangay Ginebra San Miguel |

Robinsons Place Antipolo

June 19, 2022
12:05 pm

Report

| Terrafirma 3x3 | 16–14 | Platinum Karaoke |

Robinsons Place Antipolo

June 19, 2022
12:30 pm

Report

| Meralco Bolts 3x3 | 14–16 | Cavitex Braves |

Robinsons Place Antipolo

June 19, 2022
12:55 pm

Report

| Purefoods TJ Titans | 17–21 | TNT Tropang Giga |

Robinsons Place Antipolo

==== Semifinals ====
June 19, 2022
1:20 pm

Report

| Cavitex Braves | 20–21 | San Miguel Beermen |

Robinsons Place Antipolo

June 19, 2022
1:45 pm

Report

| Terrafirma 3x3 | 15–21 | TNT Tropang Giga |

Robinsons Place Antipolo

==== Third place game ====
June 19, 2022
2:25 pm

Report

| Cavitex Braves | 21–14 | Terrafirma 3x3 |

Robinsons Place Antipolo

==== Finals ====
June 19, 2022
2:50 pm

Report

| San Miguel Beermen | 21–12 | TNT Tropang Giga |

Robinsons Place Antipolo

=== Final standings ===
| Pos | Team | Pld | W | L | PCT | AVG | PF | Tour points |
|---|---|---|---|---|---|---|---|---|
| 1 | San Miguel Beermen | 6 | 6 | 0 | 1.000 | 20.5 | 123 | 100 |
| 2 | TNT Tropang Giga | 6 | 4 | 2 | .667 | 17.3 | 104 | 80 |
| 3 | Cavitex Braves | 5 | 3 | 2 | .600 | 18.6 | 93 | 70 |
| 4 | Terrafirma 3x3 | 5 | 3 | 2 | .600 | 17.0 | 85 | 60 |
Eliminated at the quarterfinals
| 5 | Meralco Bolts 3x3 | 4 | 3 | 1 | .750 | 18.8 | 75 | 50 |
| 6 | Platinum Karaoke | 4 | 2 | 2 | .500 | 17.3 | 69 | 45 |
| 7 | Purefoods TJ Titans | 3 | 1 | 2 | .333 | 18.0 | 54 | 40 |
| 8 | Barangay Ginebra San Miguel | 3 | 1 | 2 | .333 | 14.7 | 44 | 35 |
Eliminated at the preliminary round
| 9 | Limitless Appmasters | 2 | 1 | 1 | .500 | 17.5 | 35 | 20 |
| 10 | Zamboanga Valientes | 3 | 1 | 2 | .333 | 17.7 | 53 | 18 |
| 11 | NorthPort Batang Pier | 3 | 1 | 2 | .333 | 17.3 | 52 | 16 |
| 12 | Sista Super Sealers | 3 | 0 | 3 | .000 | 16.0 | 48 | 14 |
| 13 | Master Sardines Fishing Champs | 3 | 0 | 3 | .000 | 16.0 | 48 | 12 |
| 14 | Pioneer Pro Tibay | 2 | 0 | 2 | .000 | 12.0 | 24 | 11 |

Source: PBA 3x3

== 6th leg ==
=== Groupings ===
| Pool A | Pool B | Pool C | Pool D |
|---|---|---|---|
| San Miguel Beermen (1); Barangay Ginebra San Miguel (8); Limitless Appmasters (9); Pioneer Pro Tibay (14) | TNT Tropang Giga (2); Purefoods TJ Titans (7); Zamboanga Valientes (10) | Cavitex Braves (3); Platinum Karaoke (6); NorthPort Batang Pier (11); Master Sardines Fishing Champs (13) | Terrafirma 3x3 (4); Meralco Bolts 3x3 (5); Sista Super Sealers (12) |

=== Preliminary round ===
==== Pool A ====
| Pos | Team | Pld | W | L | PF | PA | PD | PCT | Qualification |
|---|---|---|---|---|---|---|---|---|---|
| 1 | San Miguel Beermen | 3 | 3 | 0 | 63 | 52 | +11 | 1.000 | Quarterfinals |
| 2 | Limitless Appmasters | 3 | 2 | 1 | 53 | 48 | +5 | .667 | Quarterfinals |
| 3 | Barangay Ginebra San Miguel | 3 | 1 | 2 | 42 | 48 | −6 | .333 | |
| 4 | Pioneer Pro Tibay | 3 | 0 | 3 | 44 | 54 | −10 | .000 | |

Source: PBA 3x3
Rules for classification: 1) Wins; Win ratio if unequal number of games; 2) Head-to-head record; 3) Average points per game; 4) Higher seed.

June 25, 2022
10:00 am

Report

| Barangay Ginebra San Miguel | 12–17 | Limitless Appmasters |

Robinsons Place Manila

June 25, 2022
10:25 am

Report

| San Miguel Beermen | 21–19 | Pioneer Pro Tibay |

Robinsons Place Manila

June 25, 2022
12:30 pm

Report

| Pioneer Pro Tibay | 15–21 | Limitless Appmasters |

Robinsons Place Manila

June 25, 2022
12:55 pm

Report

| San Miguel Beermen | 21–18 | Barangay Ginebra San Miguel |

Robinsons Place Manila

June 25, 2022
3:00 pm

Report

| Barangay Ginebra San Miguel | 12–10 | Pioneer Pro Tibay |

Robinsons Place Manila

June 26, 2022
10:00 am

Report

| Limitless Appmasters | 15–21 | San Miguel Beermen |

Robinsons Place Manila

==== Pool B ====
| Pos | Team | Pld | W | L | PF | PA | PD | PCT | Qualification |
|---|---|---|---|---|---|---|---|---|---|
| 1 | TNT Tropang Giga | 2 | 2 | 0 | 35 | 28 | +7 | 1.000 | Quarterfinals |
| 2 | Purefoods TJ Titans | 2 | 1 | 1 | 33 | 26 | +7 | .500 | Quarterfinals |
| 3 | Zamboanga Valientes | 2 | 0 | 2 | 28 | 42 | −14 | .000 | |

Source: PBA 3x3
Rules for classification: 1) Wins; Win ratio if unequal number of games; 2) Head-to-head record; 3) Average points per game; 4) Higher seed.

June 25, 2022
10:50 am

Report

| Purefoods TJ Titans | 12–14 | TNT Tropang Giga |

Robinsons Place Manila

June 25, 2022
1:20 pm

Report

| Purefoods TJ Titans | 21–12 | Zamboanga Valientes |

Robinsons Place Manila

June 26, 2022
10:25 am

Report

| TNT Tropang Giga | 21–16 | Zamboanga Valientes |

Robinsons Place Manila

==== Pool C ====
| Pos | Team | Pld | W | L | PF | PA | PD | PCT | Qualification |
|---|---|---|---|---|---|---|---|---|---|
| 1 | Platinum Karaoke | 3 | 2 | 1 | 57 | 58 | −1 | .667 (Note: Platinum Karaoke 1–0 Cavitex Braves) | Quarterfinals |
| 2 | Cavitex Braves | 3 | 2 | 1 | 56 | 51 | +5 | .667 | Quarterfinals |
| 3 | Master Sardines Fishing Champs | 3 | 1 | 2 | 58 | 59 | −1 | .333 (Note: Master Sardines Fishing Champs 1–0 NorthPort Batang Pier) | |
| 4 | NorthPort Batang Pier | 3 | 1 | 2 | 55 | 58 | −3 | .333 | |

Source: PBA 3x3
Rules for classification: 1) Wins; Win ratio if unequal number of games; 2) Head-to-head record; 3) Average points per game; 4) Higher seed.
Notes:

June 25, 2022
11:15 am

Report

| NorthPort Batang Pier | 17–21 | Master Sardines Fishing Champs |

Robinsons Place Manila

June 25, 2022
11:40 am

Report

| Cavitex Braves | 16–18 | Platinum Karaoke |

Robinsons Place Manila

June 25, 2022
1:45 pm

Report

| Master Sardines Fishing Champs | 20–21 | Platinum Karaoke |

Robinsons Place Manila

June 25, 2022
2:10 pm

Report

| NorthPort Batang Pier | 16–19 | Cavitex Braves |

Robinsons Place Manila

June 25, 2022
3:25 pm

Report

| Platinum Karaoke | 18–22 | NorthPort Batang Pier |

Robinsons Place Manila

June 26, 2022
10:50 am

Report

| Cavitex Braves | 21–17 | Master Sardines Fishing Champs |

Robinsons Place Manila

==== Pool D ====
| Pos | Team | Pld | W | L | PF | PA | PD | PCT | Qualification |
|---|---|---|---|---|---|---|---|---|---|
| 1 | Sista Super Sealers | 2 | 2 | 0 | 41 | 31 | +10 | 1.000 | Quarterfinals |
| 2 | Meralco Bolts 3x3 | 2 | 1 | 1 | 37 | 36 | +1 | .500 | Quarterfinals |
| 3 | Terrafirma 3x3 | 2 | 0 | 2 | 28 | 39 | −11 | .000 | |

Source: PBA 3x3
Rules for classification: 1) Wins; Win ratio if unequal number of games; 2) Head-to-head record; 3) Average points per game; 4) Higher seed.

June 25, 2022
12:05 pm

Report

| Sista Super Sealers | 21–12 | Terrafirma 3x3 |

Robinsons Place Manila

June 25, 2022
2:35 pm

Report

| Meralco Bolts 3x3 | 19–20 | Sista Super Sealers |

Robinsons Place Manila

June 26, 2022
11:15 am

Report

| Meralco Bolts 3x3 | 18–16 | Terrafirma 3x3 |

Robinsons Place Manila

=== Knockout stage ===
==== Bracket ====
Quarterfinals
A1 | San Miguel Beermen | 13
D2 | Meralco Bolts 3x3 | 19
C1 | Platinum Karaoke | 15
B2 | Purefoods TJ Titans | 21
B1 | TNT Tropang Giga | 21
C2 | Cavitex Braves | 16
D1 | Sista Super Sealers | 15
A2 | Limitless Appmasters | 17

Semifinals
D2 | Meralco Bolts 3x3 | 17
B2 | Purefoods TJ Titans | 19
B1 | TNT Tropang Giga | 18
A2 | Limitless Appmasters | 16

Finals
B2 | Purefoods TJ Titans | 20
B1 | TNT Tropang Giga | 16
Third place
D2 | Meralco Bolts 3x3 | 18
A2 | Limitless Appmasters | 17

==== Quarterfinals ====
June 26, 2022
11:40 am

Report

| Platinum Karaoke | 15–21 | Purefoods TJ Titans |

Robinsons Place Manila

June 26, 2022
12:05 pm

Report

| TNT Tropang Giga | 21–16 | Cavitex Braves |

Robinsons Place Manila

June 26, 2022
12:30 pm

Report

| San Miguel Beermen | 13–19 | Meralco Bolts 3x3 |

Robinsons Place Manila

June 26, 2022
12:55 pm

Report

| Sista Super Sealers | 15–17 | Limitless Appmasters |

Robinsons Place Manila

==== Semifinals ====
June 26, 2022
1:20 pm

Report

| Meralco Bolts 3x3 | 17–19 | Purefoods TJ Titans |

Robinsons Place Manila

June 26, 2022
1:45 pm

Report

| TNT Tropang Giga | 18–16 | Limitless Appmasters |

Robinsons Place Manila

==== Third place game ====
June 26, 2022
2:25 pm

Report

| Meralco Bolts 3x3 | 18–17 | Limitless Appmasters |

Robinsons Place Manila

==== Finals ====
June 26, 2022
2:50 pm

Report

| Purefoods TJ Titans | 20–16 | TNT Tropang Giga |

Robinsons Place Manila

=== Final standings ===
| Pos | Team | Pld | W | L | PCT | AVG | PF | Tour points |
|---|---|---|---|---|---|---|---|---|
| 1 | Purefoods TJ Titans | 5 | 4 | 1 | .800 | 18.6 | 93 | 100 |
| 2 | TNT Tropang Giga | 5 | 4 | 1 | .800 | 18.0 | 90 | 80 |
| 3 | Meralco Bolts 3x3 | 5 | 3 | 2 | .600 | 18.2 | 91 | 70 |
| 4 | Limitless Appmasters | 6 | 3 | 3 | .500 | 17.2 | 103 | 60 |
Eliminated at the quarterfinals
| 5 | San Miguel Beermen | 4 | 3 | 1 | .750 | 19.0 | 76 | 50 |
| 6 | Sista Super Sealers | 3 | 2 | 1 | .667 | 18.7 | 56 | 45 |
| 7 | Platinum Karaoke | 4 | 2 | 2 | .500 | 18.0 | 72 | 40 |
| 8 | Cavitex Braves | 4 | 2 | 2 | .500 | 18.0 | 72 | 35 |
Eliminated at the preliminary round
| 9 | Master Sardines Fishing Champs | 3 | 1 | 2 | .333 | 19.3 | 58 | 20 |
| 10 | NorthPort Batang Pier | 3 | 1 | 2 | .333 | 18.3 | 55 | 18 |
| 11 | Barangay Ginebra San Miguel | 3 | 1 | 2 | .333 | 14.0 | 42 | 16 |
| 12 | Pioneer Pro Tibay | 3 | 0 | 3 | .000 | 14.7 | 44 | 14 |
| 13 | Terrafirma 3x3 | 2 | 0 | 2 | .000 | 14.0 | 28 | 12 |
| 14 | Zamboanga Valientes | 2 | 0 | 2 | .000 | 14.0 | 28 | 11 |

Source: PBA 3x3

== Legs summary ==
| Pos | Team | 1st leg | 2nd leg | 3rd leg | 4th leg | 5th leg | 6th leg | Pts | Qualification |
|---|---|---|---|---|---|---|---|---|---|
| 1 | TNT Tropang Giga | 1st | 7th | 1st | 1st | 2nd | 2nd | 500 | Qualification to Grand Finals quarterfinal round |
| 2 | Meralco Bolts 3x3 | 4th | 1st | 4th | 8th | 5th | 3rd | 375 | Qualification to Grand Finals quarterfinal round |
| 3 | Purefoods TJ Titans | 3rd | 5th | 2nd | 12th | 7th | 1st | 354 | Qualification to Grand Finals quarterfinal round |
| 4 | San Miguel Beermen | 7th | 10th | 7th | 3rd | 1st | 5th | 318 | Qualification to Grand Finals quarterfinal round |
| 5 | Cavitex Braves | 6th | 2nd | 10th | 5th | 3rd | 8th | 298 | Qualification to Grand Finals preliminary round |
| 6 | Platinum Karaoke | 5th | 6th | 3rd | 6th | 6th | 7th | 295 | Qualification to Grand Finals preliminary round |
| 7 | Terrafirma 3x3 | 9th | 4th | 13th | 2nd | 4th | 13th | 244 | Qualification to Grand Finals preliminary round |
| 8 | Limitless Appmasters | 10th | 8th | 5th | 4th | 9th | 4th | 243 | Qualification to Grand Finals preliminary round |
| 9 | Barangay Ginebra San Miguel | 2nd | 3rd | 14th | 10th | 8th | 11th | 230 | Qualification to Grand Finals preliminary round |
| 10 | Sista Super Sealers | 8th | 13th | 6th | 9th | 12th | 6th | 171 | Qualification to Grand Finals preliminary round |
| 11 | Pioneer Pro Tibay | 11th | 11th | 9th | 7th | 14th | 12th | 117 | |
| 12 | Master Sardines Fishing Champs | 13th | 12th | 8th | 13th | 13th | 9th | 105 | |
| 13 | NorthPort Batang Pier | 14th | 9th | 12th | 11th | 11th | 10th | 95 | |
| 14 | Zamboanga Valientes | 12th | 14th | 11th | 14th | 10th | 14th | 81 | |

Source: PBA 3x3

== Grand Finals ==
=== Preliminary round ===
==== Pool A ====
| Pos | Team | Pld | W | L | PF | PA | PD | PCT | Qualification |
|---|---|---|---|---|---|---|---|---|---|
| 1 | Limitless Appmasters | 2 | 2 | 0 | 42 | 35 | +7 | 1.000 | Quarterfinals |
| 2 | Barangay Ginebra San Miguel | 2 | 1 | 1 | 37 | 36 | +1 | .500 | Quarterfinals |
| 3 | Cavitex Braves | 2 | 0 | 2 | 35 | 43 | −8 | .000 | |

Source: PBA 3x3
Rules for classification: 1) Wins; Win ratio if unequal number of games; 2) Head-to-head record; 3) Average points per game; 4) Higher seed.

July 3, 2022
12:30 pm

Report

| Cavitex Braves | 16–21 | Barangay Ginebra San Miguel |

Robinsons Place Manila

July 3, 2022
1:20 pm

Report

| Limitless Appmasters | 20–16 | Barangay Ginebra San Miguel |

Robinsons Place Manila

July 3, 2022
2:10 pm

Report

| Cavitex Braves | 19–22 | Limitless Appmasters |

Robinsons Place Manila

==== Pool B ====
| Pos | Team | Pld | W | L | PF | PA | PD | PCT | Qualification |
|---|---|---|---|---|---|---|---|---|---|
| 1 | Platinum Karaoke | 2 | 2 | 0 | 38 | 22 | +16 | 1.000 | Quarterfinals |
| 2 | Sista Super Sealers | 2 | 1 | 1 | 29 | 27 | +2 | .500 | Quarterfinals |
| 3 | Terrafirma 3x3 | 2 | 0 | 2 | 18 | 36 | −18 | .000 | |

Source: PBA 3x3
Rules for classification: 1) Wins; Win ratio if unequal number of games; 2) Head-to-head record; 3) Average points per game; 4) Higher seed.

July 3, 2022
12:55 pm

Report

| Platinum Karaoke | 17–14 | Sista Super Sealers |

Robinsons Place Manila

July 3, 2022
1:45 pm

Report

| Terrafirma 3x3 | 10–15 | Sista Super Sealers |

Robinsons Place Manila

July 3, 2022
2:35 pm

Report

| Platinum Karaoke | 21–8 | Terrafirma 3x3 |

Robinsons Place Manila

=== Knockout stage ===
==== Bracket ====
Seed refers to the position of the team after six legs. Letter and number inside parentheses denotes the pool letter and pool position of the team, respectively, after the preliminary round of the Grand Finals.

Quarterfinals
1 | TNT Tropang Giga | 21
9 (A2) | Barangay Ginebra San Miguel | 14
6 (B1) | Platinum Karaoke | 8
4 | San Miguel Beermen | 10
3 | Purefoods TJ Titans | 18
8 (A1) | Limitless Appmasters | 16
10 (B2) | Sista Super Sealers | 18
2 | Meralco Bolts 3x3 | 12

Semifinals
1 | TNT Tropang Giga | 21
4 | San Miguel Beermen | 15
3 | Purefoods TJ Titans | 21
10 (B2) | Sista Super Sealers | 19

Finals
1 | TNT Tropang Giga | 21
3 | Purefoods TJ Titans | 19
Third place
4 | San Miguel Beermen | 20
10 (B2) | Sista Super Sealers | 21

==== Quarterfinals ====
July 3, 2022
3:00 pm

Report

| TNT Tropang Giga | 21–14 | Barangay Ginebra San Miguel |

Robinsons Place Manila

July 3, 2022
3:25 pm

Report

| Platinum Karaoke | 8–10 | San Miguel Beermen |

Robinsons Place Manila

July 3, 2022
3:50 pm

Report

| Purefoods TJ Titans | 18–16 | Limitless Appmasters |

Robinsons Place Manila

July 3, 2022
4:15 pm

Report

| Sista Super Sealers | 18–12 | Meralco Bolts 3x3 |

Robinsons Place Manila

==== Semifinals ====
July 3, 2022
4:40 pm

Report

| TNT Tropang Giga | 21–15 | San Miguel Beermen |

Robinsons Place Manila

July 3, 2022
5:05 pm

Report

| Purefoods TJ Titans | 21–19 | Sista Super Sealers |

Robinsons Place Manila

==== Third place game ====
July 3, 2022
5:30 pm

Report

| San Miguel Beermen | 20–21 | Sista Super Sealers |

Robinsons Place Manila

==== Finals ====
July 3, 2022
5:55 pm

Report

| TNT Tropang Giga | 21–19 | Purefoods TJ Titans |

Robinsons Place Manila
