= 2021 PBA 3x3 season – First conference =

First conference of the 2021 PBA 3x3 season

The first conference of the 2021 PBA 3x3 season started on November 20, 2021, and ended on December 29, 2021. It consisted of six two-day legs and a grand final. Limitless Appmasters became the conference's Grand Champion after defeating Platinum Karaoke in the Grand Finals, 18–16.

== Teams ==
Team	Players					
Barangay Ginebra San Miguel	Mikey Cabahug	Hubert Cani	Dennice Villamor	Jojo Cunanan	Jollo Go	
Cavitex Braves	Larry Fonacier	Kyles Lao	David Murrell	AC Soberano	Earnest Reyes	Dominick Fajardo
Limitless Appmasters	Reymar Caduyac	Jaypee Belencion	Brandon Ganuelas-Rosser	Jorey Napoles	Marvin Hayes	
Meralco Bolts 3x3	Alfred Batino	Joseph Sedurifa	Tonino Gonzaga	Dexter Maiquez	Maclean Sabellina	Ralph Deles
NorthPort Batang Pier	Jeepy Faundo	Michael Calisaan	Mark Olayon	LA Revilla		
Pioneer Pro Tibay	Gian Abrigo	Carlo De Chavez	Carlo Escalambre	Dan Reducto	Christian Rivera	Robin Roño
Platinum Karaoke	Karl Dehesa	JR Alabanza	Yutien Andrada	Chris De Chavez	Ryan Monteclaro	
Purefoods TJ Titans	Val Acuña	Joseph Eriobu	Pao Javelona	Jed Mendoza	Antonio Bonsubre	
San Miguel Beermen	Bacon Austria	Louie Vigil	James Mangahas	Jeff Manday	Jhan Nermal	JR Yasa
Sista Super Sealers	RJ Argamino	Leodaniel De Vera	Prince Rivero	Kenneth Mocon		
Terrafirma 3x3	Jebb Bulawan	Roider Cabrera	Terrence Tumalip	Dhon Reverente	Matt Salem	Immanuel Custodio
TNT Tropang Giga	Samboy de Leon	Lervin Flores	Jeremiah Gray	Almond Vosotros	Martin Gozum	Chris Javier
Zamboanga Valientes	Mac Cardona	JR Cawaling	Al-Daser Esa	Kyle Neypes	Reynaldo Demesa	Gino Jumao-as

== 1st leg ==
=== Groupings ===
The preliminary drawing of lots was held on November 13, 2021, at the Ynares Sports Arena in Pasig, where the first leg was also held.

Pool A	Pool B	Pool C
Limitless Appmasters; Platinum Karaoke; Purefoods TJ Titans; TNT Tropang Giga; Zamboanga Valientes	Barangay Ginebra San Miguel; Meralco Bolts 3x3 Sista Super Sealers; Terrafirma 3x3	Cavitex Braves; NorthPort Batang Pier; Pioneer Pro Tibay; San Miguel Beermen

=== Preliminary round ===
==== Pool A ====
Pos	Team	Pld	W	L	PF	PA	PD	PCT	Qualification
1	TNT Tropang Giga	4	4	0	83	63	+20	1.000	Quarterfinals
2	Platinum Karaoke	4	3	1	83	58	+25	.750	Quarterfinals
3	Purefoods TJ Titans	4	2	2	68	64	+4	.500	Quarterfinals
4	Limitless Appmasters	4	1	3	61	78	−17	.250	
5	Zamboanga Valientes	4	0	4	52	84	−32	.000	

Source: PBA 3x3
Rules for classification: 1) Wins; Win ratio if unequal number of games; 2) Head-to-head record; 3) Average points per game; 4) Higher seed.

November 20
2:00 pm

Report

Limitless Appmasters	15–17	Purefoods TJ Titans

Ynares Sports Arena

November 20
2:25 pm

Report

Zamboanga Valientes	7–21	Platinum Karaoke

Ynares Sports Arena

November 20
3:40 pm

Report

TNT Tropang Giga	21–9	Limitless Appmasters

Ynares Sports Arena

November 20
4:05 pm

Report

Purefoods TJ Titans	21–8	Zamboanga Valientes

Ynares Sports Arena

November 20
5:20 pm

Report

Platinum Karaoke	21–16	Limitless Appmasters

Ynares Sports Arena

November 20
5:45 pm

Report

Purefoods TJ Titans	16–20	TNT Tropang Giga

Ynares Sports Arena

November 20
7:00 pm

Report

Limitless Appmasters	21–19	Zamboanga Valientes

Ynares Sports Arena

November 20
7:25 pm

Report

Platinum Karaoke	21–14	Purefoods TJ Titans

Ynares Sports Arena

November 20
8:40 pm

Report

Zamboanga Valientes	18–21	TNT Tropang Giga

Ynares Sports Arena

November 21
2:40 pm

Report

TNT Tropang Giga	21–20	Platinum Karaoke

Ynares Sports Arena

==== Pool B ====
Pos	Team	Pld	W	L	PF	PA	PD	PCT	Qualification
1	Meralco Bolts 3x3	3	3	0	64	45	+19	1.000	Quarterfinals
2	Terrafirma 3x3	3	2	1	58	45	+13	.667	Quarterfinals
3	Barangay Ginebra San Miguel	3	1	2	46	58	−12	.333	Knockout game
4	Sista Super Sealers	3	0	3	44	64	−20	.000	

Source: PBA 3x3
Rules for classification: 1) Wins; Win ratio if unequal number of games; 2) Head-to-head record; 3) Average points per game; 4) Higher seed.

November 20
2:50 pm

Report

Barangay Ginebra San Miguel	21–16	Sista Super Sealers

Ynares Sports Arena

November 20
4:30 pm

Report

Barangay Ginebra San Miguel	13–21	Terrafirma 3x3

Ynares Sports Arena

November 20
6:10 pm

Report

Sista Super Sealers	17–22	Meralco Bolts 3x3

Ynares Sports Arena

November 20
8:15 pm

Report

Terrafirma 3x3	16–21	Meralco Bolts 3x3

Ynares Sports Arena

November 21
1:00 pm

Report

Terrafirma 3x3	21–11	Sista Super Sealers

Ynares Sports Arena

November 21
1:50 pm

Report

Meralco Bolts 3x3	21–12	Barangay Ginebra San Miguel

Ynares Sports Arena

==== Pool C ====
Pos	Team	Pld	W	L	PF	PA	PD	PCT	Qualification
1	San Miguel Beermen	3	2	1	60	56	+4	.667 (Note: San Miguel Beermen 1–0 Cavitex Braves)	Quarterfinals
2	Cavitex Braves	3	2	1	38	41	−3	.667	Quarterfinals
3	NorthPort Batang Pier	3	1	2	37	42	−5	.333 (Note: NorthPort Batang Pier 1–0 Pioneer Pro Tibay)	Knockout game
4	Pioneer Pro Tibay	3	1	2	22	18	+4	.333	

Source: PBA 3x3
Rules for classification: 1) Wins; Win ratio if unequal number of games; 2) Head-to-head record; 3) Average points per game; 4) Higher seed.
Notes:

November 20
3:15 pm

Report

Cavitex Braves	W–0 (Note: Pioneer Pro Tibay forfeited its games during the first day of the first leg after failing to secure a medical license from the Games and Amusements Board (GAB).)	Pioneer Pro Tibay

Ynares Sports Arena

November 20
4:55 pm

Report

Pioneer Pro Tibay	0–W	NorthPort Batang Pier

Ynares Sports Arena

November 20
6:35 pm

Report

NorthPort Batang Pier	17–21	San Miguel Beermen

Ynares Sports Arena

November 20
7:50 pm

Report

San Miguel Beermen	21–17	Cavitex Braves

Ynares Sports Arena

November 21
1:25 pm

Report

Pioneer Pro Tibay	22–18	San Miguel Beermen

Ynares Sports Arena

November 21
2:15 pm

Report

Cavitex Braves	21–20	NorthPort Batang Pier

Ynares Sports Arena

=== Knockout stage ===
TNT Tropang Giga defeated Meralco Bolts 3x3 in the finals, 21–18, to become the first leg winners.

==== Bracket ====
Knockout game
B3	Barangay Ginebra San Miguel	21
C3	NorthPort Batang Pier	16

Quarterfinals
A1	TNT Tropang Giga	21
B3	Barangay Ginebra San Miguel	14
B2	Terrafirma 3x3	19
A3	Purefoods TJ Titans	20
B1	Meralco Bolts 3x3	22
C2	Cavitex Braves	19
C1	San Miguel Beermen	8
A2	Platinum Karaoke	9

Semifinals
A1	TNT Tropang Giga	20
A3	Purefoods TJ Titans	16
B1	Meralco Bolts 3x3	18
A2	Platinum Karaoke	14

Finals
A1	TNT Tropang Giga	21
B1	Meralco Bolts 3x3	18
Third place
A3	Purefoods TJ Titans	21
A2	Platinum Karaoke	16

==== Knockout game ====
November 21
3:15 pm

Report

Barangay Ginebra San Miguel	21–16	NorthPort Batang Pier

Ynares Sports Arena

==== Quarterfinals ====
November 21
3:45 pm

Report

Terrafirma 3x3	19–20	Purefoods TJ Titans

Ynares Sports Arena

November 21
4:10 pm

Report

Meralco Bolts 3x3	22–19	Cavitex Braves

Ynares Sports Arena

November 21
4:35 pm

Report

TNT Tropang Giga	21–14	Barangay Ginebra San Miguel

Ynares Sports Arena

November 21
5:00 pm

Report

San Miguel Beermen	8–9	Platinum Karaoke

Ynares Sports Arena

==== Semifinals ====
November 21
5:25 pm

Report

TNT Tropang Giga	20–16	Purefoods TJ Titans

Ynares Sports Arena

November 21
5:50 pm

Report

Meralco Bolts 3x3	18–14	Platinum Karaoke

Ynares Sports Arena

==== Third place game ====
November 21
6:30 pm

Report

Purefoods TJ Titans	21–16	Platinum Karaoke

Ynares Sports Arena

==== Finals ====
November 21
6:55 pm

Report

TNT Tropang Giga	21–18	Meralco Bolts 3x3

Ynares Sports Arena

=== Final standings ===
Pos	Team	Pld	W	L	AVG	PF	Tour points
1	TNT Tropang Giga	7	7	0	20.7	145	100
2	Meralco Bolts 3x3	6	5	1	20.3	122	80
3	Purefoods TJ Titans	7	4	3	17.9	125	70
4	Platinum Karaoke	7	4	3	17.4	122	60
Eliminated at the quarterfinals
5	Terrafirma 3x3	4	2	2	19.3	77	50
6	Cavitex Braves	4	2	2	19.0 (Note: Per FIBA 3x3 Rules Article 20.2.1, the results of a forfeited game shall not be considered when calculating the winning team's average score.)	57	45
7	San Miguel Beermen	4	2	2	17.0	68	40
8	Barangay Ginebra San Miguel	5	2	3	16.2	81	35
Eliminated at the knockout game
9	NorthPort Batang Pier	4	1	3	17.7	53	20
Eliminated at the preliminary round
10	Pioneer Pro Tibay	3	1	2	7.3	22	18
11	Limitless Appmasters	4	1	3	15.3	61	16
12	Sista Super Sealers	3	0	3	14.7	44	14
13	Zamboanga Valientes	4	0	4	13.0	52	12

Source: PBA 3x3

== 2nd leg ==
=== Groupings ===
Pool A	Pool B	Pool C
TNT Tropang Giga (1); Cavitex Braves (6); San Miguel Beermen (7); Sista Super Sealers (12); Zamboanga Valientes (13)	Meralco Bolts 3x3 (2); Terrafirma 3x3 (5); Barangay Ginebra San Miguel (8); Limitless Appmasters (11)	Purefoods TJ Titans (3); Platinum Karaoke (4); NorthPort Batang Pier (9); Pioneer Pro Tibay (10)

=== Preliminary round ===
==== Pool A ====
Pos	Team	Pld	W	L	PF	PA	PD	PCT	Qualification
1	TNT Tropang Giga	4	3	1	82	67	+15	.750 (Note: TNT Tropang Giga 1–0 Sista Super Sealers)	Quarterfinals
2	Sista Super Sealers	4	3	1	82	74	+8	.750	Quarterfinals
3	San Miguel Beermen	4	2	2	73	68	+5	.500 (Note: San Miguel Beermen 1–0 Cavitex Braves)	Quarterfinals
4	Cavitex Braves	4	2	2	74	70	+4	.500	
5	Zamboanga Valientes	4	0	4	53	85	−32	.000	

Source: PBA 3x3
Rules for classification: 1) Wins; Win ratio if unequal number of games; 2) Head-to-head record; 3) Average points per game; 4) Higher seed.
Notes:

November 24
2:00 pm

Report

Zamboanga Valientes	18–21	TNT Tropang Giga

Ynares Sports Arena

November 24
2:25 pm

Report

Sista Super Sealers	22–16	Cavitex Braves

Ynares Sports Arena

November 24
3:40 pm

Report

TNT Tropang Giga	21–17	Sista Super Sealers

Ynares Sports Arena

November 24
4:05 pm

Report

Cavitex Braves	21–8	Zamboanga Valientes

Ynares Sports Arena

November 24
5:20 pm

Report

San Miguel Beermen	12–21	TNT Tropang Giga

Ynares Sports Arena

November 24
5:45 pm

Report

Sista Super Sealers	22–18	Zamboanga Valientes

Ynares Sports Arena

November 24
7:00 pm

Report

TNT Tropang Giga	19–20	Cavitex Braves

Ynares Sports Arena

November 24
7:25 pm

Report

San Miguel Beermen	19–21	Sista Super Sealers

Ynares Sports Arena

November 24
8:40 pm

Report

Cavitex Braves	17–21	San Miguel Beermen

Ynares Sports Arena

November 25
3:40 pm

Report

Zamboanga Valientes	9–21	San Miguel Beermen

Ynares Sports Arena

==== Pool B ====
Pos	Team	Pld	W	L	PF	PA	PD	PCT	Qualification
1	Limitless Appmasters	3	2	1	58	49	+9	.667 (Note: Limitless Appmasters 19.3 avg. points; Meralco Bolts 3x3 18.7 avg. points; Terrafirma 3x3 15.7 avg. points)	Quarterfinals
2	Meralco Bolts 3x3	3	2	1	56	48	+8	.667	Quarterfinals
3	Terrafirma 3x3	3	2	1	47	49	−2	.667	Knockout game
4	Barangay Ginebra San Miguel	3	0	3	46	61	−15	.000	

Source: PBA 3x3
Rules for classification: 1) Wins; Win ratio if unequal number of games; 2) Head-to-head record; 3) Average points per game; 4) Higher seed.
Notes:

November 24
2:50 pm

Report

Meralco Bolts 3x3	21–19	Limitless Appmasters

Ynares Sports Arena

November 24
4:30 pm

Report

Meralco Bolts 3x3	14–17	Terrafirma 3x3

Ynares Sports Arena

November 24
6:35 pm

Report

Limitless Appmasters	21–17	Barangay Ginebra San Miguel

Ynares Sports Arena

November 24
7:50 pm

Report

Terrafirma 3x3	19–17	Barangay Ginebra San Miguel

Ynares Sports Arena

November 25
2:00 pm

Report

Terrafirma 3x3	11–18	Limitless Appmasters

Ynares Sports Arena

November 25
2:50 pm

Report

Barangay Ginebra San Miguel	12–21	Meralco Bolts 3x3

Ynares Sports Arena

==== Pool C ====
Pos	Team	Pld	W	L	PF	PA	PD	PCT	Qualification
1	Platinum Karaoke	3	3	0	63	44	+19	1.000	Quarterfinals
2	Pioneer Pro Tibay	3	2	1	61	53	+8	.667	Quarterfinals
3	Purefoods TJ Titans	3	1	2	57	55	+2	.333	Knockout game
4	NorthPort Batang Pier	3	0	3	35	64	−29	.000	

Source: PBA 3x3
Rules for classification: 1) Wins; Win ratio if unequal number of games; 2) Head-to-head record; 3) Average points per game; 4) Higher seed.

November 24
3:15 pm

Report

Purefoods TJ Titans	20–21	Pioneer Pro Tibay

Ynares Sports Arena

November 24
4:55 pm

Report

Purefoods TJ Titans	16–21	Platinum Karaoke

Ynares Sports Arena

November 24
6:10 pm

Report

Pioneer Pro Tibay	22–12	NorthPort Batang Pier

Ynares Sports Arena

November 24
8:15 pm

Report

Platinum Karaoke	21–10	NorthPort Batang Pier

Ynares Sports Arena

November 25
2:25 pm

Report

Platinum Karaoke	21–18	Pioneer Pro Tibay

Ynares Sports Arena

November 25
3:15 pm

Report

NorthPort Batang Pier	13–21	Purefoods TJ Titans

Ynares Sports Arena

=== Knockout stage ===
Meralco Bolts 3x3 defeated Platinum Karaoke in the finals, 21–16, to become the second leg winners.

==== Bracket ====
Knockout game
B3	Terrafirma 3x3	22
C3	Purefoods TJ Titans	12

Quarterfinals
A1	TNT Tropang Giga	21
B3	Terrafirma 3x3	13
B2	Meralco Bolts 3x3	21
A3	San Miguel Beermen	12
B1	Limitless Appmasters	21
C2	Pioneer Pro Tibay	17
C1	Platinum Karaoke	20
A2	Sista Super Sealers	17

Semifinals
A1	TNT Tropang Giga	13
B2	Meralco Bolts 3x3	21
B1	Limitless Appmasters	16
C1	Platinum Karaoke	21

Finals
B2	Meralco Bolts 3x3	21
C1	Platinum Karaoke	16
Third place
A1	TNT Tropang Giga	21
B1	Limitless Appmasters	14

==== Knockout game ====
November 25
4:15 pm

Report

Terrafirma 3x3	22–12	Purefoods TJ Titans

Ynares Sports Arena

==== Quarterfinals ====
November 25
4:40 pm

Report

Meralco Bolts 3x3	21–12	San Miguel Beermen

Ynares Sports Arena

November 25
5:05 pm

Report

Limitless Appmasters	21–17	Pioneer Pro Tibay

Ynares Sports Arena

November 25
5:30 pm

Report

TNT Tropang Giga	21–13	Terrafirma 3x3

Ynares Sports Arena

November 25
5:55 pm

Report

Platinum Karaoke	20–17	Sista Super Sealers

Ynares Sports Arena

==== Semifinals ====
November 25
6:20 pm

Report

TNT Tropang Giga	13–21	Meralco Bolts 3x3

Ynares Sports Arena

November 25
6:45 pm

Report

Limitless Appmasters	16–21	Platinum Karaoke

Ynares Sports Arena

==== Third place game ====
November 25
7:25 pm

Report

TNT Tropang Giga	21–14	Limitless Appmasters

Ynares Sports Arena

==== Finals ====
November 25
7:50 pm

Report

Meralco Bolts 3x3	21–16	Platinum Karaoke

Ynares Sports Arena

=== Final standings ===
Pos	Team	Pld	W	L	AVG	PF	Tour points
1	Meralco Bolts 3x3	6	5	1	19.8	119	100
2	Platinum Karaoke	6	5	1	20.0	120	80
3	TNT Tropang Giga	7	5	2	19.6	137	70
4	Limitless Appmasters	6	3	3	18.2	109	60
Eliminated at the quarterfinals
5	Sista Super Sealers	5	3	2	19.8	99	50
6	Terrafirma 3x3	5	3	2	16.4	82	45
7	Pioneer Pro Tibay	4	2	2	19.5	78	40
8	San Miguel Beermen	5	2	3	17.0	85	35
Eliminated at the knockout game
9	Purefoods TJ Titans	4	1	3	17.3	69	20
Eliminated at the preliminary round
10	Cavitex Braves	4	2	2	18.5	74	18
11	Barangay Ginebra San Miguel	3	0	3	15.3	46	16
12	Zamboanga Valientes	4	0	4	13.3	53	14
13	NorthPort Batang Pier	3	0	3	11.7	35	12

Source: PBA 3x3

== 3rd leg ==
=== Groupings ===
Pool A	Pool B	Pool C
Meralco Bolts 3x3 (1); Terrafirma 3x3 (6); Pioneer Pro Tibay (7); Zamboanga Valientes (12); NorthPort Batang Pier (13)	Platinum Karaoke (2); Sista Super Sealers (5); San Miguel Beermen (8); Barangay Ginebra San Miguel (11)	TNT Tropang Giga (3); Limitless Appmasters (4); Purefoods TJ Titans (9); Cavitex Braves (10)

=== Preliminary round ===
==== Pool A ====
Pos	Team	Pld	W	L	PF	PA	PD	PCT	Qualification
1	Terrafirma 3x3	4	4	0	81	51	+30	1.000	Quarterfinals
2	Meralco Bolts 3x3	4	3	1	82	52	+30	.750	Quarterfinals
3	Pioneer Pro Tibay	4	2	2	61	67	−6	.500	Quarterfinals
4	NorthPort Batang Pier	4	1	3	65	80	−15	.250	
5	Zamboanga Valientes	4	0	4	44	83	−39	.000	

Source: PBA 3x3
Rules for classification: 1) Wins; Win ratio if unequal number of games; 2) Head-to-head record; 3) Average points per game; 4) Higher seed.

November 27
2:00 pm

Report

Meralco Bolts 3x3	18–22	Terrafirma 3x3

Ynares Sports Arena

November 27
2:25 pm

Report

NorthPort Batang Pier	17–21	Pioneer Pro Tibay

Ynares Sports Arena

November 27
3:40 pm

Report

Meralco Bolts 3x3	21–8	Zamboanga Valientes

Ynares Sports Arena

November 27
4:05 pm

Report

Terrafirma 3x3	17–14	Pioneer Pro Tibay

Ynares Sports Arena

November 27
5:20 pm

Report

Pioneer Pro Tibay	20–12	Zamboanga Valientes

Ynares Sports Arena

November 27
5:45 pm

Report

Terrafirma 3x3	21–11	NorthPort Batang Pier

Ynares Sports Arena

November 27
7:00 pm

Report

Zamboanga Valientes	16–21	NorthPort Batang Pier

Ynares Sports Arena

November 27
7:25 pm

Report

Pioneer Pro Tibay	6–21	Meralco Bolts 3x3

Ynares Sports Arena

November 28
12:50 pm

Report

Zamboanga Valientes	8–21	Terrafirma 3x3

Ynares Sports Arena

November 28
2:05 pm

Report

NorthPort Batang Pier	16–22	Meralco Bolts 3x3

Ynares Sports Arena

==== Pool B ====
Pos	Team	Pld	W	L	PF	PA	PD	PCT	Qualification
1	Sista Super Sealers	3	3	0	63	56	+7	1.000	Quarterfinals
2	Platinum Karaoke	3	2	1	62	54	+8	.667	Quarterfinals
3	Barangay Ginebra San Miguel	3	1	2	53	62	−9	.333	Knockout game
4	San Miguel Beermen	3	0	3	57	63	−6	.000	

Source: PBA 3x3
Rules for classification: 1) Wins; Win ratio if unequal number of games; 2) Head-to-head record; 3) Average points per game; 4) Higher seed.

November 27
2:50 pm

Report

Platinum Karaoke	22–15	Barangay Ginebra San Miguel

Ynares Sports Arena

November 27
4:30 pm

Report

Platinum Karaoke	19–22	Sista Super Sealers

Ynares Sports Arena

November 27
6:10 pm

Report

Barangay Ginebra San Miguel	21–20	San Miguel Beermen

Ynares Sports Arena

November 27
7:50 pm

Report

Sista Super Sealers	21–20	San Miguel Beermen

Ynares Sports Arena

November 27
12:00 pm

Report

Sista Super Sealers	20–17	Barangay Ginebra San Miguel

Ynares Sports Arena

November 27
1:15 pm

Report

San Miguel Beermen	17–21	Platinum Karaoke

Ynares Sports Arena

==== Pool C ====
Pos	Team	Pld	W	L	PF	PA	PD	PCT	Qualification
1	Purefoods TJ Titans	3	3	0	62	49	+13	1.000	Quarterfinals
2	Limitless Appmasters	3	2	1	59	53	+6	.667	Quarterfinals
3	TNT Tropang Giga	3	1	2	55	59	−4	.333	Knockout game
4	Cavitex Braves	3	0	3	47	62	−15	.000	

Source: PBA 3x3
Rules for classification: 1) Wins; Win ratio if unequal number of games; 2) Head-to-head record; 3) Average points per game; 4) Higher seed.

November 27
3:15 pm

Report

TNT Tropang Giga	20–17	Cavitex Braves

Ynares Sports Arena

November 27
4:55 pm

Report

TNT Tropang Giga	16–21	Limitless Appmasters

Ynares Sports Arena

November 27
6:35 pm

Report

Cavitex Braves	13–21	Purefoods TJ Titans

Ynares Sports Arena

November 27
8:15 pm

Report

Limitless Appmasters	17–20	Purefoods TJ Titans

Ynares Sports Arena

November 28
12:25 pm

Report

Limitless Appmasters	21–17	Cavitex Braves

Ynares Sports Arena

November 28
1:40 pm

Report

Purefoods TJ Titans	21–19	TNT Tropang Giga

Ynares Sports Arena

=== Knockout stage ===
Sista Super Sealers defeated Pioneer Pro Tibay in the finals, 20–13, to become the third leg winners.

==== Bracket ====
Knockout game
B3	Barangay Ginebra San Miguel	21
C3	TNT Tropang Giga	17

Quarterfinals
A1	Terrafirma 3x3	21
B3	Barangay Ginebra San Miguel	14
B2	Platinum Karaoke	19
A3	Pioneer Pro Tibay	21
B1	Sista Super Sealers	17
C2	Limitless Appmasters	16
C1	Purefoods TJ Titans	12
A2	Meralco Bolts 3x3	10

Semifinals
A1	Terrafirma 3x3	15
A3	Pioneer Pro Tibay	16
B1	Sista Super Sealers	19
C1	Purefoods TJ Titans	15

Finals
A3	Pioneer Pro Tibay	13
B1	Sista Super Sealers	20
Third place
A1	Terrafirma 3x3	21
C1	Purefoods TJ Titans	16

==== Knockout game ====
November 28
2:30 pm

Report

Barangay Ginebra San Miguel	21–17	TNT Tropang Giga

Ynares Sports Arena

==== Quarterfinals ====
November 28
3:00 pm

Report

Platinum Karaoke	19–21	Pioneer Pro Tibay

Ynares Sports Arena

November 28
3:25 pm

Report

Sista Super Sealers	17–16	Limitless Appmasters

Ynares Sports Arena

November 28
3:50 pm

Report

Terrafirma 3x3	21–14	Barangay Ginebra San Miguel

Ynares Sports Arena

November 28
4:15 pm

Report

Purefoods TJ Titans	12–10	Meralco Bolts 3x3

Ynares Sports Arena

==== Semifinals ====
November 28
4:40 pm

Report

Terrafirma 3x3	15–16	Pioneer Pro Tibay

Ynares Sports Arena

November 28
5:05 pm

Report

Sista Super Sealers	19–15	Purefoods TJ Titans

Ynares Sports Arena

==== Third place game ====
November 28
5:45 pm

Report

Terrafirma 3x3	21–16	Purefoods TJ Titans

Ynares Sports Arena

==== Finals ====
November 28
6:10 pm

Report

Pioneer Pro Tibay	13–20	Sista Super Sealers

Ynares Sports Arena

=== Final standings ===
Pos	Team	Pld	W	L	AVG	PF	Tour points
1	Sista Super Sealers	6	6	0	19.8	119	100
2	Pioneer Pro Tibay	7	4	3	15.9	111	80
3	Terrafirma 3x3	7	6	1	19.7	138	70
4	Purefoods TJ Titans	6	4	2	17.5	105	60
Eliminated at the quarterfinals
5	Meralco Bolts 3x3	5	3	2	18.4	92	50
6	Platinum Karaoke	4	2	2	20.3	81	45
7	Limitless Appmasters	4	2	2	18.8	75	40
8	Barangay Ginebra San Miguel	5	2	3	17.6	88	35
Eliminated at the knockout game
9	TNT Tropang Giga	4	1	3	18.0	72	20
Eliminated at the preliminary round
10	NorthPort Batang Pier	4	1	3	16.3	65	18
11	San Miguel Beermen	3	0	3	19.0	57	16
12	Cavitex Braves	3	0	3	15.7	47	14
13	Zamboanga Valientes	4	0	4	11.0	44	12

Source: PBA 3x3

== 4th leg ==
=== Groupings ===
Pool A	Pool B	Pool C
Sista Super Sealers (1); Platinum Karaoke (6); Limitless Appmasters (7); Cavitex Braves (12); Zamboanga Valientes (13)	Pioneer Pro Tibay (2); Meralco Bolts 3x3 (5); Barangay Ginebra San Miguel (8); San Miguel Beermen (11)	Terrafirma 3x3 (3); Purefoods TJ Titans (4); TNT Tropang Giga (9); NorthPort Batang Pier (10)

=== Preliminary round ===
==== Pool A ====
Pos	Team	Pld	W	L	PF	PA	PD	PCT	Qualification
1	Platinum Karaoke	4	4	0	84	52	+32	1.000	Quarterfinals
2	Limitless Appmasters	4	3	1	75	58	+17	.750	Quarterfinals
3	Cavitex Braves	4	2	2	74	72	+2	.500	Quarterfinals
4	Sista Super Sealers	4	1	3	66	72	−6	.250	
5	Zamboanga Valientes	4	0	4	41	86	−45	.000	

Source: PBA 3x3
Rules for classification: 1) Wins; Win ratio if unequal number of games; 2) Head-to-head record; 3) Average points per game; 4) Higher seed.

December 4
2:00 pm

Report

Sista Super Sealers	15–21	Cavitex Braves

Ynares Sports Arena

December 4
2:25 pm

Report

Zamboanga Valientes	7–21	Limitless Appmasters

Ynares Sports Arena

December 4
3:40 pm

Report

Cavitex Braves	13–21	Platinum Karaoke

Ynares Sports Arena

December 4
4:05 pm

Report

Zamboanga Valientes	9–22	Sista Super Sealers

Ynares Sports Arena

December 4
5:20 pm

Report

Limitless Appmasters	21–19	Cavitex Braves

Ynares Sports Arena

December 4
5:45 pm

Report

Sista Super Sealers	17–21	Platinum Karaoke

Ynares Sports Arena

December 4
7:00 pm

Report

Cavitex Braves	21–15	Zamboanga Valientes

Ynares Sports Arena

December 4
7:25 pm

Report

Platinum Karaoke	20–12	Limitless Appmasters

Ynares Sports Arena

December 5
1:20 pm

Report

Limitless Appmasters	21–12	Sista Super Sealers

Ynares Sports Arena

December 5
2:35 pm

Report

Platinum Karaoke	22–10	Zamboanga Valientes

Ynares Sports Arena

==== Pool B ====
Pos	Team	Pld	W	L	PF	PA	PD	PCT	Qualification
1	Pioneer Pro Tibay	3	2	1	57	51	+6	.667 (Note: Pioneer Pro Tibay 19.0 avg. points; Meralco Bolts 3x3 19.0 avg. points; San Miguel Beermen 16.7 avg. points. Pioneer Pro Tibay 2nd seed; Meralco Bolts 3x3 5th seed)	Quarterfinals
2	Meralco Bolts 3x3	3	2	1	57	53	+4	.667	Quarterfinals
3	San Miguel Beermen	3	2	1	50	52	−2	.667	Knockout game
4	Barangay Ginebra San Miguel	3	0	3	50	58	−8	.000	

Source: PBA 3x3
Rules for classification: 1) Wins; Win ratio if unequal number of games; 2) Head-to-head record; 3) Average points per game; 4) Higher seed.
Notes:

December 4
2:50 pm

Report

Pioneer Pro Tibay	21–12	San Miguel Beermen

Ynares Sports Arena

December 4
4:30 pm

Report

San Miguel Beermen	18–16	Barangay Ginebra San Miguel

Ynares Sports Arena

December 4
6:10 pm

Report

Pioneer Pro Tibay	17–21	Meralco Bolts 3x3

Ynares Sports Arena

December 4
7:50 pm

Report

Meralco Bolts 3x3	21–16	Barangay Ginebra San Miguel

Ynares Sports Arena

December 5
12:30 pm

Report

Meralco Bolts 3x3	16–20	San Miguel Beermen

Ynares Sports Arena

December 5
1:45 pm

Report

Barangay Ginebra San Miguel	18–19	Pioneer Pro Tibay

Ynares Sports Arena

==== Pool C ====
Pos	Team	Pld	W	L	PF	PA	PD	PCT	Qualification
1	TNT Tropang Giga	3	2	1	61	50	+11	.667 (Note: TNT Tropang Giga 20.3 avg. points; Purefoods TJ Titans 19.0 avg. points; Terrafirma 3x3 17.0 avg. points.)	Quarterfinals
2	Purefoods TJ Titans	3	2	1	57	46	+11	.667	Quarterfinals
3	Terrafirma 3x3	3	2	1	51	45	+6	.667	Knockout game
4	NorthPort Batang Pier	3	0	3	33	61	−28	.000	

Source: PBA 3x3
Rules for classification: 1) Wins; Win ratio if unequal number of games; 2) Head-to-head record; 3) Average points per game; 4) Higher seed.
Notes:

December 4
3:15 pm

Report

Terrafirma 3x3	19–9	NorthPort Batang Pier

Ynares Sports Arena

December 4
4:55 pm

Report

Terrafirma 3x3	18–15	Purefoods TJ Titans

Ynares Sports Arena

December 4
6:35 pm

Report

NorthPort Batang Pier	15–21	TNT Tropang Giga

Ynares Sports Arena

December 4
8:15 pm

Report

Purefoods TJ Titans	21–19	TNT Tropang Giga

Ynares Sports Arena

December 5
12:55 pm

Report

Purefoods TJ Titans	21–9	NorthPort Batang Pier

Ynares Sports Arena

December 5
2:10 pm

Report

TNT Tropang Giga	21–14	Terrafirma 3x3

Ynares Sports Arena

=== Knockout stage ===
Purefoods TJ Titans defeated Meralco Bolts 3x3 in the finals, 21–16, to become the fourth leg winners.

==== Bracket ====
Knockout game
B3	San Miguel Beermen	20
C3	Terrafirma 3x3	23

Quarterfinals
A1	Platinum Karaoke	21
C3	Terrafirma 3x3	16
B2	Meralco Bolts 3x3	21
A3	Cavitex Braves	16
B1	Pioneer Pro Tibay	15
C2	Purefoods TJ Titans	20
C1	TNT Tropang Giga	15
A2	Limitless Appmasters	11

Semifinals
A1	Platinum Karaoke	13
B2	Meralco Bolts 3x3	21
C2	Purefoods TJ Titans	21
C1	TNT Tropang Giga	11

Finals
B2	Meralco Bolts 3x3	16
C2	Purefoods TJ Titans	21
Third place
A1	Platinum Karaoke	20
C1	TNT Tropang Giga	21

==== Knockout game ====
December 5
3:00 pm

Report

San Miguel Beermen	20–23	Terrafirma 3x3

Ynares Sports Arena

==== Quarterfinals ====
December 5
3:25 pm

Report

Meralco Bolts 3x3	21–16	Cavitex Braves

Ynares Sports Arena

December 5
3:50 pm

Report

Pioneer Pro Tibay	15–20	Purefoods TJ Titans

Ynares Sports Arena

December 5
4:15 pm

Report

Platinum Karaoke	21–16	Terrafirma 3x3

Ynares Sports Arena

December 5
4:40 pm

Report

TNT Tropang Giga	15–11	Limitless Appmasters

Ynares Sports Arena

==== Semifinals ====
December 5
5:05 pm

Report

Platinum Karaoke	13–21	Meralco Bolts 3x3

Ynares Sports Arena

December 5
5:30 pm

Report

Purefoods TJ Titans	21–11	TNT Tropang Giga

Ynares Sports Arena

==== Third place game ====
December 5
6:10 pm

Report

Platinum Karaoke	20–21	TNT Tropang Giga

Ynares Sports Arena

==== Finals ====
December 5
6:35 pm

Report

Meralco Bolts 3x3	16–21	Purefoods TJ Titans

Ynares Sports Arena

=== Final standings ===
Pos	Team	Pld	W	L	AVG	PF	Tour points
1	Purefoods TJ Titans	6	5	1	19.8	119	100
2	Meralco Bolts 3x3	6	4	2	19.2	115	80
3	TNT Tropang Giga	6	4	2	18.0	108	70
4	Platinum Karaoke	7	5	2	19.7	138	60
Eliminated at the quarterfinals
5	Terrafirma 3x3	5	3	2	18.0	90	50
6	Limitless Appmasters	5	3	2	17.2	86	45
7	Pioneer Pro Tibay	4	2	2	18.0	72	40
8	Cavitex Braves	5	2	3	18.0	90	35
Eliminated at the knockout game
9	San Miguel Beermen	4	2	2	17.5	70	20
Eliminated at the preliminary round
10	Sista Super Sealers	4	1	3	16.5	66	18
11	Barangay Ginebra San Miguel	3	0	3	16.7	50	16
12	NorthPort Batang Pier	3	0	3	11.0	33	14
13	Zamboanga Valientes	4	0	4	10.3	41	12

Source: PBA 3x3

== 5th leg ==
=== Groupings ===
Pool A	Pool B	Pool C
Purefoods TJ Titans (1); Limitless Appmasters (6); Pioneer Pro Tibay (7); NorthPort Batang Pier (12); Zamboanga Valientes (13)	Meralco Bolts 3x3 (2); Terrafirma 3x3 (5); Cavitex Braves (8); Barangay Ginebra San Miguel (11)	TNT Tropang Giga (3); Platinum Karaoke (4); San Miguel Beermen (9); Sista Super Sealers (10)

=== Preliminary round ===
==== Pool A ====
Pos	Team	Pld	W	L	PF	PA	PD	PCT	Qualification
1	Purefoods TJ Titans	4	4	0	82	59	+23	1.000	Quarterfinals
2	Limitless Appmasters	4	3	1	79	49	+30	.750	Quarterfinals
3	Pioneer Pro Tibay	4	2	2	74	78	−4	.500	Quarterfinals
4	NorthPort Batang Pier	4	1	3	70	80	−10	.250	
5	Zamboanga Valientes	4	0	4	44	83	−39	.000	

Source: PBA 3x3
Rules for classification: 1) Wins; Win ratio if unequal number of games; 2) Head-to-head record; 3) Average points per game; 4) Higher seed.

December 11
8:00 am

Report

Purefoods TJ Titans	21–19	NorthPort Batang Pier

Ynares Sports Arena

December 11
8:25 am

Report

Limitless Appmasters	22–7	Zamboanga Valientes

Ynares Sports Arena

December 11
9:40 am

Report

Pioneer Pro Tibay	22–20	NorthPort Batang Pier

Ynares Sports Arena

December 11
10:05 am

Report

Zamboanga Valientes	6–21	Purefoods TJ Titans

Ynares Sports Arena

December 11
11:20 am

Report

Limitless Appmasters	21–13	Pioneer Pro Tibay

Ynares Sports Arena

December 11
11:45 am

Report

NorthPort Batang Pier	21–15	Zamboanga Valientes

Ynares Sports Arena

December 11
1:00 pm

Report

Pioneer Pro Tibay	20–21	Purefoods TJ Titans

Ynares Sports Arena

December 11
1:25 pm

Report

NorthPort Batang Pier	10–22	Limitless Appmasters

Ynares Sports Arena

December 12
8:50 am

Report

Purefoods TJ Titans	19–14	Limitless Appmasters

Ynares Sports Arena

December 12
10:05 am

Report

Zamboanga Valientes	16–19	Pioneer Pro Tibay

Ynares Sports Arena

==== Pool B ====
Pos	Team	Pld	W	L	PF	PA	PD	PCT	Qualification
1	Meralco Bolts 3x3	3	3	0	60	50	+10	1.000	Quarterfinals
2	Terrafirma 3x3	3	2	1	54	50	+4	.667	Quarterfinals
3	Barangay Ginebra San Miguel	3	1	2	50	50	0	.333	Knockout game
4	Cavitex Braves	3	0	3	48	62	−14	.000	

Source: PBA 3x3
Rules for classification: 1) Wins; Win ratio if unequal number of games; 2) Head-to-head record; 3) Average points per game; 4) Higher seed.

December 11
8:50 am

Report

Meralco Bolts 3x3	19–18	Barangay Ginebra San Miguel

Ynares Sports Arena

December 11
10:30 am

Report

Cavitex Braves	19–21	Meralco Bolts 3x3

Ynares Sports Arena

December 11
12:10 pm

Report

Terrafirma 3x3	21–11	Barangay Ginebra San Miguel

Ynares Sports Arena

December 11
2:15 pm

Report

Terrafirma 3x3	20–19	Cavitex Braves

Ynares Sports Arena

December 12
8:25 am

Report

Meralco Bolts 3x3	20–13	Terrafirma 3x3

Ynares Sports Arena

December 12
9:40 am

Report

Barangay Ginebra San Miguel	21–10	Cavitex Braves

Ynares Sports Arena

==== Pool C ====
Pos	Team	Pld	W	L	PF	PA	PD	PCT	Qualification
1	Platinum Karaoke	3	3	0	64	55	+9	1.000	Quarterfinals
2	San Miguel Beermen	3	1	2	55	54	+1	.333 (Note: San Miguel Beermen 18.3 avg. points; TNT Tropang Giga 18.0 avg. points; Sista Super Sealers 17.3 avg. points)	Quarterfinals
3	TNT Tropang Giga	3	1	2	54	57	−3	.333	Knockout game
4	Sista Super Sealers	3	1	2	52	59	−7	.333	

Source: PBA 3x3
Rules for classification: 1) Wins; Win ratio if unequal number of games; 2) Head-to-head record; 3) Average points per game; 4) Higher seed.
Notes:

December 11
9:15 am

Report

Platinum Karaoke	22–20	San Miguel Beermen

Ynares Sports Arena

December 11
10:55 am

Report

TNT Tropang Giga	17–22	Sista Super Sealers

Ynares Sports Arena

December 11
12:35 pm

Report

TNT Tropang Giga	16–21	Platinum Karaoke

Ynares Sports Arena

December 11
1:50 pm

Report

Sista Super Sealers	11–21	San Miguel Beermen

Ynares Sports Arena

December 12
8:00 am

Report

Platinum Karaoke	21–19	Sista Super Sealers

Ynares Sports Arena

December 12
9:15 am

Report

San Miguel Beermen	14–21	TNT Tropang Giga

Ynares Sports Arena

=== Knockout stage ===
Limitless Appmasters defeated TNT Tropang Giga in the finals, 14–13, to become the fifth leg winners.

==== Bracket ====
Knockout game
B3	Barangay Ginebra San Miguel	10
C3	TNT Tropang Giga	21

Quarterfinals
A1	Purefoods TJ Titans	10
C3	TNT Tropang Giga	14
B2	Terrafirma 3x3	19
A3	Pioneer Pro Tibay	17
B1	Meralco Bolts 3x3	20
C2	San Miguel Beermen	14
C1	Platinum Karaoke	14
A2	Limitless Appmasters	15

Semifinals
C3	TNT Tropang Giga	21
B2	Terrafirma 3x3	17
B1	Meralco Bolts 3x3	14
A2	Limitless Appmasters	20

Finals
C3	TNT Tropang Giga	13
A2	Limitless Appmasters	14
Third place
B2	Terrafirma 3x3	21
B1	Meralco Bolts 3x3	10

==== Knockout game ====
December 12
10:30 am

Report

Barangay Ginebra San Miguel	10–21	TNT Tropang Giga

Ynares Sports Arena

==== Quarterfinals ====
December 12
11:00 am

Report

Terrafirma 3x3	19–17	Pioneer Pro Tibay

Ynares Sports Arena

December 12
11:25 am

Report

Meralco Bolts 3x3	20–14	San Miguel Beermen

Ynares Sports Arena

December 12
11:50 am

Report

Purefoods TJ Titans	10–14	TNT Tropang Giga

Ynares Sports Arena

December 12
12:15 pm

Report

Platinum Karaoke	14–15	Limitless Appmasters

Ynares Sports Arena

==== Semifinals ====
December 12
12:40 pm

Report

TNT Tropang Giga	21–17	Terrafirma 3x3

Ynares Sports Arena

December 12
1:05 pm

Report

Meralco Bolts 3x3	14–20	Limitless Appmasters

Ynares Sports Arena

==== Third place game ====
December 12
1:45 pm

Report

Terrafirma 3x3	21–10	Meralco Bolts 3x3

Ynares Sports Arena

==== Finals ====
December 12
2:10 pm

Report

TNT Tropang Giga	13–14	Limitless Appmasters

Ynares Sports Arena

=== Final standings ===
Pos	Team	Pld	W	L	AVG	PF	Tour points
1	Limitless Appmasters	7	6	1	18.3	128	100
2	TNT Tropang Giga	7	4	3	17.6	123	80
3	Terrafirma 3x3	6	4	2	18.5	111	70
4	Meralco Bolts 3x3	6	4	2	17.3	104	60
Eliminated at the quarterfinals
5	Purefoods TJ Titans	5	4	1	18.4	92	50
6	Platinum Karaoke	4	3	1	19.5	78	45
7	Pioneer Pro Tibay	5	2	3	18.2	91	40
8	San Miguel Beermen	4	1	3	17.3	69	35
Eliminated at the knockout game
9	Barangay Ginebra San Miguel	4	1	3	15.0	60	20
Eliminated at the preliminary round
10	Sista Super Sealers	3	1	2	17.3	52	18
11	NorthPort Batang Pier	4	1	3	17.5	70	16
12	Cavitex Braves	3	0	3	16.0	48	14
13	Zamboanga Valientes	4	0	4	11.0	44	12

Source: PBA 3x3

== 6th leg ==
=== Groupings ===
Pool A	Pool B	Pool C
Limitless Appmasters (1); Platinum Karaoke (6); Pioneer Pro Tibay (7); Cavitex Braves (12); Zamboanga Valientes (13)	TNT Tropang Giga (2); Purefoods TJ Titans (5); San Miguel Beermen (8); NorthPort Batang Pier (11)	Terrafirma 3x3 (3); Meralco Bolts 3x3 (4); Barangay Ginebra San Miguel (9); Sista Super Sealers (10)

=== Preliminary round ===
==== Pool A ====
Pos	Team	Pld	W	L	PF	PA	PD	PCT	Qualification
1	Platinum Karaoke	4	4	0	58	40	+18	1.000	Quarterfinals
2	Limitless Appmasters	4	3	1	53	51	+2	.750	Quarterfinals
3	Pioneer Pro Tibay	4	2	2	52	58	−6	.500	Quarterfinals
4	Cavitex Braves	4	1	3	49	63	−14	.250	
5	Zamboanga Valientes	4	0	4	0	0	0	.000	

Source: PBA 3x3
Rules for classification: 1) Wins; Win ratio if unequal number of games; 2) Head-to-head record; 3) Average points per game; 4) Higher seed.

December 20
2:00 pm

Report

Pioneer Pro Tibay	19–21	Limitless Appmasters

Smart Araneta Coliseum

December 20
2:25 pm

Report

Platinum Karaoke	W–0 (Note: Zamboanga Valientes forfeited all of its games during the sixth leg after failing to submit a complete roster due to injuries.)	Zamboanga Valientes

Smart Araneta Coliseum

December 20
3:40 pm

Report

Pioneer Pro Tibay	21–16	Cavitex Braves

Smart Araneta Coliseum

December 20
4:05 pm

Report

Limitless Appmasters	11–16	Platinum Karaoke

Smart Araneta Coliseum

December 20
5:20 pm

Report

Zamboanga Valientes	0–W	Pioneer Pro Tibay

Smart Araneta Coliseum

December 20
5:45 pm

Report

Limitless Appmasters	21–16	Cavitex Braves

Smart Araneta Coliseum

December 20
7:00 pm

Report

Cavitex Braves	W–0	Zamboanga Valientes

Smart Araneta Coliseum

December 20
7:50 pm

Report

Platinum Karaoke	21–12	Pioneer Pro Tibay

Smart Araneta Coliseum

December 21
2:50 pm

Report

Cavitex Braves	17–21	Platinum Karaoke

Smart Araneta Coliseum

December 21
4:05 pm

Report

Zamboanga Valientes	0–W	Limitless Appmasters

Smart Araneta Coliseum

==== Pool B ====
Pos	Team	Pld	W	L	PF	PA	PD	PCT	Qualification
1	San Miguel Beermen	3	3	0	64	51	+13	1.000	Quarterfinals
2	TNT Tropang Giga	3	1	2	55	50	+5	.333 (Note: TNT Tropang Giga 18.3 avg. points; NorthPort Batang Pier 17.0 avg. points; Purefoods TJ Titans 15.0 avg. points)	Quarterfinals
3	NorthPort Batang Pier	3	1	2	51	57	−6	.333	Knockout game
4	Purefoods TJ Titans	3	1	2	45	57	−12	.333	

Source: PBA 3x3
Rules for classification: 1) Wins; Win ratio if unequal number of games; 2) Head-to-head record; 3) Average points per game; 4) Higher seed.
Notes:

December 20
2:50 pm

Report

Purefoods TJ Titans	16–22	San Miguel Beermen

Smart Araneta Coliseum

December 20
4:30 pm

Report

TNT Tropang Giga	15–21	NorthPort Batang Pier

Smart Araneta Coliseum

December 20
6:10 pm

Report

NorthPort Batang Pier	16–21	San Miguel Beermen

Smart Araneta Coliseum

December 20
7:25 pm

Report

TNT Tropang Giga	21–8	Purefoods TJ Titans

Smart Araneta Coliseum

December 21
2:00 pm

Report

Purefoods TJ Titans	21–14	NorthPort Batang Pier

Smart Araneta Coliseum

December 21
3:15 pm

Report

San Miguel Beermen	21–19	TNT Tropang Giga

Smart Araneta Coliseum

==== Pool C ====
Pos	Team	Pld	W	L	PF	PA	PD	PCT	Qualification
1	Meralco Bolts 3x3	3	2	1	59	50	+9	.667 (Note: Meralco Bolts 3x3 1–0 Barangay Ginebra San Miguel)	Quarterfinals
2	Barangay Ginebra San Miguel	3	2	1	52	53	−1	.667	Quarterfinals
3	Terrafirma 3x3	3	1	2	52	61	−9	.333 (Note: Terrafirma 3x3 1–0 Sista Super Sealers)	Knockout game
4	Sista Super Sealers	3	1	2	59	58	+1	.333	

Source: PBA 3x3
Rules for classification: 1) Wins; Win ratio if unequal number of games; 2) Head-to-head record; 3) Average points per game; 4) Higher seed.
Notes:

December 20
3:15 pm

Report

Terrafirma 3x3	21–19	Sista Super Sealers

Smart Araneta Coliseum

December 20
4:55 pm

Report

Meralco Bolts 3x3	21–11	Barangay Ginebra San Miguel

Smart Araneta Coliseum

December 20
6:35 pm

Report

Sista Super Sealers	19–20	Barangay Ginebra San Miguel

Smart Araneta Coliseum

December 20
8:15 pm

Report

Terrafirma 3x3	18–21	Meralco Bolts 3x3

Smart Araneta Coliseum

December 21
2:25 pm

Report

Meralco Bolts 3x3	17–21	Sista Super Sealers

Smart Araneta Coliseum

December 21
3:40 pm

Report

Barangay Ginebra San Miguel	21–13	Terrafirma 3x3

Smart Araneta Coliseum

=== Knockout stage ===
Limitless Appmasters defeated TNT Tropang Giga in the finals, 21–18, to become the sixth leg winners.

==== Bracket ====
Knockout game
B3	NorthPort Batang Pier	14
C3	Terrafirma 3x3	21

Quarterfinals
A1	Platinum Karaoke	17
C3	Terrafirma 3x3	15
B2	TNT Tropang Giga	21
A3	Pioneer Pro Tibay	17
B1	San Miguel Beermen	21
C2	Barangay Ginebra San Miguel	18
C1	Meralco Bolts 3x3	15
A2	Limitless Appmasters	22

Semifinals
A1	Platinum Karaoke	15
B2	TNT Tropang Giga	19
B1	San Miguel Beermen	16
A2	Limitless Appmasters	19

Finals
B2	TNT Tropang Giga	18
A2	Limitless Appmasters	21
Third place
A1	Platinum Karaoke	21
B1	San Miguel Beermen	13

==== Knockout game ====
December 21
4:35 pm

Report

NorthPort Batang Pier	14–21	Terrafirma 3x3

Smart Araneta Coliseum

==== Quarterfinals ====
December 21
5:05 pm

Report

TNT Tropang Giga	21–17	Pioneer Pro Tibay

Smart Araneta Coliseum

December 21
5:30 pm

Report

San Miguel Beermen	21–18	Barangay Ginebra San Miguel

Smart Araneta Coliseum

December 21
5:55 pm

Report

Platinum Karaoke	17–15	Terrafirma 3x3

Smart Araneta Coliseum

December 21
6:20 pm

Report

Meralco Bolts 3x3	15–22	Limitless Appmasters

Smart Araneta Coliseum

==== Semifinals ====
December 21
6:45 pm

Report

Platinum Karaoke	15–19	TNT Tropang Giga

Smart Araneta Coliseum

December 21
7:10 pm

Report

San Miguel Beermen	16–19	Limitless Appmasters

Smart Araneta Coliseum

==== Third place game ====
December 21
7:50 pm

Report

Platinum Karaoke	21–13	San Miguel Beermen

Smart Araneta Coliseum

==== Finals ====
December 21
8:15 pm

Report

TNT Tropang Giga	18–21	Limitless Appmasters

Smart Araneta Coliseum

=== Final standings ===
Pos	Team	Pld	W	L	AVG	PF	Tour points
1	Limitless Appmasters	7	6	1	19.2	115	100
2	TNT Tropang Giga	6	3	3	18.8	113	80
3	Platinum Karaoke	7	6	1	18.5	111	70
4	San Miguel Beermen	6	4	2	19.0	114	60
Eliminated at the quarterfinals
5	Meralco Bolts 3x3	4	2	2	18.5	74	50
6	Barangay Ginebra San Miguel	4	2	2	17.5	70	45
7	Terrafirma 3x3	5	2	3	17.6	88	40
8	Pioneer Pro Tibay	5	2	3	17.3	69	35
Eliminated at the knockout game
9	NorthPort Batang Pier	4	1	3	16.3	65	20
Eliminated at the preliminary round
10	Sista Super Sealers	3	1	2	19.7	59	18
11	Purefoods TJ Titans	3	1	2	15.0	45	16
12	Cavitex Braves	4	1	3	16.3	49	14
13	Zamboanga Valientes	4	0	4	0.0	0	12

Source: PBA 3x3

== Legs summary ==
Pos	Team	1st leg	2nd leg	3rd leg	4th leg	5th leg	6th leg	Pts	Qualification
1	Meralco Bolts 3x3	2nd	1st	5th	2nd	4th	5th	420	Qualification to Grand Finals quarterfinal round
2	TNT Tropang Giga	1st	3rd	9th	3rd	2nd	2nd	420	Qualification to Grand Finals quarterfinal round
3	Limitless Appmasters	11th	4th	7th	6th	1st	1st	361	Qualification to Grand Finals quarterfinal round
4	Platinum Karaoke	4th	2nd	6th	4th	6th	3rd	360	Qualification to Grand Finals quarterfinal round
5	Terrafirma 3x3	5th	6th	3rd	5th	3rd	7th	325	Qualification to Grand Finals preliminary round
6	Purefoods TJ Titans	3rd	9th	4th	1st	5th	11th	316	Qualification to Grand Finals preliminary round
7	Pioneer Pro Tibay	10th	7th	2nd	7th	7th	8th	253	Qualification to Grand Finals preliminary round
8	Sista Super Sealers	12th	5th	1st	10th	10th	10th	218	Qualification to Grand Finals preliminary round
9	San Miguel Beermen	7th	8th	11th	9th	8th	4th	206	Qualification to Grand Finals preliminary round
10	Barangay Ginebra San Miguel	8th	11th	8th	11th	9th	6th	167	Qualification to Grand Finals preliminary round
11	Cavitex Braves	6th	10th	12th	8th	12th	12th	140	
12	NorthPort Batang Pier	9th	13th	10th	12th	11th	9th	100	
13	Zamboanga Valientes	13th	12th	13th	13th	13th	13th	74	

Source: PBA 3x3

== Grand Finals ==
=== Preliminary round ===
==== Pool A ====
Pos	Team	Pld	W	L	PF	PA	PD	PCT	Qualification
1	San Miguel Beermen	2	1	1	38	36	+2	.500 (Note: San Miguel Beermen 19.0 avg. points; Terrafirma 3x3 17.5 avg. points; Sista Super Sealers 16.5 avg. points)	Quarterfinals
2	Terrafirma 3x3	2	1	1	35	35	0	.500	Quarterfinals
3	Sista Super Sealers	2	1	1	33	35	−2	.500	

Source: PBA 3x3
Rules for classification: 1) Wins; Win ratio if unequal number of games; 2) Head-to-head record; 3) Average points per game; 4) Higher seed.
Notes:

December 29
1:00 pm

Report

Terrafirma 3x3	21–17	San Miguel Beermen

Smart Araneta Coliseum

December 29
2:00 pm

Report

Sista Super Sealers	15–21	San Miguel Beermen

Smart Araneta Coliseum

December 29
3:00 pm

Report

Terrafirma 3x3	14–18	Sista Super Sealers

Smart Araneta Coliseum

==== Pool B ====
Pos	Team	Pld	W	L	PF	PA	PD	PCT	Qualification
1	Pioneer Pro Tibay	2	2	0	43	36	+7	1.000	Quarterfinals
2	Purefoods TJ Titans	2	1	1	41	31	+10	.500	Quarterfinals
3	Barangay Ginebra San Miguel	2	0	2	25	42	−17	.000	

Source: PBA 3x3
Rules for classification: 1) Wins; Win ratio if unequal number of games; 2) Head-to-head record; 3) Average points per game; 4) Higher seed.

December 29
1:25 pm

Report

Purefoods TJ Titans	21–9	Barangay Ginebra San Miguel

Smart Araneta Coliseum

December 29
2:25 pm

Report

Pioneer Pro Tibay	21–16	Barangay Ginebra San Miguel

Smart Araneta Coliseum

December 29
3:25 pm

Report

Purefoods TJ Titans	20–22	Pioneer Pro Tibay

Smart Araneta Coliseum

=== Knockout stage ===
==== Bracket ====
Seed refers to the position of the team after six legs. Letter and number inside parentheses denotes the pool letter and pool position of the team, respectively, after the preliminary round of the Grand Finals.

Quarterfinals
1	Meralco Bolts 3x3	15
5 (A2)	Terrafirma 3x3	19
7 (B1)	Pioneer Pro Tibay	15
4	Platinum Karaoke	21
3	Limitless Appmasters	21
9 (A1)	San Miguel Beermen	15
6 (B2)	Purefoods TJ Titans	13
2	TNT Tropang Giga	18

Semifinals
5 (A2)	Terrafirma 3x3	10
4	Platinum Karaoke	21
3	Limitless Appmasters	21
2	TNT Tropang Giga	16

Finals
4	Platinum Karaoke	16
3	Limitless Appmasters	18
Third place
5 (A2)	Terrafirma 3x3	14
2	TNT Tropang Giga	22

==== Quarterfinals ====
December 29
4:00 pm

Report

Meralco Bolts 3x3	15–19	Terrafirma 3x3

Smart Araneta Coliseum

December 29
4:25 pm

Report

Pioneer Pro Tibay	15–21	Platinum Karaoke

Smart Araneta Coliseum

December 29
4:50 pm

Report

Limitless Appmasters	21–15	San Miguel Beermen

Smart Araneta Coliseum

December 29
5:15 pm

Report

Purefoods TJ Titans	13–18	TNT Tropang Giga

Smart Araneta Coliseum

==== Semifinals ====
December 29
5:40 pm

Report

Terrafirma 3x3	10–21	Platinum Karaoke

Smart Araneta Coliseum

December 29
6:05 pm

Report

Limitless Appmasters	21–16	TNT Tropang Giga

Smart Araneta Coliseum

==== Third place game ====
December 29
6:45 pm

Report

Terrafirma 3x3	14–22	TNT Tropang Giga

Smart Araneta Coliseum

==== Finals ====
December 29
7:10 pm

Report

Platinum Karaoke	16–18	Limitless Appmasters

Smart Araneta Coliseum
