= ABL 3x3 International Champions Cup =

Basketball tournament in Southeast Asia

- Current season, competition or edition: 2022 ABL 3x3 International Champions Cup
- Sport: 3x3 basketball
- Founded: 2022
- Country: FIBA members
- Continent: FIBA Asia
- Most recent champions: (Indonesia) Indonesian Patriots A (men) (Vietnam) VN Red and Gold (women)

The ABL 3x3 International Champions Cup, also known as the ABL 3x3 Cup, is a 3x3 basketball tournament held by the organizers of the ASEAN Basketball League.

== Background ==
The ASEAN Basketball League was launched in 2009 as a traditional 5-a-side basketball league for Southeast Asian teams. The ABL would hold tournaments until 2020 when it was disrupted by the COVID-19 pandemic. As a precursor to resume the ABL in September 2022, the ABL 3x3 Cup was organized. The competition is not intended to be a one-off event and is part of the ABL's plans to expand to 3x3 basketball.

The inaugural edition was held from 16 to 17 April 2022 in Bali, Indonesia. Both men's and women's competitions were held.

== Summary ==
=== Men's ===
Year	Hosts	Final			Third place match		
Year	Hosts	Champions	Score	Runners-up	Third place	Score	Fourth place
2022; Details	(Indonesia); Bali	Indonesia Patriots A	21–15	(Malaysia) Harimau Malaya	(Philippines) Platinum Karaoke	15–8	(Vietnam) VN Red and Gold

=== Women's ===
Year	Hosts	Final			Third place match		
Year	Hosts	Champions	Score	Runners-up	Third place	Score	Fourth place
2022; Details	(Indonesia); Bali	(Vietnam) VN Red and Gold	14–7	Louvre Indonesia Angels	(Indonesia) Team Elite	17–6	(India) Delhi 3BL
