= 2021 PBA 3x3 season =

Inaugural PBA 3x3 season

- Duration: November 20, 2021 – July 3, 2022
- Teams: 13
- TV partner(s): Local: One Sports; TV5 (selected legs and grand finals only); One Sports; PBA Rush (HD); International: AksyonTV International; Online: GigaPlay
- 1st Conference champions: Limitless Appmasters
- 1st Conference runners-up: Platinum Karaoke
- 2nd Conference champions: Pioneer Pro Tibay
- 2nd Conference runners-up: Sista Super Sealers
- 3rd Conference champions: TNT Tropang Giga
- 3rd Conference runners-up: Purefoods TJ Titans

Seasons
- N/A 2022–23 →

The 2021 PBA 3x3 season was the inaugural season of the PBA 3x3, the 3x3 basketball league of the Philippine Basketball Association.

== Postponement ==
The inaugural season was supposed to be held in 2020, with all 12 franchise teams of the main PBA to field their own teams. Mighty Sports and Dunkin' Donuts reportedly were interesting in also fielding teams in the PBA 3x3. The inaugural season was supposed to start with the 3×3 Philippine Cup in March 2020, but was postponed to 2021 by June 2020 due to the COVID-19 pandemic with the PBA preoccupied with plans to resume the season of its main league during that time.

The PBA 3x3 inaugural season was initially scheduled to be held in parallel with the 2021 PBA season, which opened on April 11, 2021, but was further postponed. The inaugural PBA 3x3 season commenced on November 20, 2021.

== Teams ==
All 12 franchise teams of the main 5-a-side Philippine Basketball Association are eligible to field a 3x3 team for the 2021 PBA 3x3 season. The Alaska Aces and Blackwater Bossing decided not to field a team, while three guest teams (Pioneer, Platinum, and Zamboanga) participated. Another guest team, Master Sardines, joined before the second conference to become the 14th team of the tournament. The Zamboanga Valientes took a leave of absence during the second conference, but returned during the third conference.

Four of the participating franchising teams Magnolia Hotshots, NLEX Road Warriors, Phoenix Super LPG Fuel Masters and Rain or Shine Elasto Painters announced in November they would be competing in the PBA 3x3 under different team names; Purefoods TJ Titans, Cavitex Braves, Limitless Appmasters, and Sista Super Sealers respectively.

Team	Company	Coach
Barangay Ginebra San Miguel	Ginebra San Miguel, Inc.	Kirk Collier
Cavitex Braves	Metro Pacific Investments Corporation	Borgie Hermenda; Emman Monfort
Limitless Appmasters	Phoenix Petroleum Philippines, Inc.	Willy Wilson
Master Sardines Fishing Champs (Note: Universal Canning was set to enter a team featuring their brand Master Sardines, but later withdrew. They were replaced by a team of Vismay International Corporation, which is Platinum Karaoke. Master Sardines eventually joined before the second conference.)	Universal Canning, Inc.	Victor Ycasiano
Meralco Bolts 3x3	Manila Electric Company	Patrick Fran
NorthPort Batang Pier	Sultan 900 Capital, Inc.	Alfredo Jarencio II
Pioneer Pro Tibay (Note: Phenom Sportswear was supposed to enter with a co-branding of former PBA Developmental League team BRT Sumisip. However they were not among the final roster of participating teams. They were subsequently replaced by a team of Pioneer Epoxy Adhesives Inc. under the monicker of Pioneer Pro Tibay.)	Pioneer Epoxy Adhesives Inc.	Lester Del Rosario
Platinum Karaoke	Vismay International Corporation	Anton Altamirano
Purefoods TJ Titans	San Miguel Food and Beverage, Inc.	Tonyboy Espinosa
San Miguel Beermen	San Miguel Brewery, Inc.	Boycie Zamar
Sista Super Sealers	Asian Coatings Philippines, Inc.	Juven Formancil
Terrafirma 3x3	Terrafirma Realty Development Corporation	Raymond Tiongco; James Tolentino
TNT Tropang Giga	Smart Communications	Mau Belen
Zamboanga Valientes	MLV Group	

== Format ==
The inaugural PBA 3x3 season had three tournaments or conference. Each conference had six two-day legs and a grand final. The 13 teams were divided into three pools, with pool A having five teams while pools B and C having four each. Teams within their pools play in a single round-robin format. The top three teams of pool A and the top two teams of pools B and C directly qualify for the quarterfinals. The third-best teams of pools B and C played in a knockout game prior to the quarterfinals. The knockout stage is a single-elimination tournament and a third place game is also held. The winner of each leg gets ₱100,000, the runner-up gets ₱50,000, while the third placed team gets ₱30,000. The seedings and pool compositions for each leg are based on the results of the preceding leg. For the third conference, there were 14 teams divided into four pools, with pools A and C having four teams while pools B and D having three each. The top two teams of each pool advanced to the quarterfinals.

After six legs, the cumulative standings were calculated and the top four teams directly qualified for the quarterfinals of the Grand Finals. The fifth to tenth-placed teams qualified for the preliminary round of the Grand Finals. The bottom teams were not qualified for the Grand Finals. The Grand Champion gets ₱750,000, the runner-up gets ₱250,000, while the third placed team gets ₱100,000.

== Transactions ==
=== Coaching changes ===
Coaching changes
Team	In-season		Ref.
Second Conference
Master Sardines Fishing Champs	Victor Ycasiano	Hubert De Los Santos	
Terrafirma 3x3	Raymond Tiongco	Joe Lipa	

== First conference ==
The conference started on November 20, 2021, and ended on December 29.

=== Legs summary ===
Pos	Team	1st leg	2nd leg	3rd leg	4th leg	5th leg	6th leg	Pts	Qualification
1	Meralco Bolts 3x3	2nd	1st	5th	2nd	4th	5th	420	Qualification to Grand Finals quarterfinal round
2	TNT Tropang Giga	1st	3rd	9th	3rd	2nd	2nd	420	Qualification to Grand Finals quarterfinal round
3	Limitless Appmasters	11th	4th	7th	6th	1st	1st	361	Qualification to Grand Finals quarterfinal round
4	Platinum Karaoke	4th	2nd	6th	4th	6th	3rd	360	Qualification to Grand Finals quarterfinal round
5	Terrafirma 3x3	5th	6th	3rd	5th	3rd	7th	325	Qualification to Grand Finals preliminary round
6	Purefoods TJ Titans	3rd	9th	4th	1st	5th	11th	316	Qualification to Grand Finals preliminary round
7	Pioneer Pro Tibay	10th	7th	2nd	7th	7th	8th	253	Qualification to Grand Finals preliminary round
8	Sista Super Sealers	12th	5th	1st	10th	10th	10th	218	Qualification to Grand Finals preliminary round
9	San Miguel Beermen	7th	8th	11th	9th	8th	4th	206	Qualification to Grand Finals preliminary round
10	Barangay Ginebra San Miguel	8th	11th	8th	11th	9th	6th	167	Qualification to Grand Finals preliminary round
11	Cavitex Braves	6th	10th	12th	8th	12th	12th	140	
12	NorthPort Batang Pier	9th	13th	10th	12th	11th	9th	100	
13	Zamboanga Valientes	13th	12th	13th	13th	13th	13th	74	

Source: PBA 3x3

=== Grand Finals ===
==== Preliminary round ====
===== Pool A =====
Pos	Team	Pld	W	L	PF	PA	PD	PCT	Qualification
1	San Miguel Beermen	2	1	1	38	36	+2	.500 (Note: San Miguel Beermen 19.0 avg. points; Terrafirma 3x3 17.5 avg. points; Sista Super Sealers 16.5 avg. points)	Quarterfinals
2	Terrafirma 3x3	2	1	1	35	35	0	.500	Quarterfinals
3	Sista Super Sealers	2	1	1	33	35	−2	.500	

Source: PBA 3x3
Rules for classification: 1) Wins; Win ratio if unequal number of games; 2) Head-to-head record; 3) Average points per game; 4) Higher seed.

===== Pool B =====
Pos	Team	Pld	W	L	PF	PA	PD	PCT	Qualification
1	Pioneer Pro Tibay	2	2	0	43	36	+7	1.000	Quarterfinals
2	Purefoods TJ Titans	2	1	1	41	31	+10	.500	Quarterfinals
3	Barangay Ginebra San Miguel	2	0	2	25	42	−17	.000	

Source: PBA 3x3
Rules for classification: 1) Wins; Win ratio if unequal number of games; 2) Head-to-head record; 3) Average points per game; 4) Higher seed.

==== Knockout stage ====
===== Bracket =====
Seed refers to the position of the team after six legs. Letter and number inside parentheses denotes the pool letter and pool position of the team, respectively, after the preliminary round of the Grand Finals.

Quarterfinals
1	Meralco Bolts 3x3	15
5 (A2)	Terrafirma 3x3	19
7 (B1)	Pioneer Pro Tibay	15
4	Platinum Karaoke	21
3	Limitless Appmasters	21
9 (A1)	San Miguel Beermen	15
6 (B2)	Purefoods TJ Titans	13
2	TNT Tropang Giga	18

Semifinals
5 (A2)	Terrafirma 3x3	10
4	Platinum Karaoke	21
3	Limitless Appmasters	21
2	TNT Tropang Giga	16

Finals
4	Platinum Karaoke	16
3	Limitless Appmasters	18
Third place
5 (A2)	Terrafirma 3x3	14
2	TNT Tropang Giga	22

== Second conference ==
The second conference was originally scheduled to start on January 8, 2022, but was suspended after Metro Manila was put on Alert Level 3 due to the rising COVID-19 cases. The conference started on February 19 and ended on April 27.

=== Legs summary ===
Pos	Team	1st leg	2nd leg	3rd leg	4th leg	5th leg	6th leg	Pts	Qualification
1	Limitless Appmasters	4th	3rd	1st	2nd	1st	7th	450	Qualification to Grand Finals quarterfinal round
2	TNT Tropang Giga	1st	6th	2nd	3rd	2nd	4th	435	Qualification to Grand Finals quarterfinal round
3	Meralco Bolts 3x3	2nd	5th	3rd	1st	6th	5th	395	Qualification to Grand Finals quarterfinal round
4	San Miguel Beermen	6th	1st	7th	4th	8th	1st	380	Qualification to Grand Finals quarterfinal round
5	Pioneer Pro Tibay	13th	4th	8th	7th	5th	2nd	277	Qualification to Grand Finals preliminary round
6	Barangay Ginebra San Miguel	3rd	2nd	9th	5th	13th	8th	267	Qualification to Grand Finals preliminary round
7	Platinum Karaoke	5th	7th	11th	6th	3rd	6th	266	Qualification to Grand Finals preliminary round
8	Purefoods TJ Titans	8th	8th	10th	9th	4th	3rd	238	Qualification to Grand Finals preliminary round
9	Sista Super Sealers	7th	10th	5th	11th	7th	11th	180	Qualification to Grand Finals preliminary round
10	Terrafirma 3x3	11th	12th	4th	10th	11th	13th	136	Qualification to Grand Finals preliminary round
11	Cavitex Braves	9th	11th	6th	12th	10th	9th	133	
12	Master Sardines Fishing Champs	12th	13th	12th	8th	9th	12th	109	
13	NorthPort Batang Pier	10th	9th	13th	13th	12th	10th	94	

Source: PBA 3x3

=== Grand Finals ===
==== Preliminary round ====
===== Pool A =====
Pos	Team	Pld	W	L	PF	PA	PD	Qualification
1	Sista Super Sealers	2	2	0	39	36	+3	Quarterfinals
2	Pioneer Pro Tibay	2	1	1	38	35	+3	Quarterfinals
3	Purefoods TJ Titans	2	0	2	35	41	−6	

Source: PBA 3x3
Rules for classification: 1) Wins; Win ratio if unequal number of games; 2) Head-to-head record; 3) Average points per game; 4) Higher seed.

===== Pool B =====
Pos	Team	Pld	W	L	PF	PA	PD	Qualification
1	Barangay Ginebra San Miguel	2	2	0	44	37	+7	Quarterfinals
2	Terrafirma 3x3	2	1	1	39	41	−2	Quarterfinals
3	Platinum Karaoke	2	0	2	38	43	−5	

Source: PBA 3x3
Rules for classification: 1) Wins; Win ratio if unequal number of games; 2) Head-to-head record; 3) Average points per game; 4) Higher seed.

==== Knockout stage ====
===== Bracket =====
Seed refers to the position of the team after six legs. Letter and number inside parentheses denotes the pool letter and pool position of the team, respectively, after the preliminary round of the Grand Finals.

Quarterfinals
1	Limitless Appmasters	14
5 (A2)	Pioneer Pro Tibay	16
6 (B1)	Barangay Ginebra San Miguel	21
4	San Miguel Beermen	12
3	Meralco Bolts 3x3	15
9 (A1)	Sista Super Sealers	16
10 (B2)	Terrafirma 3x3	17
2	TNT Tropang Giga	18

Semifinals
5 (A2)	Pioneer Pro Tibay	16
6 (B1)	Barangay Ginebra San Miguel	14
9 (A1)	Sista Super Sealers	13
2	TNT Tropang Giga	12

Finals
5 (A2)	Pioneer Pro Tibay	12
9 (A1)	Sista Super Sealers	10
Third place
6 (B1)	Barangay Ginebra San Miguel	21
2	TNT Tropang Giga	16

== Third conference ==
The conference started on May 21, 2022, and ended on July 3.

=== Legs summary ===
Pos	Team	1st leg	2nd leg	3rd leg	4th leg	5th leg	6th leg	Pts	Qualification
1	TNT Tropang Giga	1st	7th	1st	1st	2nd	2nd	500	Qualification to Grand Finals quarterfinal round
2	Meralco Bolts 3x3	4th	1st	4th	8th	5th	3rd	375	Qualification to Grand Finals quarterfinal round
3	Purefoods TJ Titans	3rd	5th	2nd	12th	7th	1st	354	Qualification to Grand Finals quarterfinal round
4	San Miguel Beermen	7th	10th	7th	3rd	1st	5th	318	Qualification to Grand Finals quarterfinal round
5	Cavitex Braves	6th	2nd	10th	5th	3rd	8th	298	Qualification to Grand Finals preliminary round
6	Platinum Karaoke	5th	6th	3rd	6th	6th	7th	295	Qualification to Grand Finals preliminary round
7	Terrafirma 3x3	9th	4th	13th	2nd	4th	13th	244	Qualification to Grand Finals preliminary round
8	Limitless Appmasters	10th	8th	5th	4th	9th	4th	243	Qualification to Grand Finals preliminary round
9	Barangay Ginebra San Miguel	2nd	3rd	14th	10th	8th	11th	230	Qualification to Grand Finals preliminary round
10	Sista Super Sealers	8th	13th	6th	9th	12th	6th	171	Qualification to Grand Finals preliminary round
11	Pioneer Pro Tibay	11th	11th	9th	7th	14th	12th	117	
12	Master Sardines Fishing Champs	13th	12th	8th	13th	13th	9th	105	
13	NorthPort Batang Pier	14th	9th	12th	11th	11th	10th	95	
14	Zamboanga Valientes	12th	14th	11th	14th	10th	14th	81	

Source: PBA 3x3

=== Grand Finals ===
==== Preliminary round ====
===== Pool A =====
Pos	Team	Pld	W	L	PF	PA	PD	PCT	Qualification
1	Limitless Appmasters	2	2	0	42	35	+7	1.000	Quarterfinals
2	Barangay Ginebra San Miguel	2	1	1	37	36	+1	.500	Quarterfinals
3	Cavitex Braves	2	0	2	35	43	−8	.000	

Source: PBA 3x3
Rules for classification: 1) Wins; Win ratio if unequal number of games; 2) Head-to-head record; 3) Average points per game; 4) Higher seed.

===== Pool B =====
Pos	Team	Pld	W	L	PF	PA	PD	PCT	Qualification
1	Platinum Karaoke	2	2	0	38	22	+16	1.000	Quarterfinals
2	Sista Super Sealers	2	1	1	29	27	+2	.500	Quarterfinals
3	Terrafirma 3x3	2	0	2	18	36	−18	.000	

Source: PBA 3x3
Rules for classification: 1) Wins; Win ratio if unequal number of games; 2) Head-to-head record; 3) Average points per game; 4) Higher seed.

==== Knockout stage ====
===== Bracket =====
Seed refers to the position of the team after six legs. Letter and number inside parentheses denotes the pool letter and pool position of the team, respectively, after the preliminary round of the Grand Finals.

Quarterfinals
1	TNT Tropang Giga	21
9 (A2)	Barangay Ginebra San Miguel	14
6 (B1)	Platinum Karaoke	8
4	San Miguel Beermen	10
3	Purefoods TJ Titans	18
8 (A1)	Limitless Appmasters	16
10 (B2)	Sista Super Sealers	18
2	Meralco Bolts 3x3	12

Semifinals
1	TNT Tropang Giga	21
4	San Miguel Beermen	15
3	Purefoods TJ Titans	21
10 (B2)	Sista Super Sealers	19

Finals
1	TNT Tropang Giga	21
3	Purefoods TJ Titans	19
Third place
4	San Miguel Beermen	20
10 (B2)	Sista Super Sealers	21
