= Platinum Karaoke =

- Leagues: PBA 3x3
- Founded: 2021
- Folded: 2023
- Team colors: Black, red, white
- Company: Vismay International Corporation
- Head coach: Anton Altamirano

Platinum Karaoke is a Philippine 3x3 basketball team which competes in the PBA 3x3, organized by the Philippines' top-flight professional league, Philippine Basketball Association.

== History ==
The Platinum Karaoke entered the PBA 3x3 in 2021 as a guest team. It is owned by Vismay International Corporation, a manufacturer of karaoke systems and accessories. With their roster filled with 3x3 veterans, they were considered as the favorites to win the inaugural 2021 PBA 3x3 title. Platinum finished second to the Limitless Appmasters in the first conference of the grand finals.

Platinum participated in the 2022 ABL 3x3 International Champions Cup where it placed third in the men's competition.

They would take a leave of absence in the 2023–24 season. The team would never play again in the league which disbanded in 2024.

== Final roster ==
Platinum Karaoke roster
Players
Coaches

Pos.	No.	Nat.	Name	Ht.	Wt.	Age
		(Philippines)	Sazon, Yves
		(Philippines)	Andrada, Yutien
		(Philippines)	Bates, Brandon
		(Philippines)	Salva, Nico
		(Philippines)	Tumalip, Terrence
		(Philippines)	Banal, Raphael

Head coach

Anton Altamirano

Legend

- (C) Team captain
- Injured

- Roster
