= Limitless Appmasters =

Philippine 3x3 basketball team

- Leagues: PBA 3x3
- Founded: 2021
- Folded: 2022
- Team colors: Grey, orange, black, white
- Company: Phoenix Petroleum Philippines, Inc.
- Ownership: Dennis Uy
- Championships: 1 championship 2021 First conference

The Limitless Appmasters were a Philippine 3x3 basketball team which competed in the PBA 3x3, organized by the Philippines' top-flight professional league, Philippine Basketball Association (PBA). The team is affiliated with the Phoenix Super LPG Fuel Masters, a member franchise of the PBA.

== History ==
The Phoenix Super LPG Fuel Masters are among the participating PBA franchise teams in the inaugural 2021 PBA 3x3 season. Instead of competing under the same name as their mother team, the 3x3 team competed under the name "Limitless Appmasters", named after Phoenix Petroleum's mobile app for its rewards and voucher system.

The Appmasters became the first-ever PBA 3x3 grand champions when it clinched the title of the PBA 3x3 first conference. Consequentially, their players were named as the Philippines' representatives for the men's 3x3 event for the 2021 Southeast Asian Games.

They would take a leave of absence in the 2022–23 season. The team would never play again in the league which disbanded in 2024.
