= Laperal White House =

Landmark in Baguio, Philippines

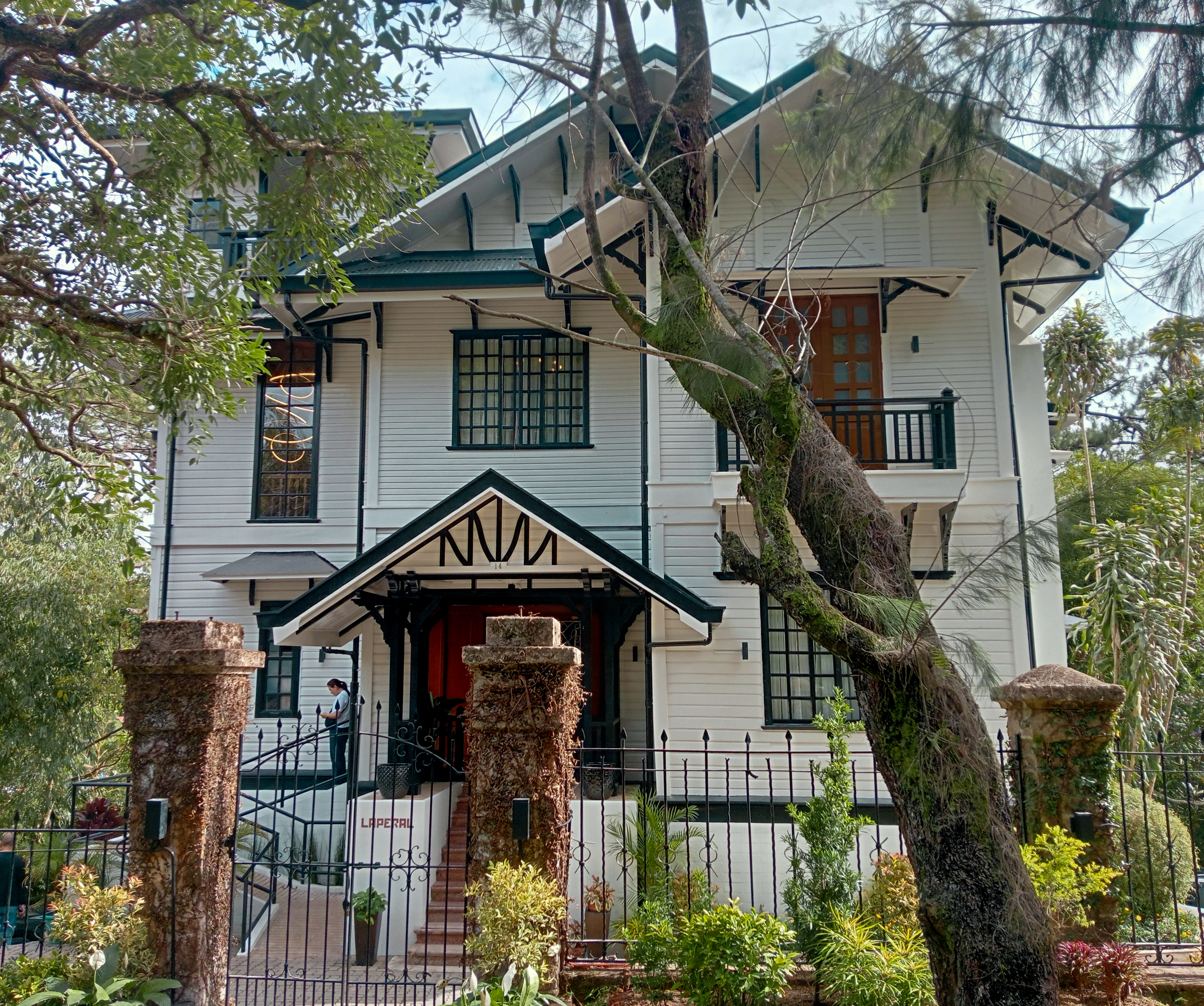
- The house in 2022

- Location in Luzon Location in the Philippines
- Alternative names: Laperal Guesthouse

General information
- Status: Completed
- Architectural style: Victorian architecture
- Location: Baguio, Philippines
- Coordinates: 16°24′40″N 120°36′17″E
- Current tenants: Ifugao Bamboo Carving Gallery
- Completed: 1930s

Technical details
- Material: Narra and yakal wood

The Laperal Guesthouse, popularly known as Laperal White House, is a building in Baguio, Philippines which housed a museum and is now the home of a new restaurant called Joseph's (owned by the older brother of ABS-CBN News broadcast journalist, Bernadette Sembrano).

== History ==
The house was built by Roberto Laperal in 1928. The house is made of narra and yakal wood, designed in Victorian-American style with its wooden planks and gables and steep roof. The clan heads, Roberto and Victorina Laperal made the house as their vacation home.

The architecture itself of the Laperal White House in Baguio City is strong evidence for a 1920s construction date rather than 1930s.

=== Architectural indicators of a 1920s origin ===
1. Victorian-influenced American colonial style
  - The steep gabled roof, wood clapboard siding, and large wraparound veranda are transitional features common in 1920s Baguio houses built during the last phase of the American colonial resort expansion.
  - By the 1930s, upper-class Manila and Baguio homes leaned more toward Art Deco or simplified Mission Revival—which the Laperal White House clearly predates.
2. Material and craftsmanship
  - The heavy use of narra and yakal, plus solid wooden staircases and hand-carved balustrades, was characteristic of pre-Depression craftsmanship (before 1930, when hardwood costs rose).
  - The ornate detailing seen in window frames and railings was already fading out of style by the early 1930s.
3. Context in Baguio's development
  - The 1920s saw an explosion of summer houses for Manila’s elite on Leonard Wood Road, South Drive, and Outlook Drive—often commissioned between 1924 and 1929.
  - After 1931, new constructions were fewer due to the Great Depression and reduced travel spending.

Sample of 1920s Victorian-style house can be found here

The house was inherited by the eldest son of Roberto Laperal, Roberto Guison Laperal Jr. who was married to Purificacion Ramos Manotok. The house was then sold by Roberto Laperal Jr. and his wife, Purificacion Manotok Laperal. The house withstood many natural and man-made disasters, such as the 1990 Luzon earthquake.

Chinese Filipino billionaire tycoon Lucio Tan purchased the property in 2007 but never stayed in the place during his trips to Baguio. He instead had it renovated and refurbished with proper maintenance then made it into a tourist attraction. From then on, the house was opened to the public.

In 2013, the tycoon's Tan Yan Kee Foundation transformed the house into a Bamboo Foundation museum which houses Filipino artworks made of bamboo and wood.

== In popular culture ==
According to believers, the house is haunted due to its involvement in the Japanese occupation during World War II, serving as an imperial forces garrison that doubled as a Kempeitai sub-station and comfort women station. The 2010 horror movie White House featured the building. It was a studio setting for the 1996 Halloween special episode of Magandang Gabi... Bayan.

== Gallery ==
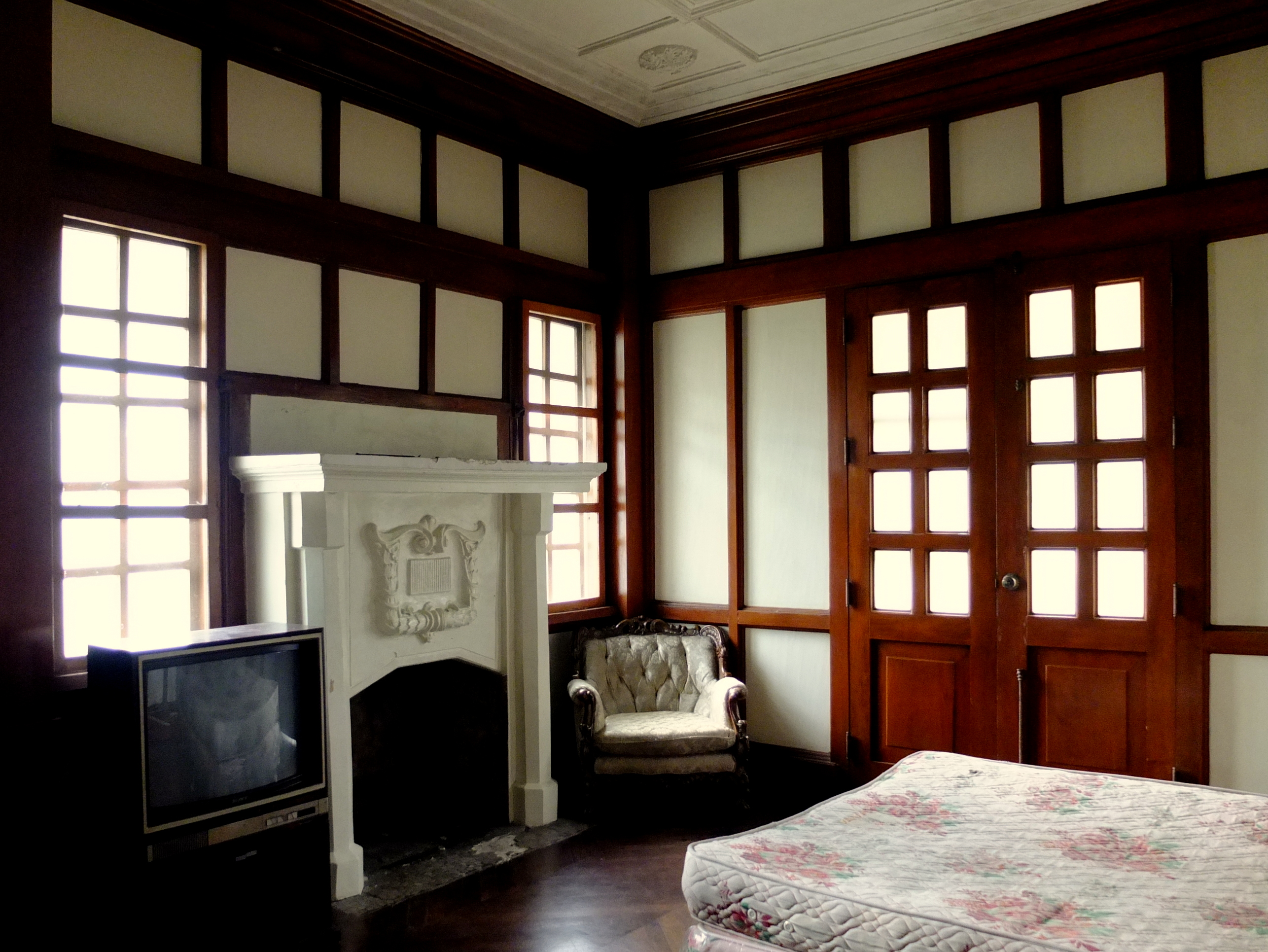
Master's bedroom of Laperal House

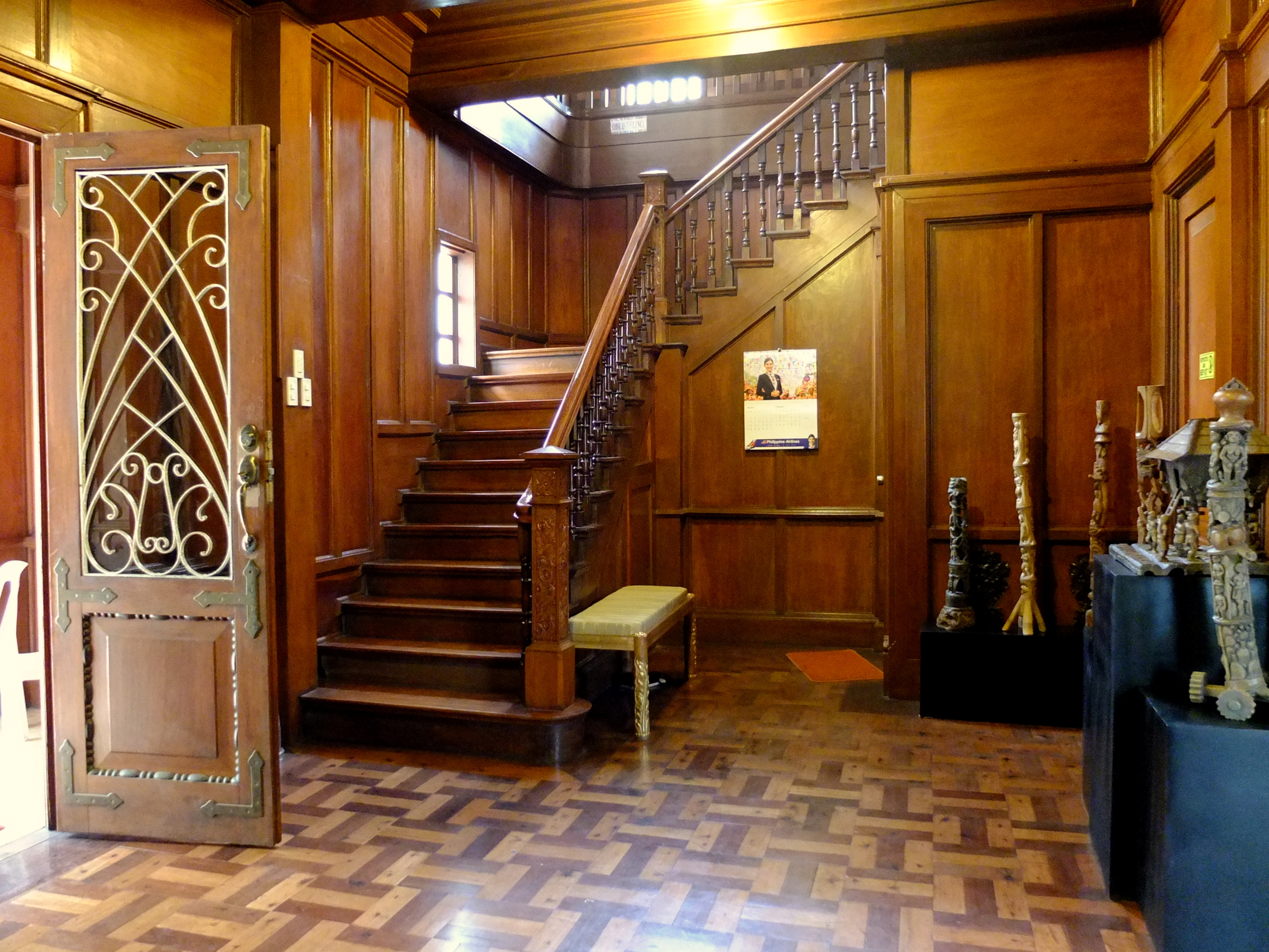
Foyer

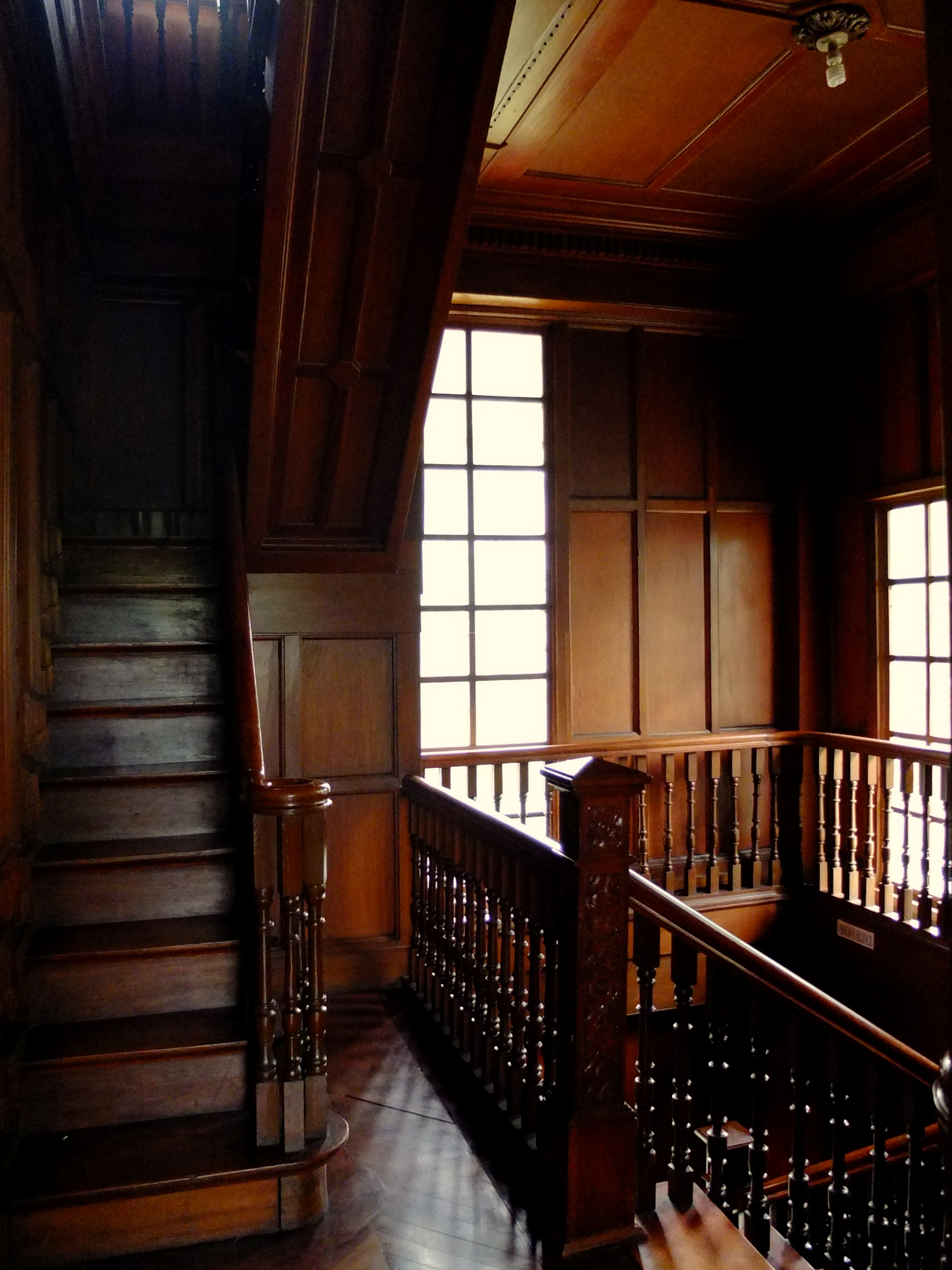
2nd-floor staircase

== See also ==
- List of reportedly haunted locations in the Philippines
- Diplomat Hotel
