= White House (film) =

- Directed by: Topel Lee
- Written by: Aloy Adlawan; Fairlane Raymundo; Enzo Valdez; Edson Rapisora
- Produced by: Lily Y. Monteverde
- Starring: Iza Calzado; Lovi Poe; Maricar Reyes; Gabby Concepcion
- Cinematography: Louie Quirino
- Edited by: Jay Halili
- Music by: Von de Guzman
- Production company: Regal Entertainment
- Release date: October 20, 2010
- Country: Philippines
- Languages: Filipino; English

White House is a 2010 Filipino supernatural horror film directed by Topel Lee and starring Iza Calzado, Lovi Poe, Maricar Reyes and Gabby Concepcion. It was distributed by Regal Entertainment. It features the famous Laperal White House in Baguio that was said to be haunted.

== Plot ==
A new horror reality show was set to be held at the haunted Laperal White House. Jet, a gifted and renowned spirit questor was hired by Coreen, the show's producer as a guide. But as the show begins, a dark secret within the house starts to unfold. The show's participants start to get haunted by a mysterious lady in black one by one.

== Cast ==
- Gabby Concepcion as Jet
- Iza Calzado as Stella/Black Lady/Ella
- Lovi Poe as April
- Maricar Reyes as Coreen
- Joem Bascon as Dom
- Janus Del Prado as Omar
- Megan Young as Mikey
- Mo Twister as Ken
- Jairus Aquino as LJ
- Sarah Lahbati as Pim
- Angel Jacob as Issa
- Richard Quan as Nix
- Emilio Garcia as Ron
- Lui Villaruz as Pierre
- Joey Paras as Jerry
- Laiza Comia as Shen
- Jappy Mercado as Stella's son/Andrew
- Chris Cayzer as Mikey's boyfriend
- Kat Armitage as Mikey's best friend
- John Lapid and Jeff Yadao as Jet's double
- Tata Gomera, Gina Requinto and Lumen Medrano as Stella's double
- Roman Bartolay as Omar's double
- Gilbert Tapel as Andrew's double
  - Ejay Falcon as Friend of Omar

== Production ==
The film was shot partially in Baguio in an allegedly haunted house.

== Release ==
The film premiered in Manila on October 19, 2010.

== Reception ==
"Regal Film's White House could have easily become the horror movie of the year. But it suffered for its screenplay's lack of depth, too many characters and storylines to focus on." commented a review on PEP. Spot made a more positive assessment, including the following check-list: "Ensemble cast of photogenic actors who can scream convincingly: check. Evil Presence embodied by a beautiful woman in a black shroud: check. Brave hero armed with holy candle and bottle of holy water (so handy in these situations): check. Ghosts of dead children: check. Slightly cheesy special effects: check. Screamers in the audience: watch out for them."

== See also ==
- List of ghost films
