= List of reportedly haunted locations in the Philippines =

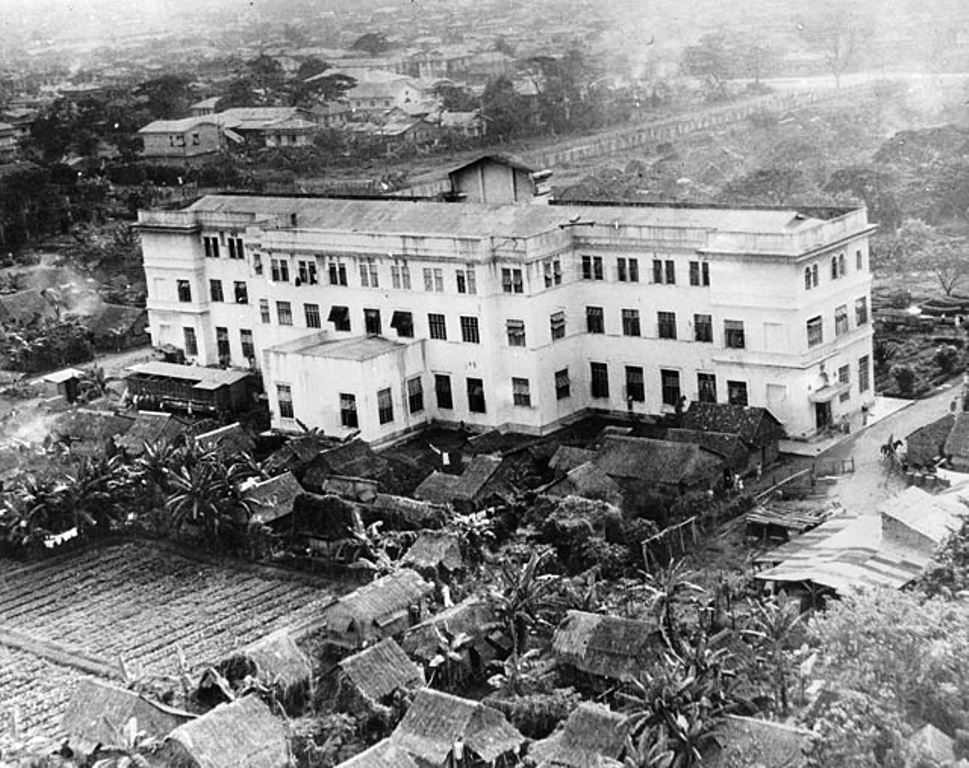
One of the principal buildings housing internees at the Santo Tomas Internment Camp was the Education building (now the UST Hospital). Shanties and vegetable gardens can be seen near the building and the wall of the university compound is in the background.

There are several reportedly haunted locations in the Philippines. Reports of such haunted locations are part of ghostlore, which is a form of folklore.

== Metro Manila ==
=== Caloocan ===
- Barugo Road, North Caloocan: Said to be haunted by a hairless, charred white lady who chases after passing jeepneys.

=== Las Piñas ===
- Concha Cruz Drive: Located inside BF Homes, the road was a frequent site of fatal accidents caused by drag racing in the 1980s. Stories abound of a phantom black sedan occupied by two bloodied passengers challenging motorists to race.
- Daang Hari: A major highway connecting Las Piñas, Muntinlupa and Cavite, the area is said to be haunted by the spirits of murder victims from the time that it was used as a dumping ground to dispose of bodies when it was unlit and mostly uninhabited.

=== Malabon ===
- Martinez House: Built during the American occupation, the house was originally a tobacco factory and later a maternity ward and infirmary prior to becoming a residence. Paranormal activity has been reported in what was formerly the delivery room for patients undergoing labor.

=== Mandaluyong ===
- La Salle Green Hills: One classroom is said to be haunted by a poltergeist.

=== Manila ===
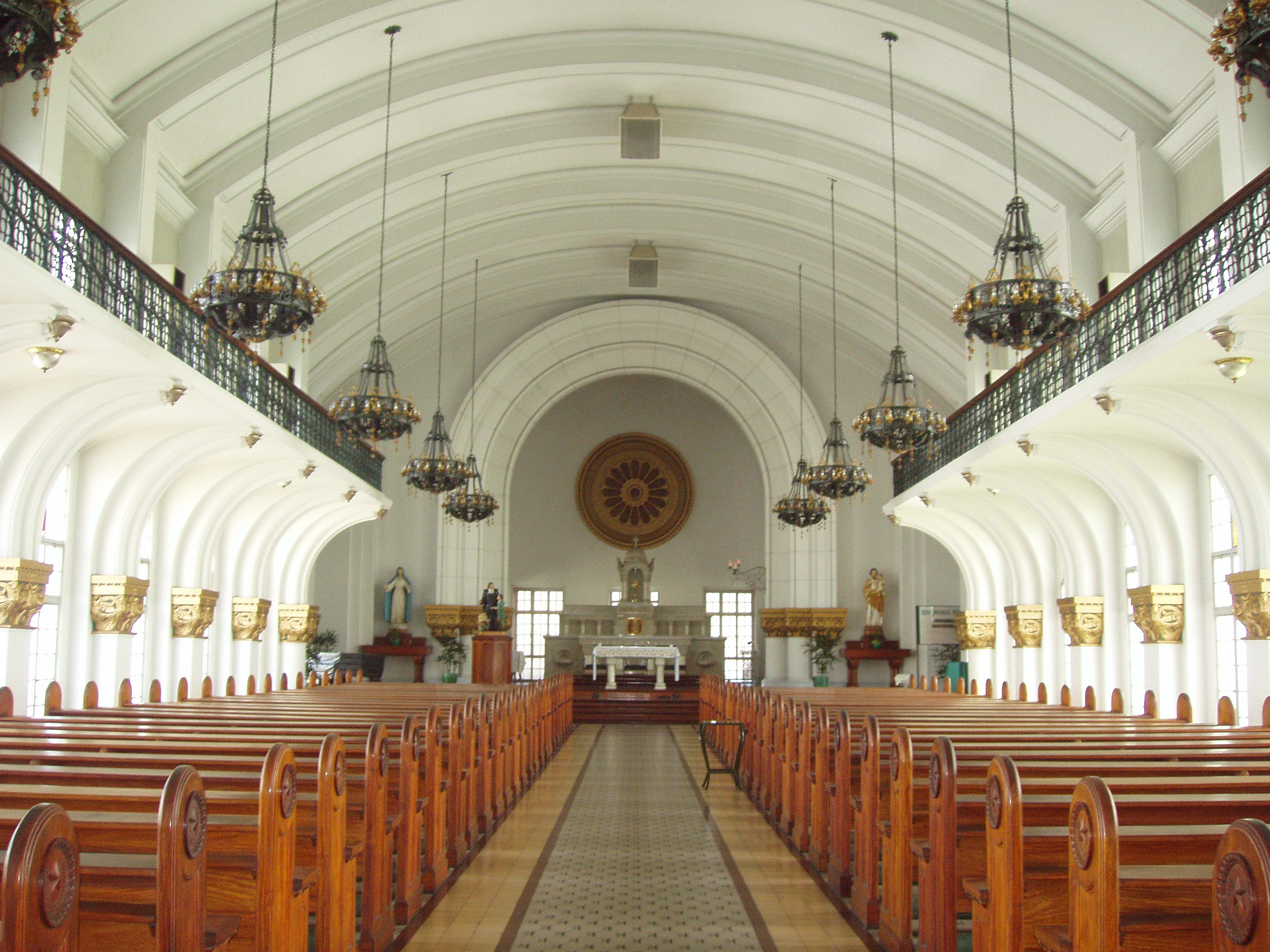
Chapel of the Most Blessed Sacrament of DLSU

- Barangay 629 Hall, Santa Mesa: Said to be haunted by poltergeists and the ghosts of children caroling.
- COMELEC Building, Arroceros: The city offices of the country's electoral commission (not to be confused with its national headquarters located in nearby Intramuros) are said by employees to be haunted, given the building's history as a former hospital.
- De La Salle University: Due to its brutal World War II-era history, DLSU is reportedly haunted. The university's Chapel of the Most Blessed Sacrament, which is housed inside St. La Salle Hall, witnessed the massacre of refugees and La Sallian brothers who sought shelter inside at the hands of the Imperial Japanese Army. The Bro. Connon Hall that houses the offices of the university's student organizations is reported by believing students to be haunted, by a female student who died after being trapped in the building's elevator. Other areas with reported paranormal activities are Brother Andrew Gonzalez Hall, Saint Mutien Marie Hall, and Saint Joseph Hall.
- Far Eastern University: The school's education building is said to be haunted by the spirit of a professor who died by suicide inside the campus.
- Intramuros: Several buildings within the city's old colonial quarter are believed to be haunted, mostly by the spirits of those killed during the Second World War. Some notable locations include Fort Santiago, Casa Manila, itself located in the reportedly haunted Plaza San Luis Complex, the ruins of the Aduana Building, the Baluarte de San Diego, and the Manila Cathedral.
- Luneta Hotel: During restoration works between 2008 and 2014, a blessing had to be performed on the hotel due to the presence of ghosts, particularly in its sixth floor.
- Malacañang Palace: The official residence and principal workplace of the President of the Philippines is considered by believers to be haunted by numerous ghosts such as those of former presidents Manuel L. Quezon, Manuel Roxas, and Ramon Magsaysay (who all died in office), former presidential aides and attendants, those from the pre-Hispanic era, people who were killed during the Second World War, and a black lady peering out towards the Pasig River from a window of the Mabini Hall late at night. Areas of reputed paranormal activities include the Mabini Hall, Heroes Hall, the Correspondence Office, the New Executive Building, and the Music Room. A large balete tree stands at the main entrance to the Freedom Park (at the grounds of the Malacañang fronting the Administration and Executive Buildings), which was designated as a National Heritage Tree in 2011 and claimed by believers to be the home of a kapre.

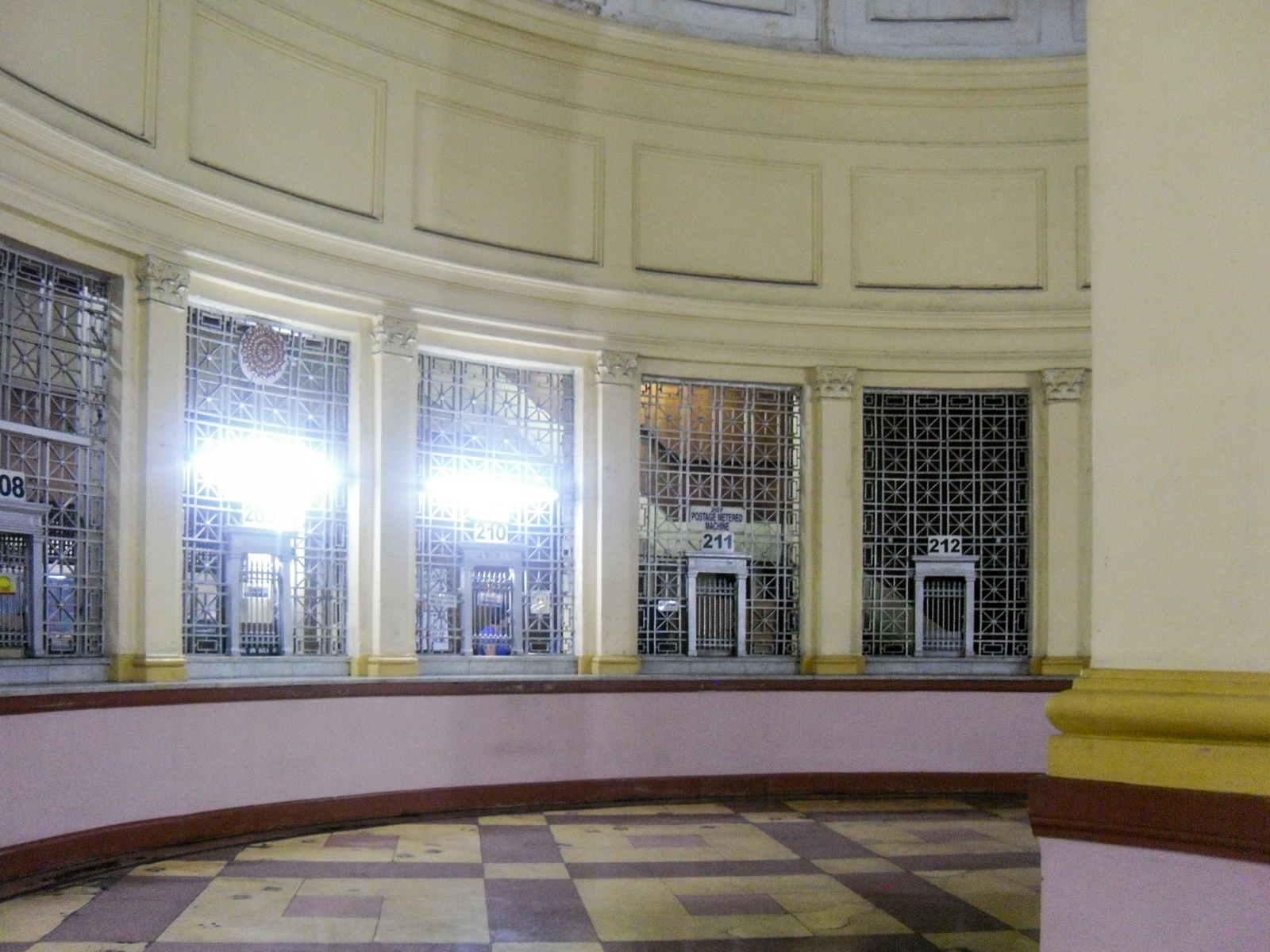
A section of the interior of Manila Central Post Office

- Manila Central Post Office: The building served as a crucial Japanese garrison during the Battle of Manila in 1945. Believing employees, past and present, claim of various residual hauntings from the war in the building. It was featured in the 2021 Halloween special of GMA Network's telemagazine program Kapuso Mo, Jessica Soho.

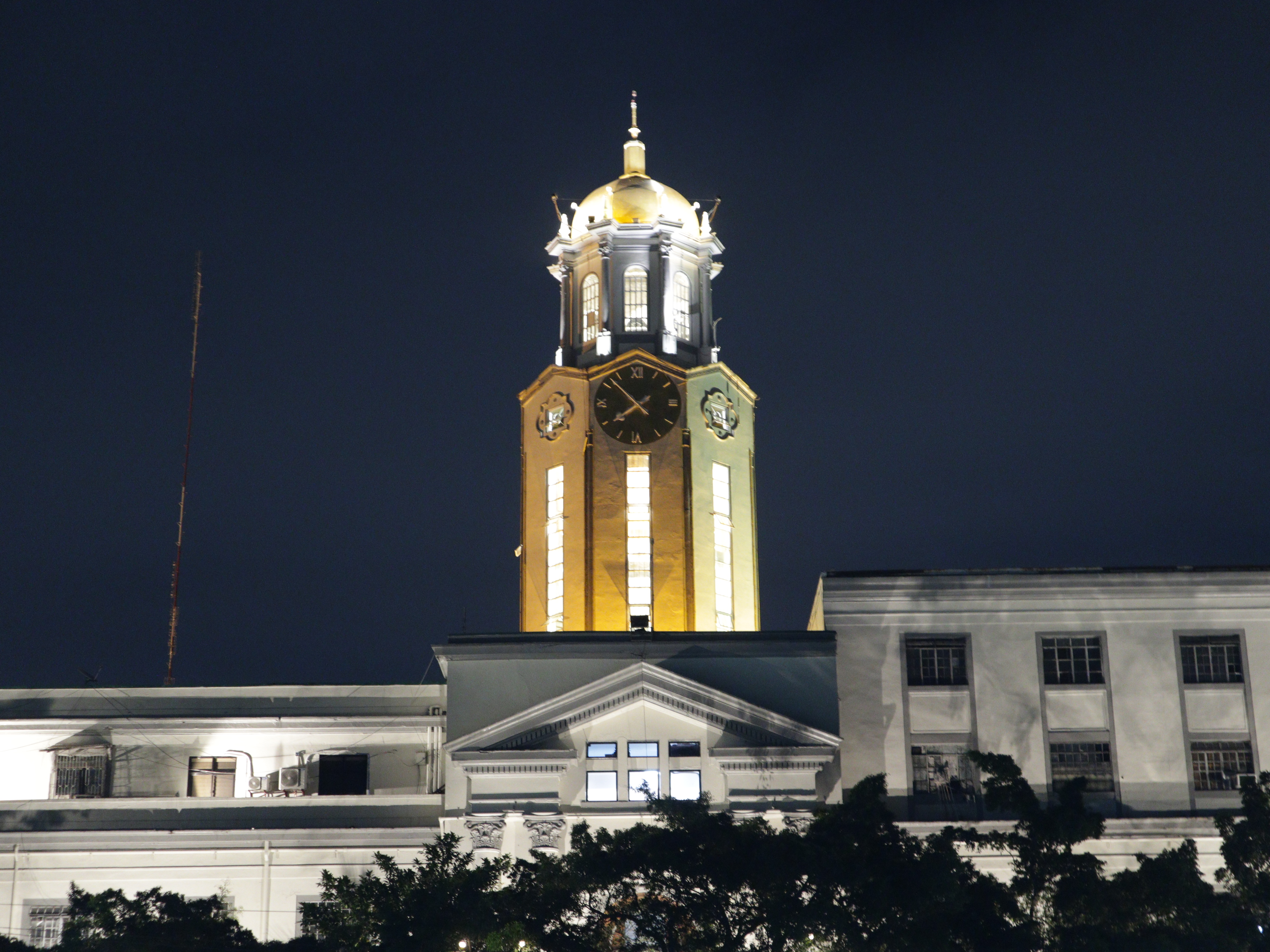
Manila City Hall at night

- Manila City Hall: Believing city hall employees claim of wandering specters after 6:00 p.m.. Paranormal experts who investigated in the area confirmed poltergeist activities, residual hauntings from Japanese-era ghosts and a woman believed to have died in the premises during World War II. Most of the hauntings are concentrated in the clock tower of the building. Believers also note its eerie casket-like shape when viewed from above (although some contend it resembles the shield of the Knights Templar).
- Manila Hotel: Said to be haunted by the ghost of a suicide victim who fell off the 15th floor, in addition to lights and air-conditioning operating on their own.
- Manila Metropolitan Theater: Said to be haunted by a “lady in black”, believed to be the spirit of an actress who died in a car accident in 1992, along with other ghosts. During restoration works, sounds of phantom performances in the theater stage were reported by workers, an occurrence that has happened even during the time when some areas of the theater were leased commercially.
- Manila North Cemetery: Said by residents and gravekeepers to be haunted by the spirits of those interred there.
- Paco Park: A former cemetery, most hauntings are said to occur in the vicinity of the women's restroom.
- Ramona Apartments, Ermita: Prior to its demolition, the building, which was built in 1949, was said to have been haunted by the spirit of its original owner, Ramona Gonzalez.
- University of the Philippines Manila: Said to be haunted by multiple spirits, including that of a janitor who committed suicide in the Andres Bonifacio Building. Ghost sightings have also been reported at the adjacent Philippine General Hospital.
- University of Santo Tomas: Is reported by believers to be haunted, due to its long history that spans from the Spanish era. UST also served as an internment camp during the Second World War wherein many of the prisoners of war were "enemy aliens", mostly Americans, living in the Philippines. Many prisoners died of starvation, illness, and other causes. The university is also a witness to unlucky students resorting to suicide, such as the female ghost in one of the ladies' restrooms in the Main Building. Other reportedly haunted locations in the campus include Benavidez park and the Ossuarium in the medical building.

=== Marikina ===
- Metropolitan Manila Development Authority Tumana Impounding Area: Believing security guards claim of ghosts haunting the impounded vehicles that were involved in road accidents.

=== Muntinlupa ===
Starmall Alabang

- Starmall Alabang: It is situated on the former site of the Alabang Cemetery. Believers claim that ghosts haunt its theaters. Burnt down in a fire in 2022, and has been rebuilt as The Terminal, now managed by Vista Malls, the modern identity of Starmalls.

=== Pasay ===
- EDSA-Roxas Boulevard Flyover: The ghost of a man who appears to suddenly cross the road has been blamed on several vehicular accidents on the bridge as affected drivers claim that they were trying to avoid hitting it.

Manila Film Center

- Manila Film Center: A major component of the Cultural Center of the Philippines, the facility was the site of a construction accident. Construction was rushed as the first Manila Film Festival neared, and on November 17, 1981, the scaffolding holding the fourth floor gave way, sending workers down to be entombed in the quick-drying cement. Project supervisor Betty Benitez ordered the work to continue, instead of retrieving the bodies of the dead workers, for fear of not meeting the deadline. Paranormal activities began on the day the construction resumed, with the deceased workers appearing themselves to their living colleagues. Usherettes who were invited on January 18, 1982, the day of the film festival, claimed to have felt cold presences and smelled mysterious odor in the backstage. Benitez herself died in a car accident months after the events. Believers claim the spirits of the dead workers continue to indicate their presence in the theater. The facility, formerly abandoned due to its reputation, is currently occupied by the Amazing Philippine Theatre Company.
- Philippine National Bank: The fifth floor of this building at Roxas Boulevard was used as a morgue for the multiple victims of a fire at the Regent of Manila hotel on February 13, 1985. Exorcisms were conducted on the said floor at the requests of previous occupants because of frequent paranormal activities. It is currently a storage area for the bank.

=== Quezon City ===
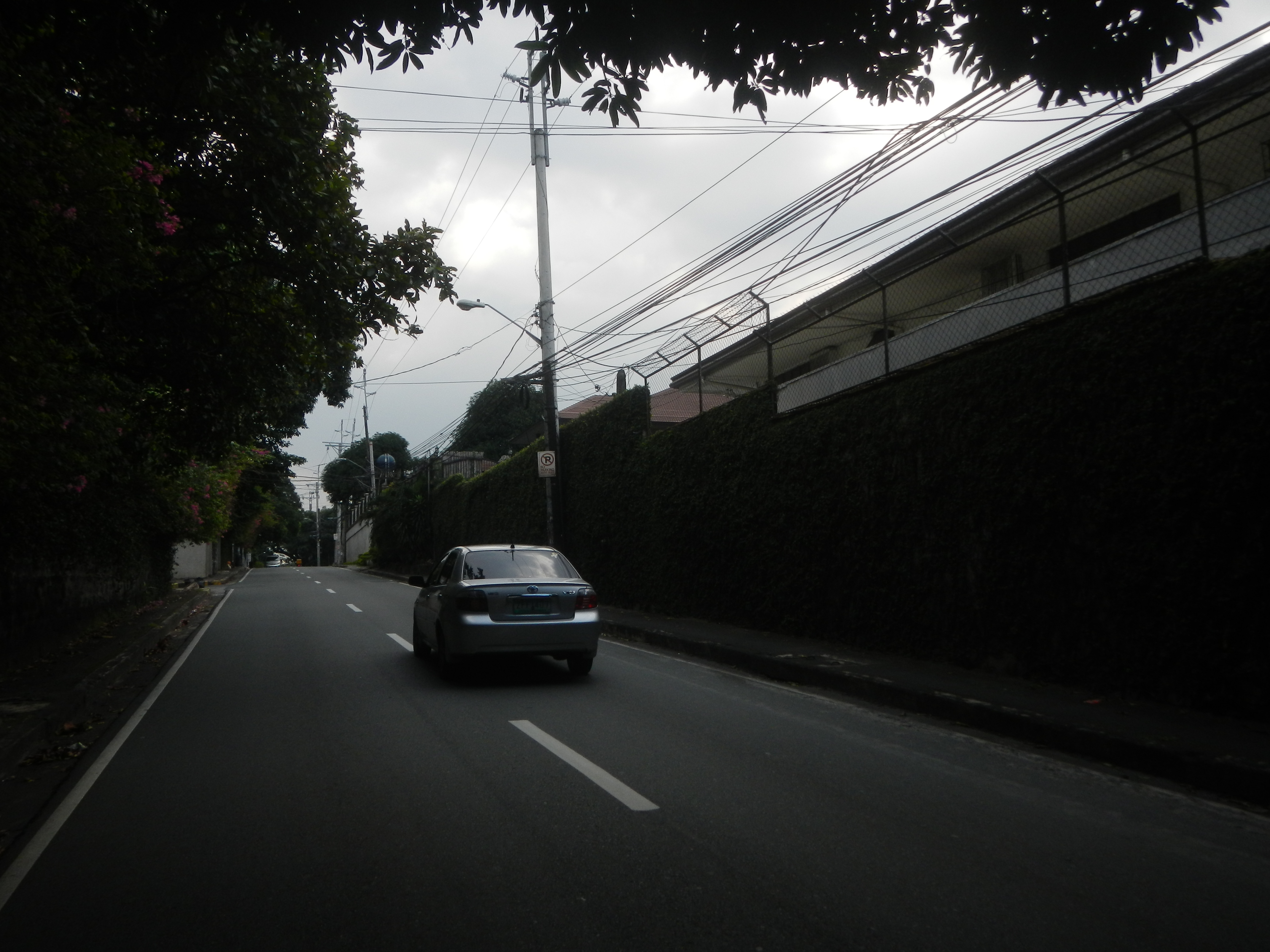
Balete Drive

- Ateneo de Manila University: One of the most prestigious educational institutions of the country, ADMU is claimed by believers to be haunted by multiple spirits, including that of a janitor who was said to have suffocated to death after being accidentally locked inside the Philippine Institute of Pure and Applied Chemistry (PIPAC) building after working hours, during which all exits were sealed tight to preserve the chemicals stored within the facility.
- Balete Drive: A major residential avenue in the eastern part of New Manila, Balete Drive is noted as the site of several apparitions of a white lady, who is considered by believers to be the ghost of a teenage girl who was raped and killed by a taxi driver in the 1950s. Another account mentions the spirit as that of a 19-year-old granddaughter of Senator Claro M. Recto who died in a road accident while on a joyride with friends in 1949.
- Broadway Avenue: Dubbed as "Millionaire's Row" for its being located in the affluent neighborhood of New Manila, several mansions along the road are said to be haunted by various entities. One of the houses in question, Villa Caridad, was used as the setting for several horror films such as Fe, Esperanza, Caridad (1974), Halimaw (1986), and Hiwaga sa Balete Drive (1988), about the white lady residing on the aforementioned street in the same neighborhood.
- Capitol Medical Center: A certain elevator of the hospital is said to be haunted. Eyewitnesses claim this off-limits elevator brought them to the basement, which once served as a morgue, instead of bringing them to their intended destination.
- Miriam College: Believing students claim that the ghost of a nun resides in the ladies' restroom at the 2nd floor of the Caritas Building.

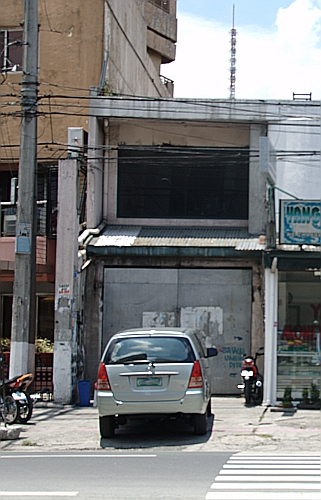
Ozone discothèque as it appeared in 2008.

- Mother Ignacia Avenue: Said to be haunted by the ghost of a young woman who appears at noon.
- Office of the Ombudsman Building: The institution's former office in Arroceros, Manila, was said to have been haunted by the ghost of an elderly vendor who died in an elevator accident as well as white ladies. Its current premises in Diliman, Quezon City is also said to be haunted by ghosts of crying babies and women, believed to be the spirits of aborted fetuses dumped in the area when it was an empty lot.
- Ozone Disco: A former discothèque that was the site of the worst fire in Philippine history, which killed at least 162 people and injured at least 95 in 1996. Phantom music and shadows of dancing figures were reported from its ruins, and hauntings allegedly spread to the nearby Imperial Hotel as well. The discothèque building was demolished in 2015, and the site is now presently occupied by GoodAh!!!, a 24-hour diner, co-owned by Boy Abunda. Abunda communicated with the spirits prior to the business' opening, and paranormal activities in the area were claimed to have greatly minimized ever since.
- Saint Pedro Poveda College: Said to be haunted by the ghost of a suicide victim who died in the garden behind the school chapel.
- Sandiganbayan Centennial Building: The headquarters of the country's anti-graft court is said to be haunted by several poltergeists and ghosts including those from the Spanish era and the court's former Presiding Justice Francis Garchitorena. It is also said that the land on which the court was built was formerly a dumping ground for victims of summary executions.
- University of the Philippines Diliman: Its long history is said to be the reason of its alleged hauntings. Guerrero Theater, housed in the second floor of Palma Hall, supposedly hosts the spirit of a young theater actress who committed suicide after a newcomer obscured her recognition. Other areas of reported paranormal activity include the College of Music, the Vanguard Building, the College of Education, Vinzons Hall. and the University Hotel. Jeepney drivers plying routes inside the campus have also reported vanishing hitchhikers.
- Velez residence: Following the 1948 murder of actress Lilian Velez and a housemaid by her leading man Narding Anzures, neighbors claimed to have heard singing voices from the subsequently abandoned house, located in Pulag Street (now Nicanor Jimenez Street), Barangay Santa Mesa Heights, until it was demolished to make way for a Buddhist temple.

=== Taguig ===
- Fort Bonifacio: Philippine Army personnel stationed at the complex have reported ghosts of soldiers, particularly at the Libingan ng mga Bayani and the Manila American Cemetery.
- Fort Bonifacio Tenement: Built in 1963, it contains more than 700 units, one of which is Unit 771. Its current occupant, residing since 1989, claims it is haunted by the ghost of a wailing woman seeking for help. It was featured in the 2022 Halloween special of GMA Network's telemagazine program Kapuso Mo, Jessica Soho.

== Independent cities ==
=== Angeles ===
- Pamintuan Mansion: The 1890s residence is said to be haunted by the spirit of a young woman who resides in its rooftop tower.

=== Bacolod ===
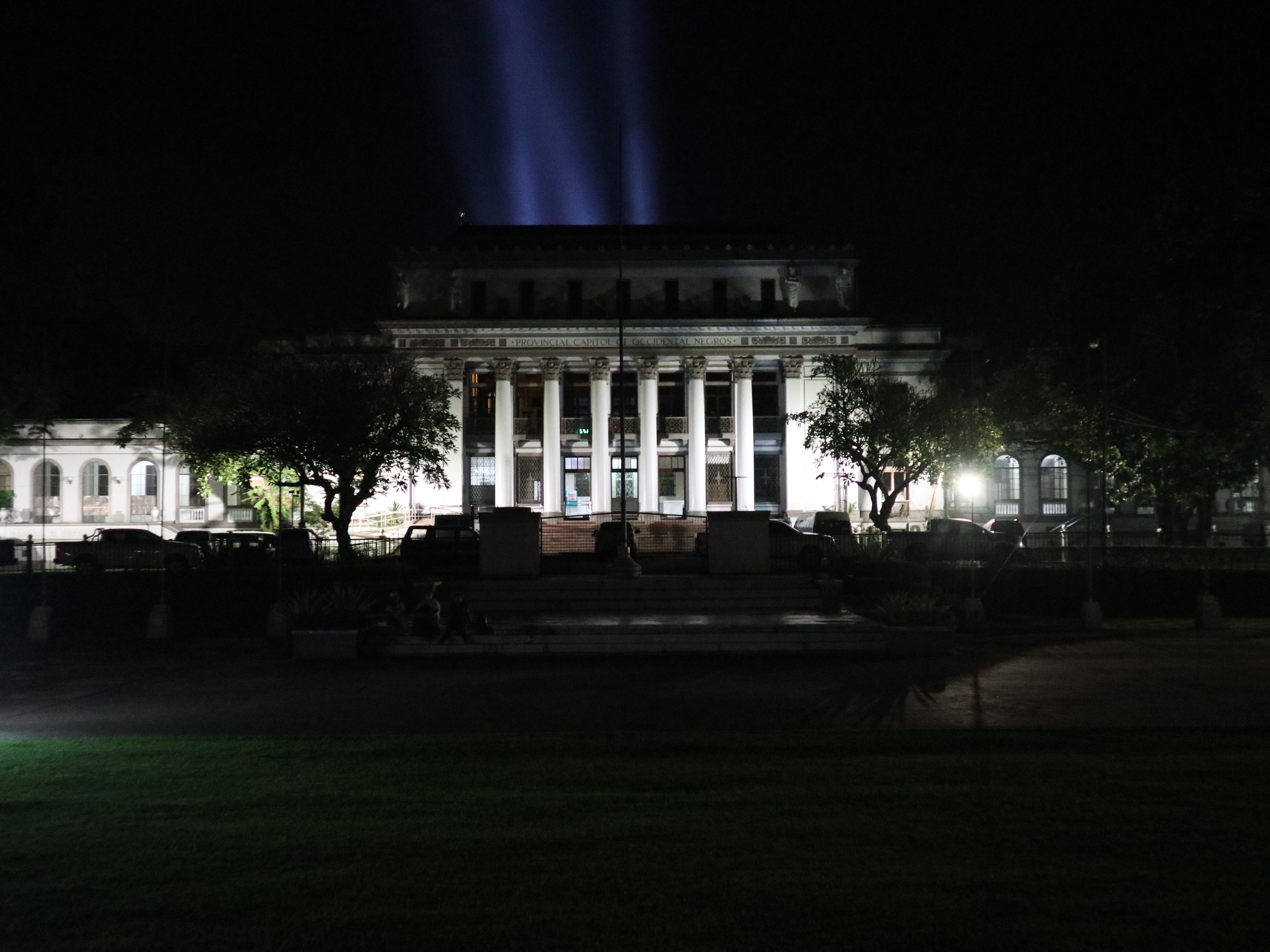
Negros Occidental Capitol at night in 2022

- Negros Occidental Provincial Capitol: Completed in 1933, it served as the administration office of the Imperial Japanese army from 1942 to 1944, with its basement used as a prison. Believing security guards claim of World War II specters and a kapre.
- University of St. La Salle: The campus is said to be haunted by ghosts, poltergeists and doppelgangers.

=== Baguio ===
The largest city of northern Luzon, the noted tourist destination is said to be highly haunted. There are several haunted locations scattered throughout the city, such as cemeteries, old hotels, and other sites where structures used to stand until the 1990 Luzon earthquake destroyed them, injuring and killing the people inside. The city was also the site of some of the most brutal atrocities committed during the Battle of Baguio. Such haunted locations include the following:

- Camp John Hay: Ghosts have been reported at the Murder Woods area of the facility, so called because it was used as an execution site during the American and Japanese occupations.
- Casa Vallejo: The oldest hotel in the city, it was built in 1909 to house key personnel of the Bureau of Public Works before becoming a hotel in 1923. It is alleged that it served as a detention center for German prisoners of war in 1917. Unexplained noises have been reported by guests.
- Dominican Hill Retreat House: Commonly called the Diplomat Hotel, it was originally a seminary and later converted into a hotel. Situated atop the Dominican Hill, it has been claimed to be haunted because of atrocities committed there by the Japanese forces during World War II.
- Hotel Nevada: One of several buildings destroyed in the 1990 Luzon earthquake.
- Hyatt Terraces Hotel: A 12-story hotel that was destroyed in the 1990 Luzon earthquake. Its collapse killed at least 50 people. Believers claim ghosts of those who died in the earthquake wandering the vacant site.
- Japanese Tunnels: A labyrinth of underground tunnels that were built by the Imperial Japanese Army and claimed to be haunted.
- Laperal White House: Also known as the Laperal Guesthouse, it was built by Roberto Laperal in the 1920s as a vacation home for his family. According to legend, the house is haunted by members of the Laperal family and victims of Japanese soldiers who occupied the house during World War II. In 2007, it was purchased by Filipino-Chinese business magnate Lucio Tan, and it became a museum showcasing locally made Filipino artworks based on bamboo and wood. Since 2022, it houses an upscale restaurant called "Joseph's Baguio," which specializes in French cuisine. The building's haunted reputation is now promoted as part of the restaurant's attraction.
- Loakan Airport: Believing nocturnal guards claim seeing the specter of a child on a bicycle who entered the runway and was killed by an approaching aircraft.
- Loakan Road: The access road to Loakan Airport, believers claim of a female vanishing hitchhiker (supposedly a rape victim) wandering it. A tree that formerly stood in the middle segment of the road was the reputed home of the specter, and believers claim the DPWH employee who cut it down was later killed by a falling tree.
- Mount Mary Hill: A phantom procession of spirits of clergy members holding candles is said to occur around the grotto of the Assumption Sisters’ old convent at night.
- Philippine Military Academy: The military school of the Armed Forces of the Philippines (AFP) is reportedly haunted by various ghosts, including a faceless cadet not in proper attire roaming around the institution at night.
- Saint Louis University Gymnasium: The site of the building was said to have been used as an execution site by the Japanese during World War II, and is said to be haunted by the spirits of victims from that time.
- Teacher's Camp: First established as a training site by American teachers (Thomasites), it is now a training center for teachers in the country. It is alleged that it was built on the site of a battlefield of the former indigenous residents. Apparitions reported include a crying lady and a headless priest.
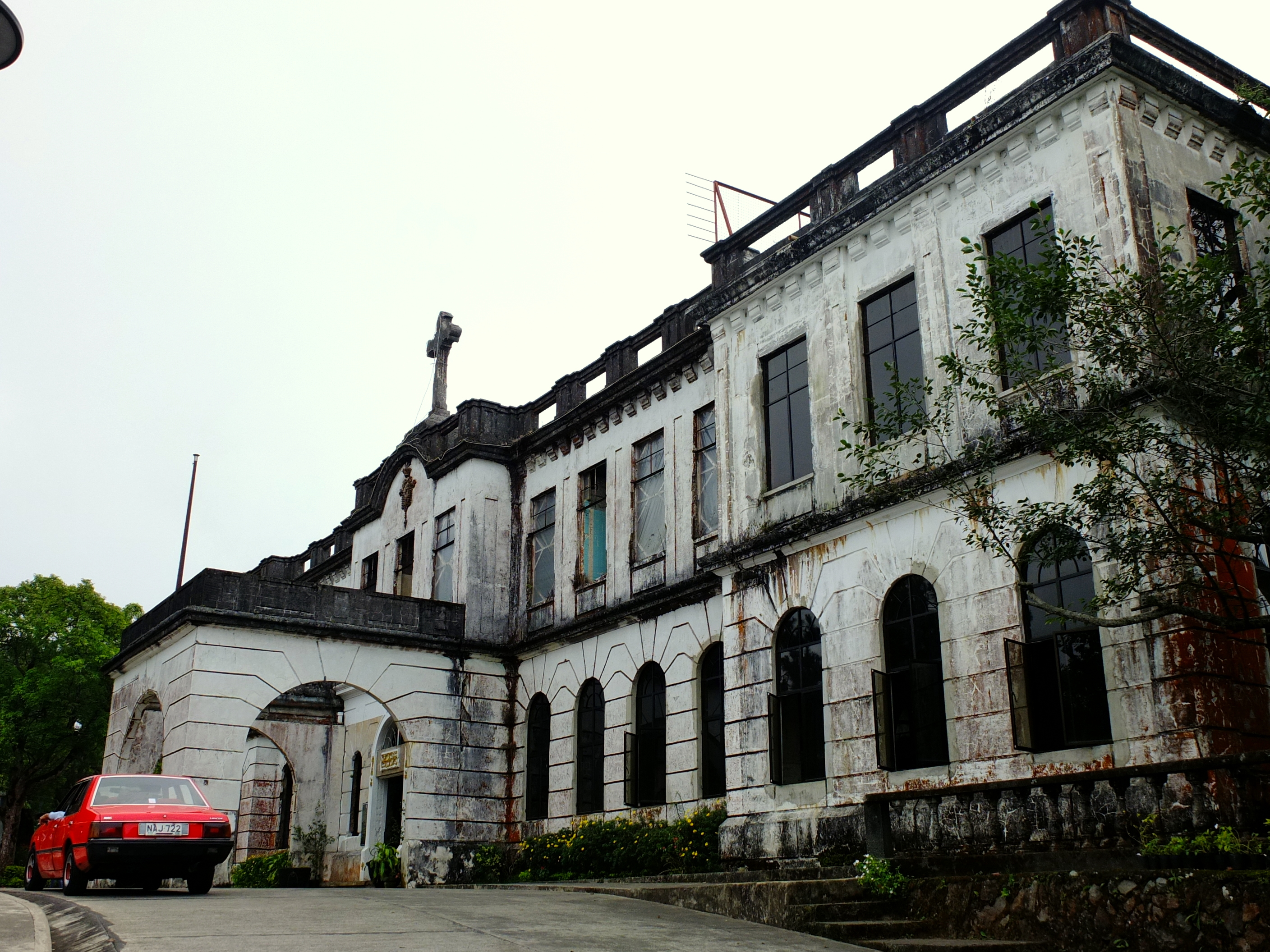
Dominican Hill Retreat House

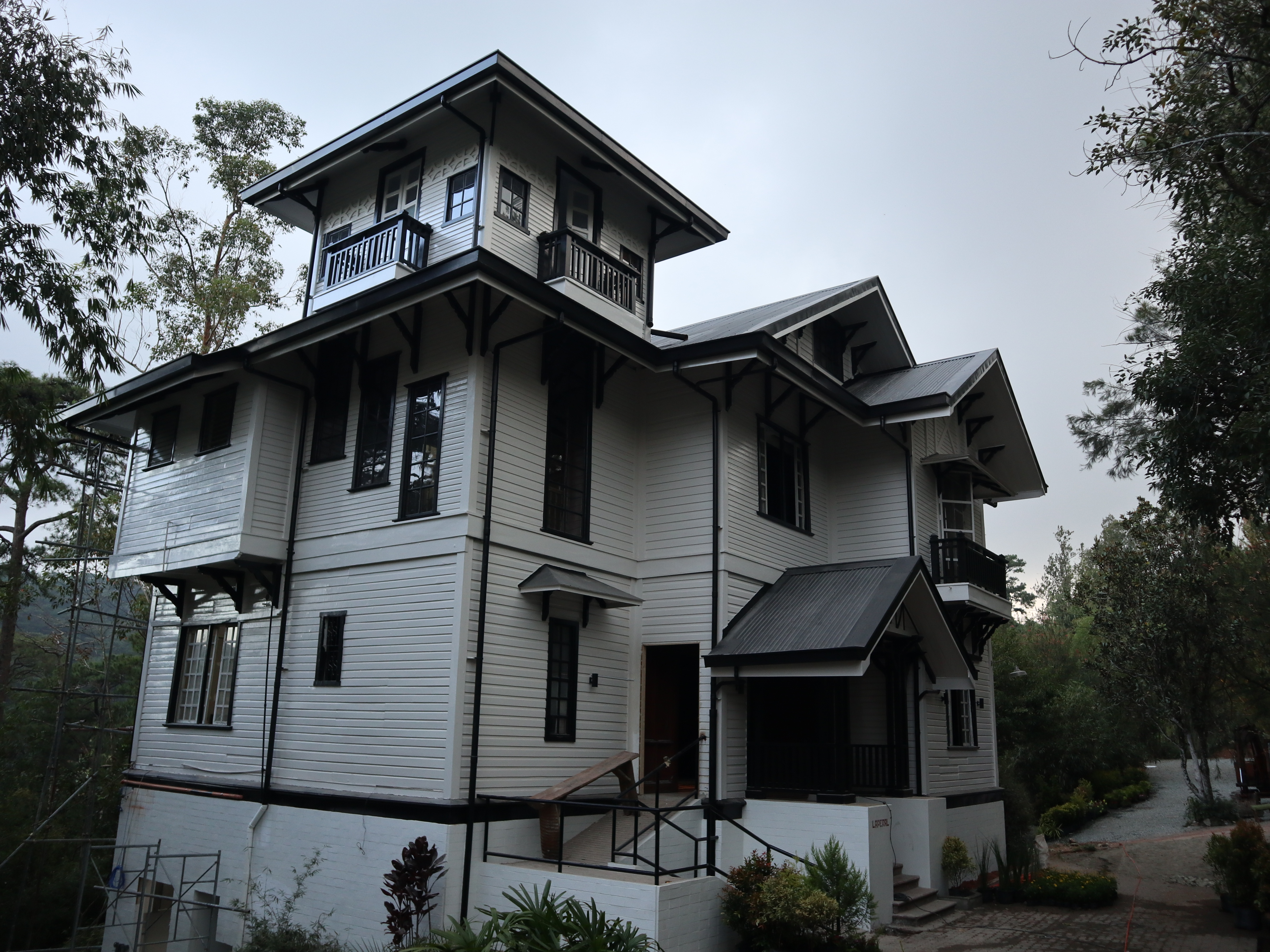
Laperal House

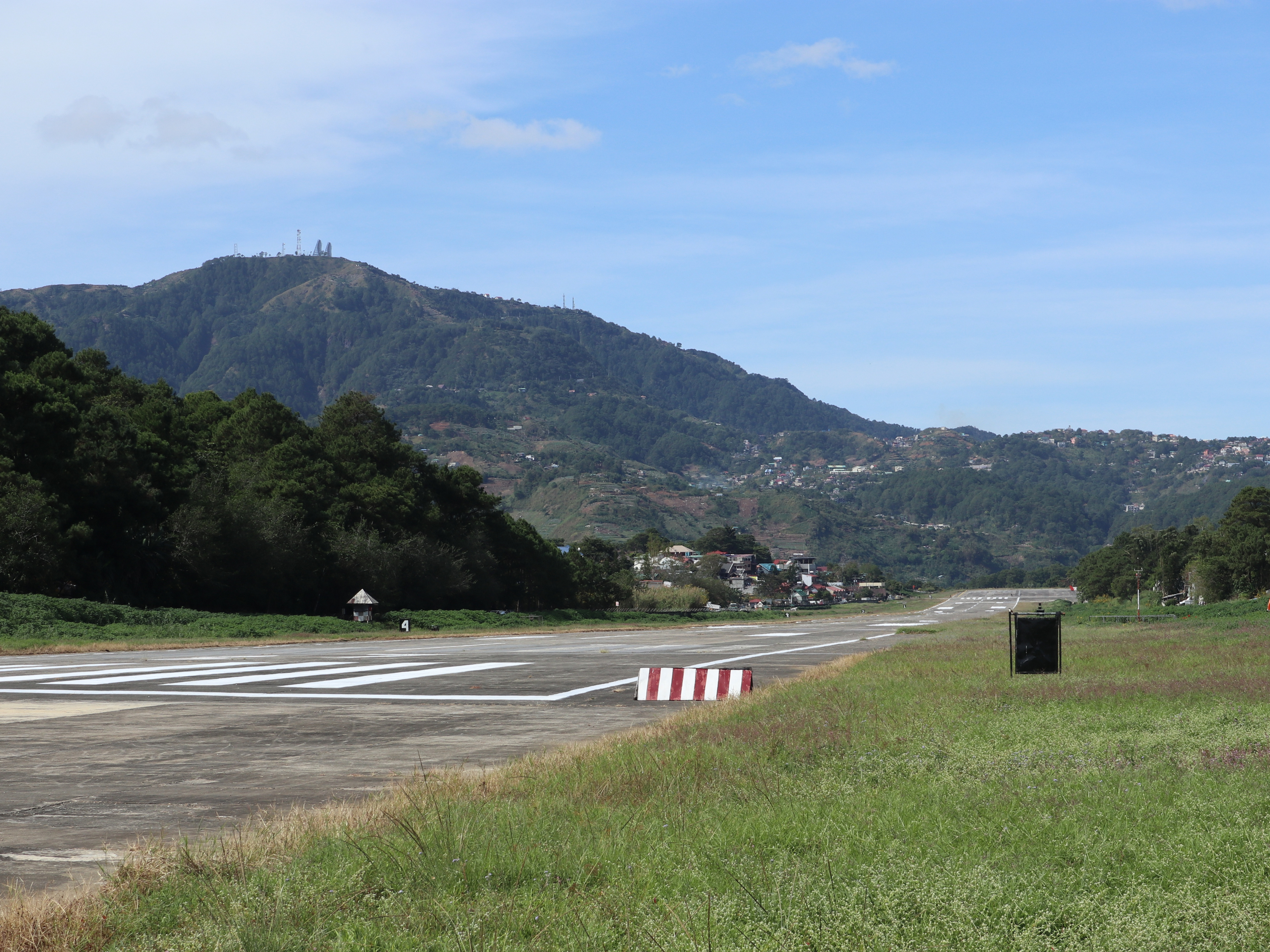
Loakan Airport

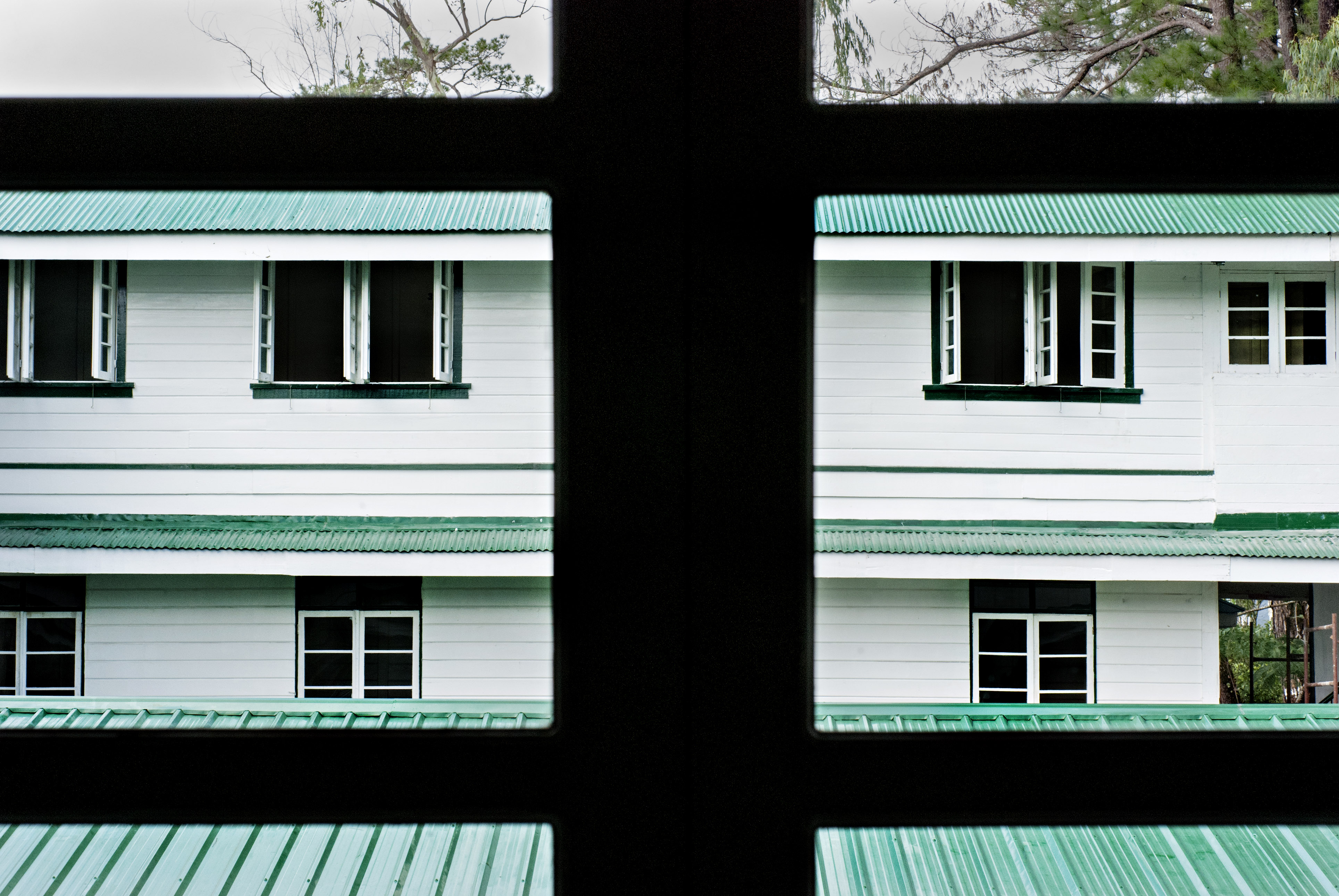
Teacher's Camp

=== Cagayan de Oro ===
- City Memorial Park, Bolonsori, Barangay Camama-an: The cemetery has hosted at least 50,000 burials and is said by nearby residents to haunted by spirits, including that of victims of Tropical Storm Sendong in 2011.
- Gusa: A section of highway in the said barangay is said to be haunted by the spirits of victims of vehicular accidents.
- Old Hall of Justice building, Hayes Street: Built on the site of the city's previous public cemetery and has been reportedly haunted ever since. Operations at the building were moved to another location following a 2015 fire that killed two people.

=== Cebu City ===
- Camp Sotero Cabahug: The headquarters of the Cebu City Police Office is said to be haunted by multiple ghosts and poltergeists.
- Casa Gorordo Museum: Believed to be haunted by the sister of Bishop Juan Gorordo.
- Cebu Normal University: Believed to be haunted by spirits from the time the campus was used as a detention center by the Kempeitai during World War II. Accordingly, restrictions are placed on holding classes at certain times while night classes are held in newer buildings.
- Compañia Maritima: The ruins of this building, which was built in 1910 and abandoned since its owners filed for bankruptcy in the 1980s, are said to be haunted by entities, with sounds being heard from within its premises at night.
- Fort San Pedro.
- Jesuit House, Parian: The spirits of seven Jesuits killed during the Spanish era are said to haunt the residence.
- Museo Sugbo: A former prison said to be haunted by ghosts in Japanese clothing walking into walls.
- Kalunasan: An inland barangay of the city, residents claim of hearing a ship's siren that is regarded as an omen of impending death.
- Perpetual Succour Hospital: Believed to be haunted by the spirits of nuns from the Sisters of Saint Paul of Chartres whose presence in patient rooms is said to foretell the occupant's impending death.
- Saint Joseph the Patriarch Parish Church, Mabolo: Believed to be haunted by a dark-hooded figure, while poltergeists are said to slam its pews against each other.
- Saint Mary's Dormitory, F. Ramos Street: Believed to be haunted by spirits and doppelgangers.
- South Road Properties Tunnel: Believed to be haunted by the ghost of a child. Human remains were also found during its construction, which were believed to have come from World War II.
- Unidentified building along Escario Street: Located in front of Cebu Pensione Plaza, which is also believed to be haunted, the structure saw a worker die or figure in an accident every month during its construction. Following its completion, neighboring residents reported sounds of construction work from the building.
- University of San Carlos-South Campus: Believed to be haunted by the spirit of a student named Minda Mora, who was said to have died in disputed circumstances and was buried inside the campus' cultural center, where reported sightings of her occur. It is said that those who mock nervous or poorly-performing actors in the theater die shortly afterwards.
- University of the Philippines Cebu: Believed to be haunted by spirits from the time when it was served as a Japanese stockade in World War II. Noises of metal chains are also reportedly heard.
- Villalon Mansion, Capitol Site: Once the residence of an affluent Cebuano family, believers claim of a white lady haunting the now-off limits property.
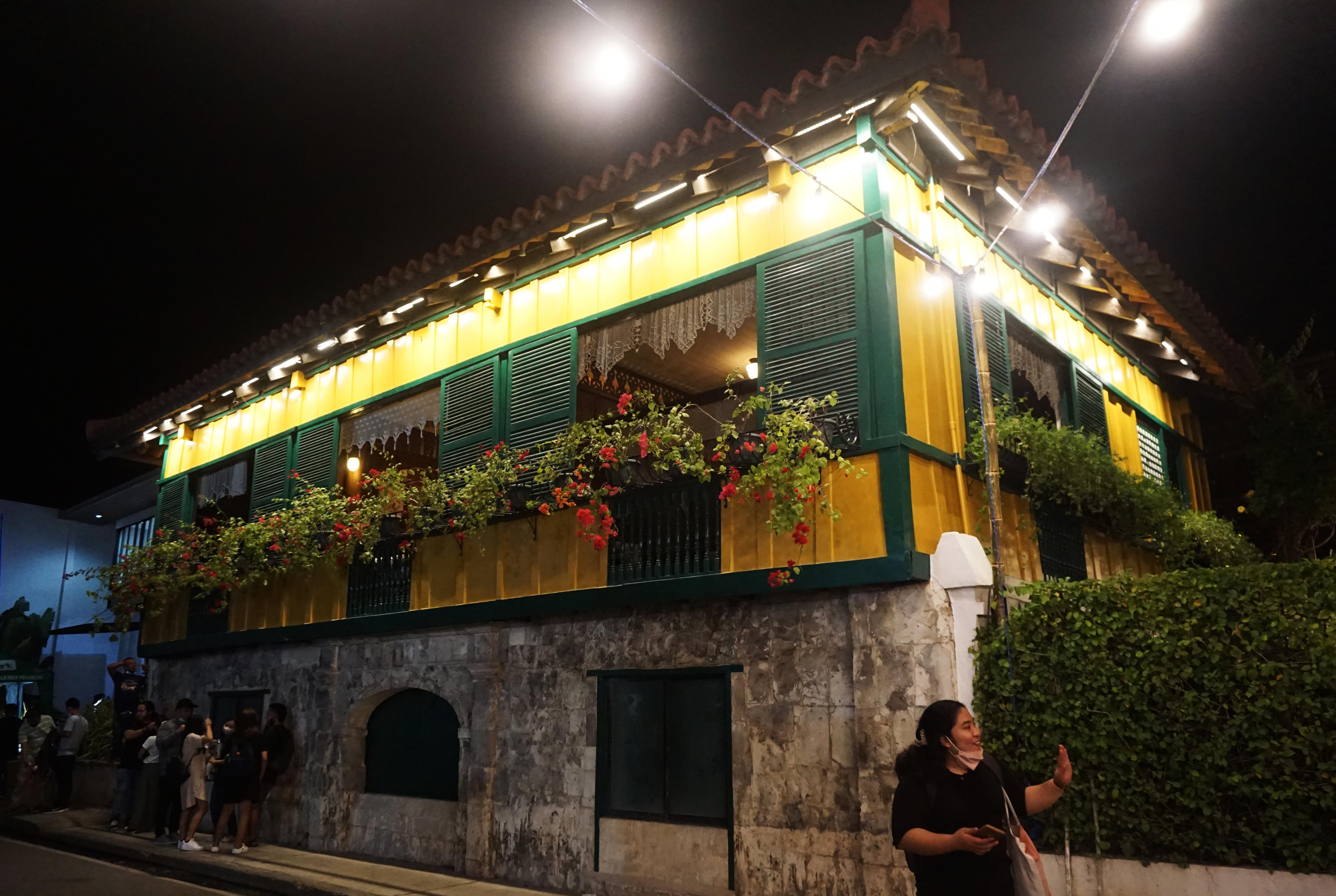
Casa Gorordo Museum

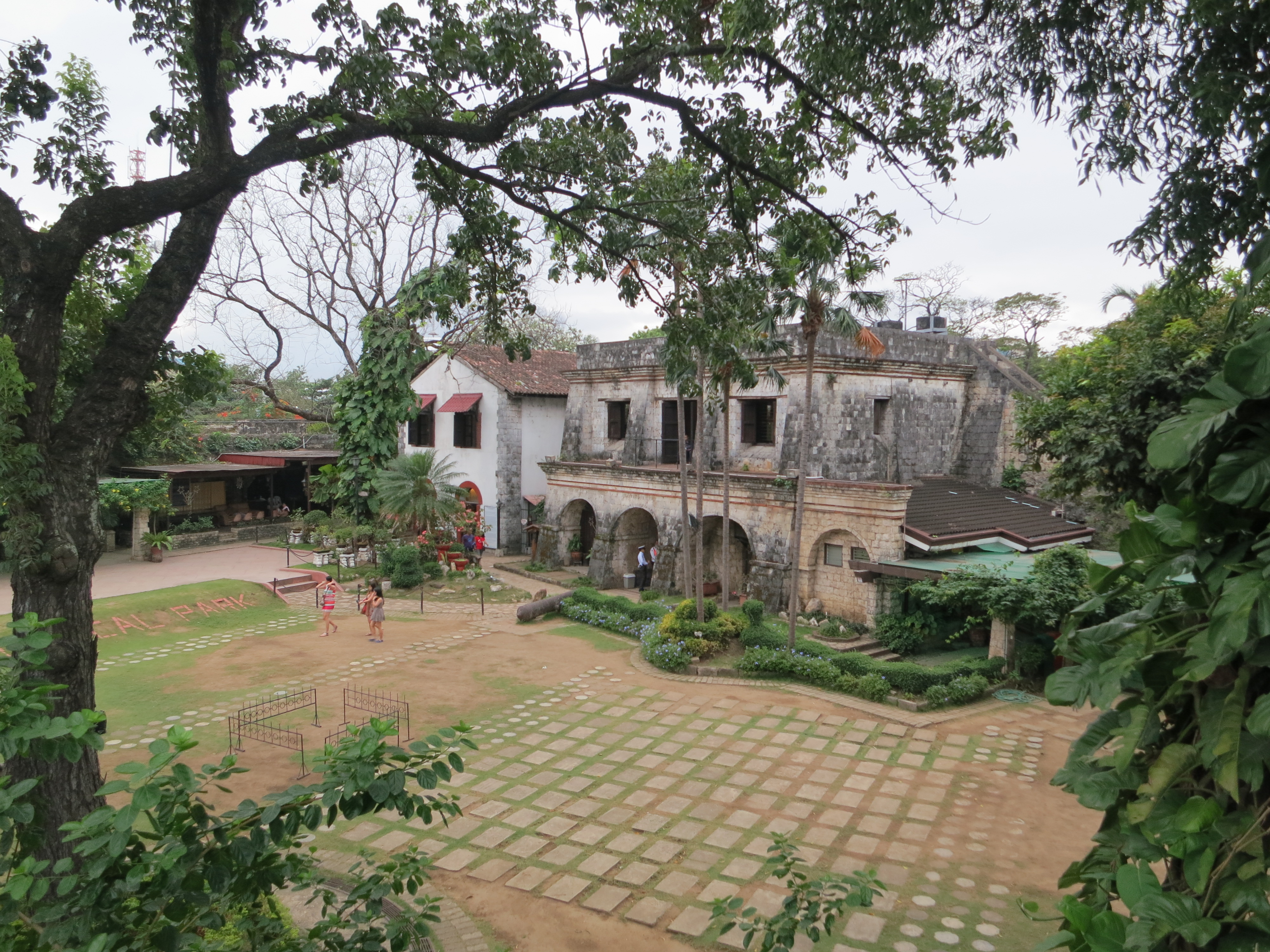
Fort San Pedro interior

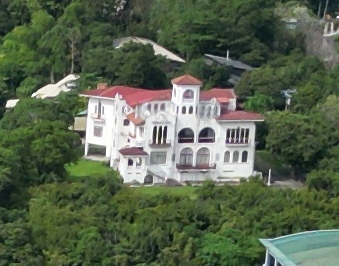
Villalon Mansion

=== Dagupan ===
- Chinese Cemetery: Said to be haunted by several ghosts. Its gates are also said to open on its own at midnight.

=== Davao City ===
Francisco Bangoy International Airport's former terminal buildings, which still stand today.

- Ahas Street: Located inside Juna Subdivision, it is said to be haunted by the spirits of those killed during political violence in the 1980s, when the area became a dumping ground for victims of summary executions.
- Ateneo de Davao University – Matina campus: The campus is situated on site of a wartime-era Japanese airfield. Believing students, faculty, staff, and security personnel claim of ghosts of Japanese soldiers and of deceased students haunting the campus.
- Department of the Interior and Local Government (DILG) Regional office: Believers claim this location is haunted by a kapre, with the area having previously been filled with balete trees.
- Durian Hotel: Since being abandoned after closing down in 2001, the hotel's elevator, which is visible outside, has been said to function on its own on certain instances.
- Francisco Bangoy International Airport: The former terminals of Davao City's main airport in Sasa district is now the home of several homeless families. Those believing occupants claim it is haunted by the deceased victims of the March 2003 bombing that killed 21 people.
- Mount Apo: The highest peak in the country is said to be inhabited by supernatural beings, including a white deer that is said to assist lost hikers.
- Palm Drive: A short road in Buhangin district whose south end is to the west of the SSS Bajada branch and Southern Philippines Medical Center. Believers claim it is haunted by a brown lady said to be a housemaid of one of the residences along the street who was murdered during a robbery attempt.
- Si residence: The old residence of the Si family at Champaca Street is claimed by believers to be haunted by its members who were massacred according to legend. Contrary to this, however, the family moved to Manila in the mid-1990s.
- Talomo Beach: A row of retreat houses along the said beach are said by believers to be haunted by children who drowned along the shores of the beach.

=== Iloilo City ===
Roblee Science Hall of Central Philippine University

- Casa Mariquit, Jaro: The residence of former Vice President Fernando Lopez, its second floor is said to be haunted by ghosts. It is said that one visitor who slept in the house turned up in a wooden bench in unexplained circumstances.
- Central Philippine University, Jaro: Said by believers to be haunted by victims of Japanese atrocities in the place during World War II. Many Americans who founded the university were killed by the Japanese troops. Among ghosts reported include a white lady, an enchained girl, a hairy imp, doppelgangers, and the university's founder William Valentine, who is rumored to appear as a headless figure carrying his head, although in reality, he died of malaria before the war. An urban legend also states that the university's Roblee Science Hall sometimes disappears from view at 03:00 in the morning. Other reportedly haunted buildings in the campus include the CPU Field, the High School Compound, Franklin Hall, Johnson Hall, Weston Hall, and Valentine Hall.
- National Museum Western Visayas, City Proper: Formerly the Iloilo Rehabilitation Center, which was built in 1911 to house a thousand inmates, it is said to be haunted by ghosts from the time that it was used as a prison, particularly in its converted solitary confinement cells and courtyard. Smoke is also said to appear at a spot near the entrance were a jail warden was killed while consuming a cigarette during a jailbreak.
- West Visayas State University, La Paz: The university's Quezon Hall, which was turned into a Japanese garrison during World War II, is said to be haunted by spirits from that period, while mirrors at the women's restrooms at the Rizal Hall were reportedly removed due to hauntings by the ghost of a murdered student.

=== Mandaue ===
- M.C. Briones Street: Accidents along this section of highway leading to Consolacion and other towns in northern Cebu have been attributed to angry spirits who were said to have been displaced after trees that surrounded the road were cut down to widen its lanes in the 1990s.
- Traffic Enforcement Agency of Mandaue Impounding Area: Located in the city's former market, witnesses have reported hauntings from impounded vehicles that were involved in fatal accidents, such as a truck from which crying sounds and other unexplained movements were reported until it was reclaimed by its owner, in addition to sightings of the spirits of the victims of the said accidents.

=== Naga ===
- An abandoned mansion located in Barangay San Felipe is said to be haunted by the spirits of one of its previous owners, a nun and a dark-skinned boy.

=== Tacloban ===
- San Jose District: Considered as the worst-affected area of the city during the storm surges generated by Super Typhoon Yolanda in 2013, it has since been said to be haunted by the spirits of those who died in the disaster.
- San Juanico Bridge: Motorists traveling along the bridge have reported seeing spirits who are said to be that of children who were victims of ritual sacrifices to ensure the bridge's construction.

== Provinces ==
=== Aklan ===
- Icamina House, Kalibo: The residence of former mayor Federico Icamina, it is said to be inhabited by ghosts and a kapre, with believing motorists honking their horns while passing by the house as a precaution.

=== Albay ===
- Bicol University, Legazpi: The campus is said to be inhabited by ghosts, a kapre who continues to appear despite its dwelling, a century-old acacia tree, being destroyed by Typhoon Glenda in 2014, and a phantom wild boar roaming inside the campus buildings.
- Padang, Legazpi: A white lady is said to have begun appearing in the barangay after it was devastated by lahar from Mayon Volcano during the onslaught of Super Typhoon Reming in 2006.

=== Aurora ===
- Millennium Tree, Maria Aurora: A balete tree said to be inhabited by multiple supernatural beings such as a kapre, a white lady, fairies, duendes and the ghost of a child who was murdered and buried inside the tree.

=== Bataan ===
- Kataasan Cemetery, Dinalupihan: A disused cemetery said to be haunted by spirits, particularly in a section containing an acacia tree.
- Las Casas Filipinas de Acuzar, Bagac: A hotel composed of Spanish era buildings gathered from across the country, guests have reported phantom knocking on bedrooms and flickering lights.
- Lazareto de Mariveles, Mariveles: The ruins of the former quarantine station, which was bombed by Japanese forces during the Battle of Bataan, are said to be haunted by ghosts from that conflict.

=== Batangas ===
- Arandia Residence, Lipa: The site of a 1994 massacre that saw the matriarch of the Arandia family and her two daughters fatally stabbed multiple times in a home invasion, the house was subsequently sold and rented out. Since then, several tenants have claimed to have experienced multiple paranormal encounters including seeing a figure seemingly stabbing them, hearing children’s footsteps and flickering lights.
- Fortune Island, Nasugbu: The abandoned island resort is said to be haunted by a white lady.
- Mount Macolod, Cuenca: Said to be haunted by the ghosts of hikers who died on the mountain, a vanishing hitchhiker who boards vehicles at the zigzag road at the base of the mountain, a guardian engkanto known as Mariang Pula (Red Maria), and other supernatural beings.

=== Benguet ===
- Aran Cave, Tuba: The disappearances of several workers during the construction of nearby Kennon Road and subsequent deaths and disappearances along the highway are blamed by believers on a man-eating giant that supposedly inhabits the cave, which is also known as Tukang Cave and is located between barangays Twin Peaks and Camp 3.
- Marcos Highway, Tuba: A section of the highway in Barangay Badiwan is said to be haunted, resulting in yearly vehicular crashes in the area according to residents.
- Mount Kalugong, La Trinidad: Settlers to the area reported nightly celebrations of the ghosts of indigenous Ibalois at the mountain's summit.

=== Bohol ===
- 2017 Bohol clashes sites, Inabanga, Clarin and Calape: Places where clashes occurred between government forces and Abu Sayyaf militants are said by residents to be haunted, with reports of phantom voices and cold spots. Strange lights have also been reported where killed Abu Sayyaf members were buried.
- Ambulances, Guindulman: Three accidents involving ambulances of the municipal government are blamed by some locals on the ghost of a patient who died after allegedly being denied the services of an ambulance.
- Binayran Road, Tagbilaran: Said to be haunted by entities including vanishing hitchhikers, an agta, a black dog, and phantom vehicles.
- Dr. Cecilio Putong National High School, Tagbilaran: Said to be haunted by duendes and ghosts, with believers also reporting cold spots, unexplained odors and phantom footsteps.
- Balete tree, Baclayon: Spirits said to be living in a tree in Barangay Guiwanon have been blamed by locals for vehicular accidents in the area.
- Holy Name University-Lessage Campus, Tagbilaran: Said to be haunted by the ghost of a woman and a giant dog.
- Holy Spirit School, Tagbilaran: Said to be haunted by a headless nun, with reports of noises from inside the campus despite it being abandoned.
- Kilab-Kilab Falls, San Isidro: Mysterious drum-like noises are heard in communities near the falls, which according to local folklore originate from engkantos celebrating the deaths of visitors to the falls in retaliation for the destruction of their habitat.
- Macaban Cave, Inabanga: Said to host a city of engkantos.
- Marapao Street, Tagbilaran: Said to be haunted by white ladies and an enchained ghost with flaming legs.
- Old Provincial Capitol building, Tagbilaran: Said to be haunted by headless ghosts from World War II.
- Pig-ot, Loon: Orbs, black ladies and other ghosts have been reported along a stretch of highway in the barangay, whose hilly portion is also said to a gathering place of engkantos.
- University of Bohol, Tagbilaran: Said to be haunted by a white lady and a red lady, as well as wailing noises.

=== Bukidnon ===
- Torre ni David, Malaybalay: Located along Sayre Highway in Barangay Cabangahan, the house was built by the Valmorida family, who still live there. It was originally known as Casa Alegre and was built in a baroque style in the late 1950s. It is also noted for its incongruous architecture, which is attributed to the Valmorida patriarch adding a segment for every child he begot. Inhabitants and passersby report unexplained noises, kapres and a white lady, prompting passing motorists to honk their horns to prevent apparitions.

=== Bulacan ===
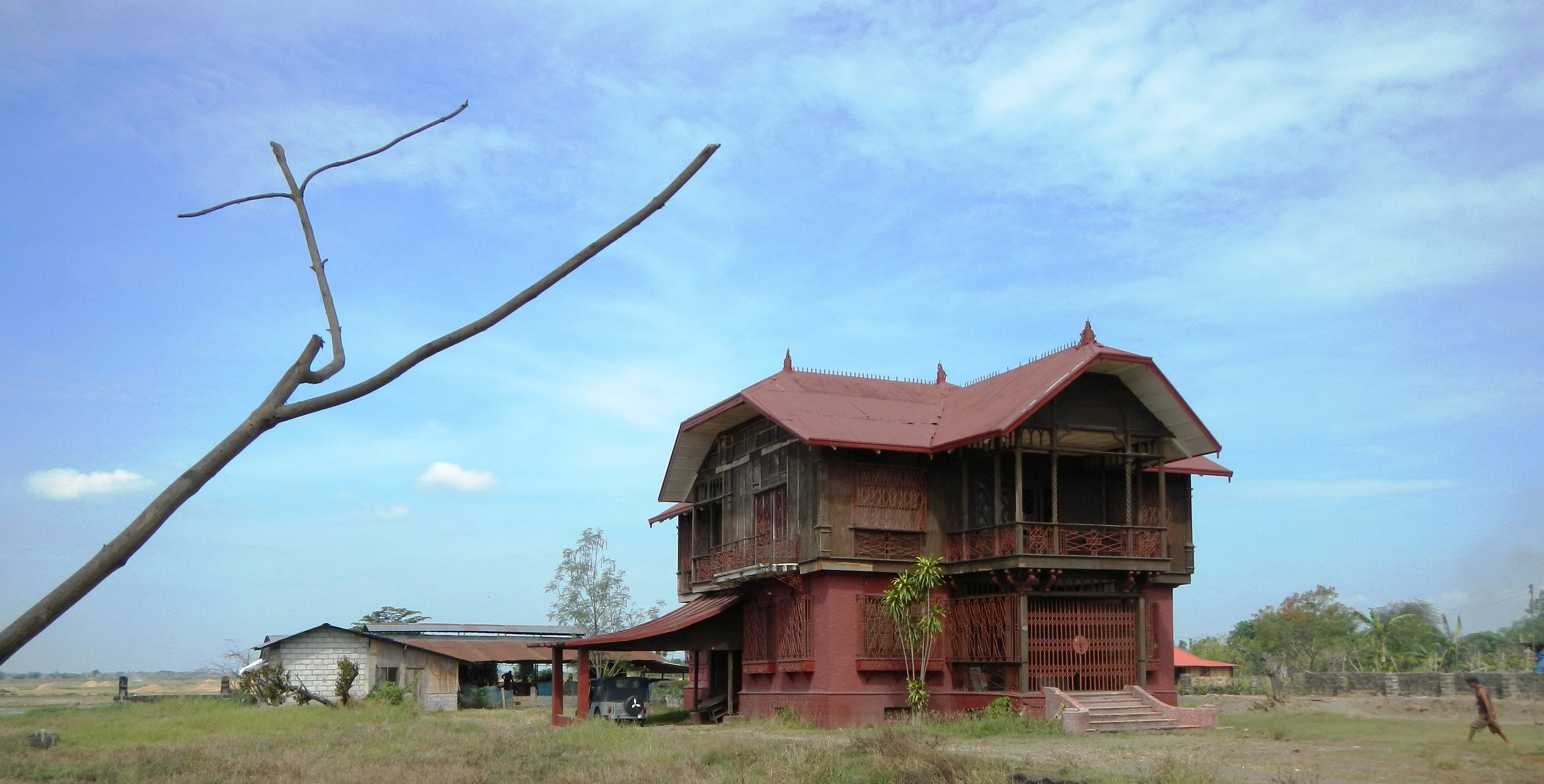
Bahay na Pula in 2014

- Bahay na Pula (or Ilusorio Mansion), San Ildefonso: A World War II site which the Imperial Japanese Army used as their barracks and became a place where comfort women were held. It was demolished in 2016 due to undisclosed reasons.
- Bulacan State University, Malolos: Said to be haunted by a hag who piggybacks on students.
- Doña Cristina Homes, Plaridel: Said to be haunted by a dark-colored figure.
- Ghost Town XVII, Baliuag: The Halloween theme park is claimed by its employees to be haunted by authentic ghosts.
- Mount Manalmon, San Miguel: Said to be inhabited by engkantos, the area became the setting for an urban legend regarding the death of actress Julie Vega at the age of 16 in 1985 from cardiac arrest caused by demyelinating disease. Residents believe that Vega was haunted by duendes while she was at the site for a shooting of the film adaptation of Lovingly Yours, Helen shortly before her death. Film crew at the site also reportedly saw engkantos, including one which looked like a bearded child, who were said to have been disturbed by their work.
- Rosaryville Subdivision, Guiguinto: Said to be haunted by a white lady.
- San Juan de Dios Church, San Rafael: The Spanish-era church was the site of a massacre during the Philippine Revolution in 1896 in which around 800 people died. Ghosts of children and a nun have been reported in its premises and in its convent.

=== Camarines Sur ===
- Casa de Rodriguez, Pili: The abandoned residence, which was built in 1951, is said to be haunted by several entities. Neighbors report a woman wailing every night for around 30 minutes inside the house.

=== Capiz ===
This province, located in Panay Island in Western Visayas, has been frequently associated as being the alleged home of the aswang, leading to stereotypes of its inhabitants as such. Recent scientific studies attribute such conceptions to a high prevalence in the province of a rare neurological description called X-linked dystonia parkinsonism, locally known as lubag, which was first discovered there in 1975 and whose symptoms closely resemble recorded descriptions of the aswang. It is estimated that 93% of current cases as of 2022 are located on Panay, and 63% of which are in Capiz.

=== Cavite ===
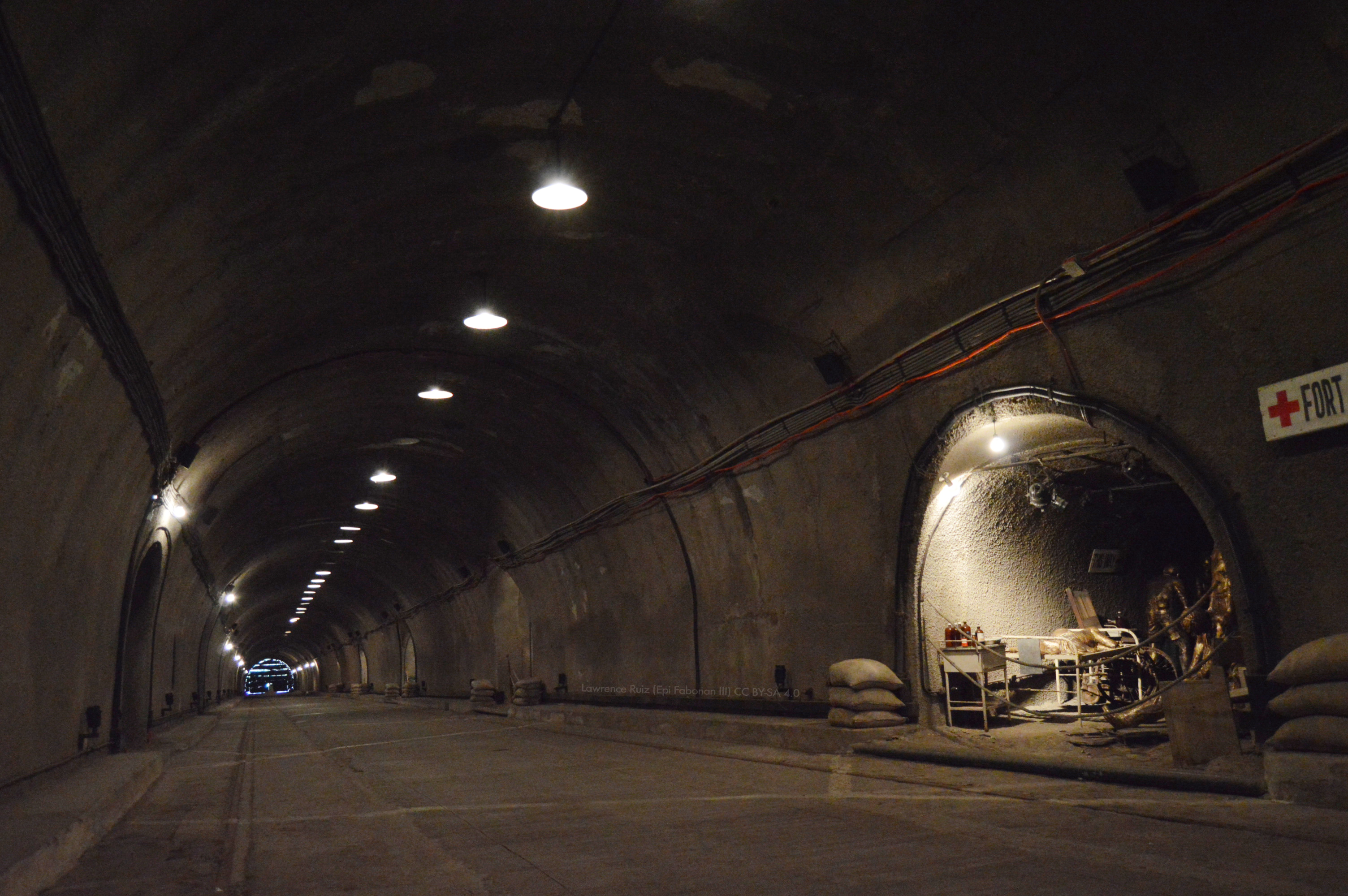
Malinta Tunnel, Corregidor

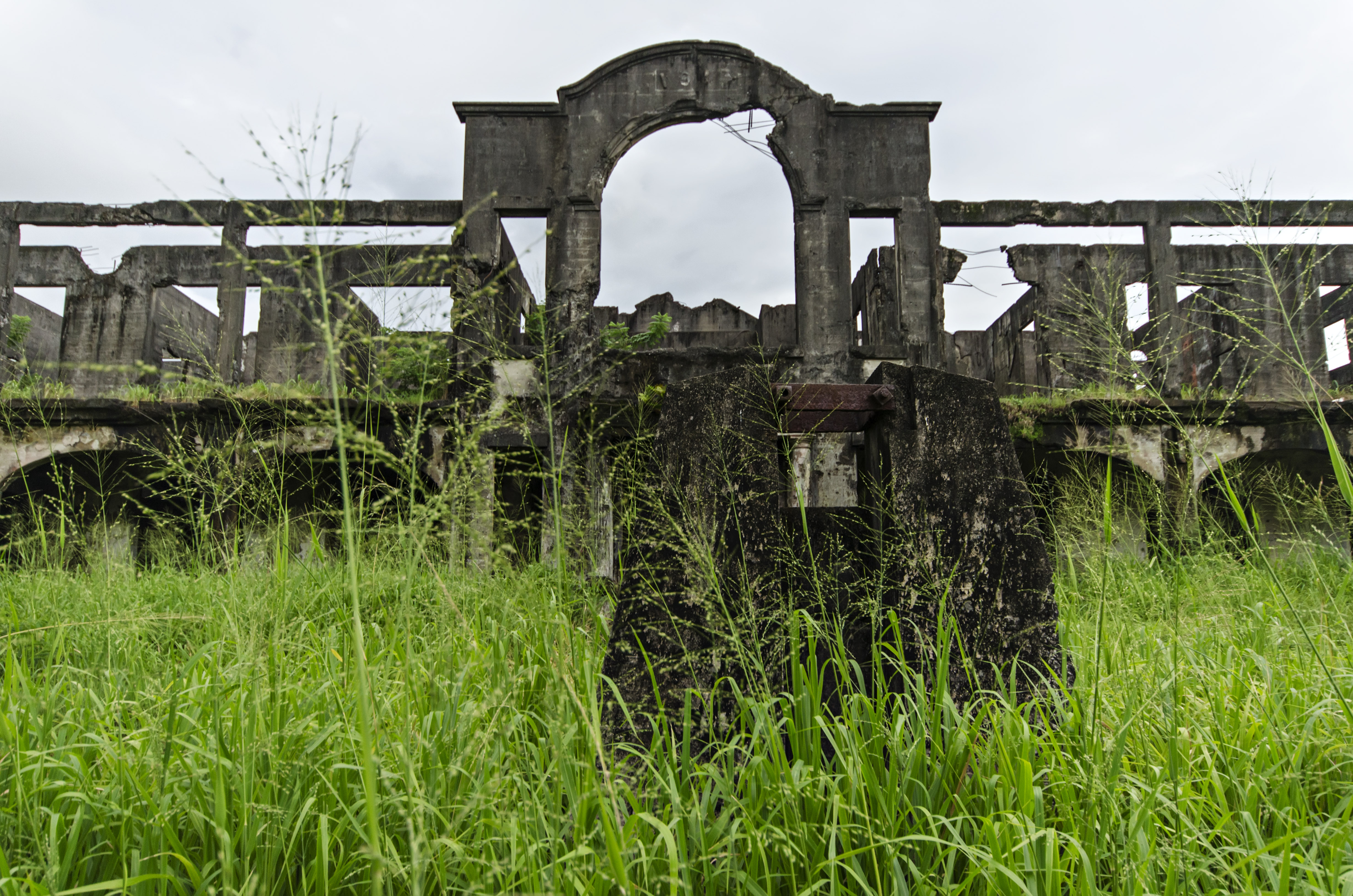
Ruins of Corregidor's hospital, where sounds of footsteps and normal hospital activities have been heard.

- Aguinaldo Shrine, Kawit: The residence and also resting place of former President Emilio Aguinaldo, it is said that he allowed a kapre to live at the back of the house in exchange for protecting him.
- Biangge House, Maragondon: Built in the 1880s, the house is said to be haunted by multiple beings including the ghost of an old man, a shadow and a large, hairy, dark-skinned figure dwelling at a mango tree inside the property.
- Bonifacio Trial House, Maragondon: The house where revolutionary leader Andres Bonifacio was tried and sentenced to death in 1897 is said to be haunted by a white lady and a woman wearing a baro't saya.
- Corregidor, Cavite City: The island played a major role during World War II, during the invasion and liberation of the Philippines from Japanese forces. The island and its ruins are attested by believers to be actively haunted by phantom platoons, white ladies and disembodied voices of American and Japanese soldiers. The Malinta Tunnel, a prominent structure on the island, was first used as a storage facility of the US Army during World War II, but was later converted into a hospital where injured soldiers were treated. Shadows, unexplainable noises, moans, groans and cries from within its walls, sudden draft of winds as well as temperature changes have been reported to manifest in the tunnel.
- Kaybiang Tunnel, Maragondon: The longest road tunnel in the Philippines, it lies along the Ternate–Nasugbu Road. Believers claim of spirits of people who died in accidents haunting the tunnel.
- Mount Pico de Loro, Ternate: Said to be haunted by the spirits of soldiers dating from World War II, when the mountain became part of a Japanese defensive line against advancing American forces in 1945.

=== Cebu ===
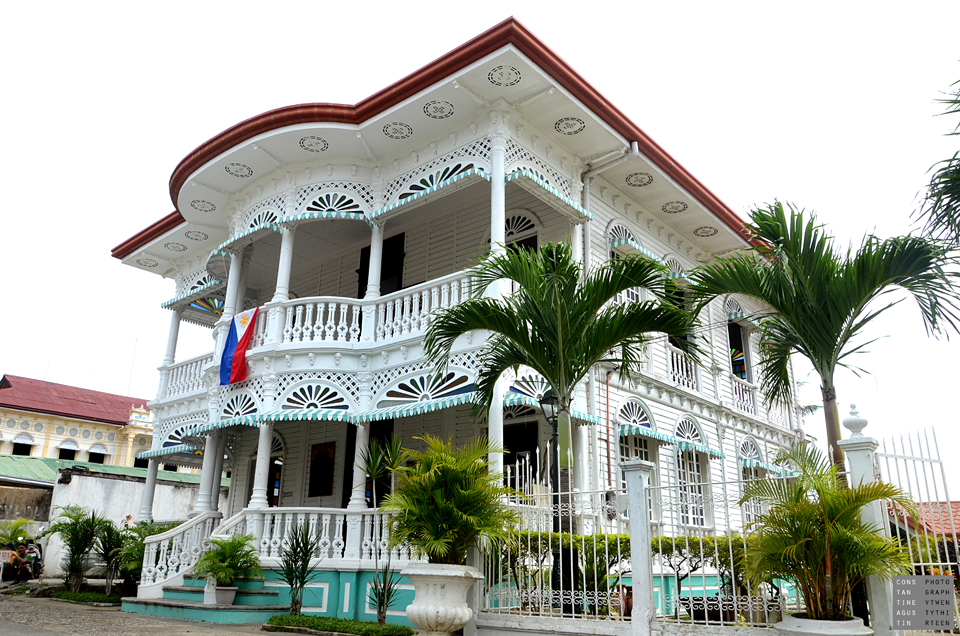
Carcar City Museum

- Argao: A ghost ship is said to sail the waters of the municipality to collect souls, particularly during typhoons, with residents warning those who spot it not to get on board. The Balay sa Agta cave in Barangay Conalum is named as such because it is said to be the home of an agta.
- Bukilat Cave, Tudela: Said to be inhabited by supernatural beings known as dili ingon nato who require visitors to make an uncooked chicken egg placed in a burning coconut shell stand upright in order to enter.
- Carcar City Museum, Carcar: A two-storey museum showcasing cultural items of the city. Originally established in 1929 as a dispensary to serve the people in distant areas, it was later converted into a museum in 2008. According to local historians, the building during World War II served as torture facility by the Japanese forces in which suspected supporters of the guerrillas were drowned at the now-deserted swimming pool. Among paranormal occurrences reported at the museum are presence of a woman in black, the sounds of children playing, faucets running on their own, wet footprints, and in one instance, a physical assault.
- Hilan, Alegria: Meaning "haunted" in Cebuano, a section of the coastal road in Barangay Legaspi where an old tree stands is said to be haunted by spirits who cause vehicular accidents. The area was said to have been a dumping ground for residents killed by the Japanese during World War II.
- Kawasan Falls, Badian: Drownings in the falls are blamed by locals on the “mantalaga,” a giant squid that is said to inhabit the falls' landing.
- Lambusan Public Cemetery, San Remigio: Located in Barangay Lambusan, it is situated in one of the poorest areas of the northern sector of the province. Several of the remains of the deceased were reportedly piled in a common area, as their families had insufficient funds to pay for the yearly rent of the tombs. Ghost sightings in the cemetery have been reported by believers.
- Lozada House, Dumanjug: Said to be haunted by a giant dark-colored spirit called Jankin who is said to have been an African-American who drowned in the Tañon Strait after being thrown overboard by his companion during a storm in World War II.
- Ponce residence, Talisay: The site of a family massacre in 2011 that saw the patriarch kill his wife and two of their children before committing suicide, residents have reported seeing a taxi dropping off three women in white who then enter the now-abandoned house at night in Barangay Tabunok, believed to be the spirits of the murder victims. A balete tree in front of the residence is also said to be haunted by an agta.
- Transcentral Highway, Balamban: A section of the highway in Barangay Gaas is said by residents to be haunted, resulting in vehicular accidents. At a mountainous curve in Barangay Cansumoroy, residents believe that several accidents, including one in 2010 that killed 21 people, are associated with vehicles suddenly halting at the site of a balete tree.

=== Cotabato ===
- Lake Venado, Kidapawan: Located along a hiking trail leading to Mount Apo, the lake is said to be inhabited by fairies who are blamed for drownings involving mountain climbers.

=== Davao del Norte ===
- Moncado White Mansion, Samal: One of the oldest existing houses in the Davao Region, the house was claimed to have been inhabited by members of a religious sect called the Moncadistas, who subsisted on a raw and vegan diet and whose men were required to sport long hair and beards as part of a perceived image of God. The house is said to be inhabited by at least six spirits, including that of an American, a gay person, a white lady, and a man shackled with chains and balls.

=== Davao Oriental ===
- Unidentified house, Mati: Former residents of an abandoned mansion in Barangay Simsimon have reported stairs creaking and other phantom noises in the house. Legend also claims that the house contains a portrait of a mother carrying a child suddenly crying blood as the latter turns into a tiyanak. Another alleged reason for the hauntings is attributed to the spirit of the original owner's father, who is said to be upset after his heirs left his remains at the house despite his instructions to bring them wherever they went.

=== Eastern Samar ===
- Homonhon, Guiuan: The island is claimed in Visayan folktales to be inhabited by engkantos and spirits of the deceased from other islands. It is also said that visiting Spaniards saw phantom communities while their vessels were either unmoored or submerged by unhappy spirits.

=== Ilocos Norte ===
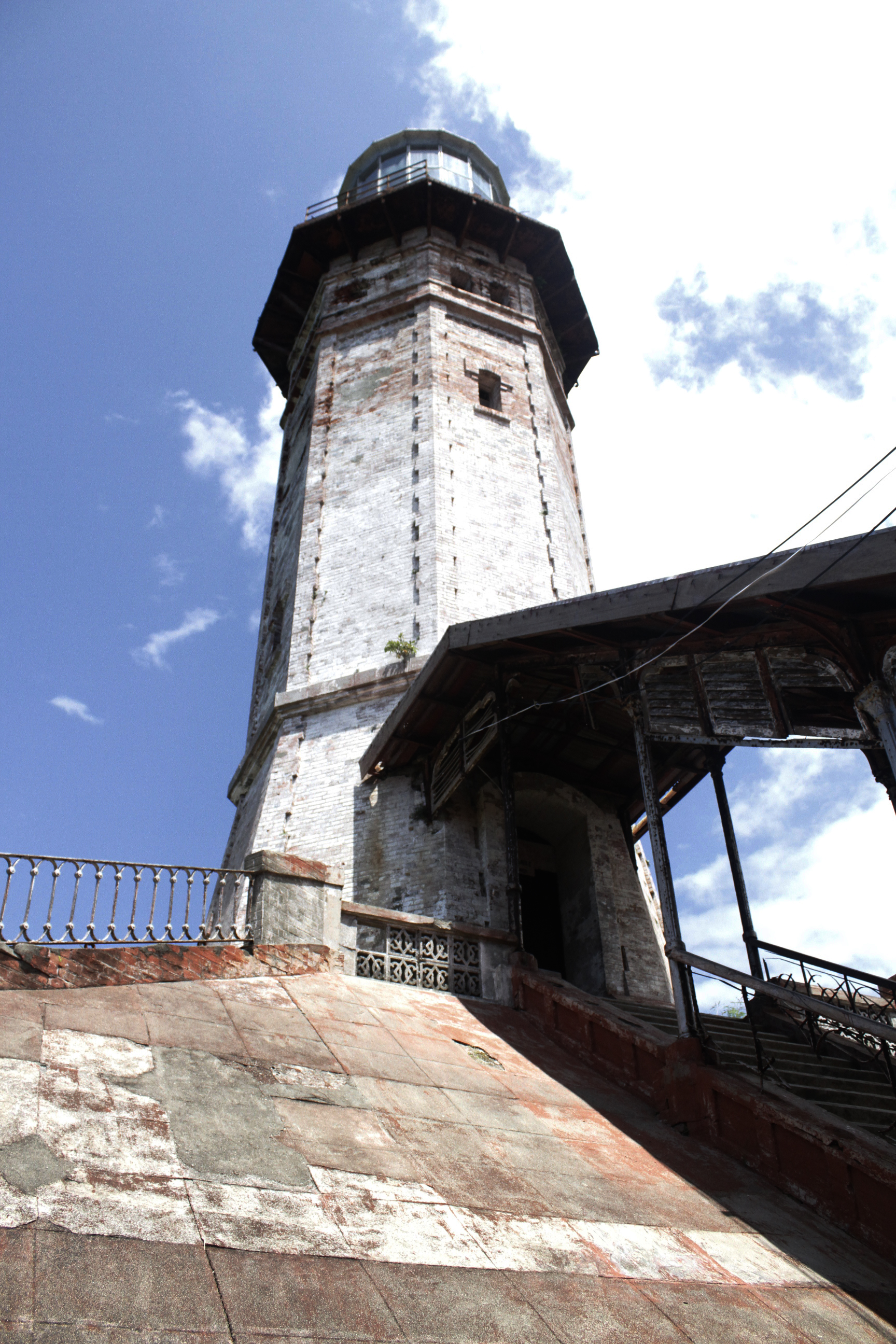
Cape Bojeador Lighthouse tower

- Banban, Bangui: The ruins of a Spanish-era church in the said barangay are said to be haunted by headless priests and other unexplained noises.
- Cape Bojeador Lighthouse, Burgos: According to local historian Pepito Alvarez, multiple construction workers died during the construction of the lighthouse, due to geographical difficulties. Believing visitors claim of ghosts haunting the lighthouse, including that of a bearded, Spanish-looking man.

=== Ilocos Sur ===
- Syquia Mansion, Vigan: A Spanish-era bahay na bato built in 1830, the house's living room (Sala Mayor) is said to be haunted by the ghost of a woman sitting in the room.

=== Iloilo ===
- Dueñas: The municipality has been associated with Teniente Gimo, a local politician who was said to be an aswang and became the basis of a subplot of the 1990 horror film Shake, Rattle & Roll II. However, reevaluations have cast doubt over the narrative of the legend, while residents protest that Teniente Gimo was either a nationalist hero whose reputation was maligned by colonial authorities, a landowner who was falsely accused of being an aswang as part of a tenancy dispute, or simply a community leader who was maligned out of envy.
- Taytay Guba, Pototan: The bridge is said to be visited at night by a ghost ship crewed by dead pirates from the Spanish era. Legend says that the ship damages the bridge's foundation every time it passes by, which is used to explain the structure's constant state of disrepair.
- Tumao: A vanishing city said to be located in a forest between Passi and Dumarao in neighboring Capiz province inhabited by a Mongolian-looking tribe of the same. Legend attributes a curved segment of the Panay Railway in the area to the pleas by its supernatural inhabitants to American engineers who built the railroad to bypass the forest rather than build the railroad through it.
- Vanishing Mansion, Guimbal: A mansion is sometimes said to appear in place of a century-old acacia tree along the national highway in front of Guimbal National High School. Duendes and white ladies are also said to linger near the spot. According to one story, a taxi driver dropped off a passenger from Iloilo City dressed in white at the mansion, only to find upon looking back that there was only the tree in its place.

=== Kalinga ===
- Mount Kechangon, Lubuagan: Said to be inhabited by guardian spirits called Tinakchi, with phenomena such as unexplained noises, disappearances and people being transported to distant places being associated with them.

=== La Union ===
- Cresta del Mar Resort, Bauang: An abandoned resort which was operational during the 1960s and claimed by believers to be haunted by the spirits of a headless person, a woman dressed in black and a kapre.
- Pindangan Ruins, San Juan: Said to be haunted by a headless priest.
- Provincial Capitol Complex, San Fernando: Said to be haunted by several entities from World War II and a child who was allegedly raped and killed in the area in 2012.

=== Laguna ===
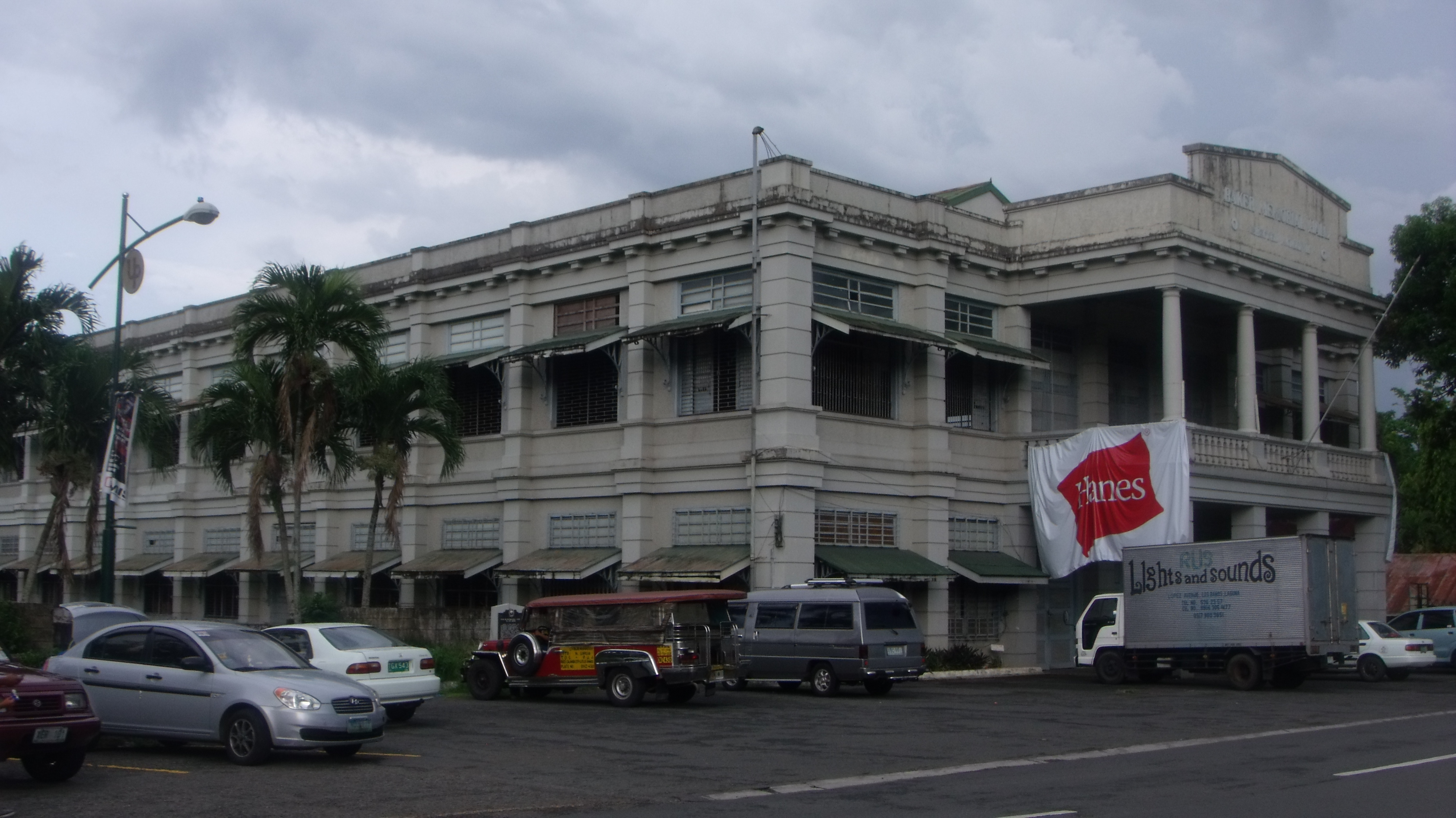
The Baker Memorial Hall of the University of the Philippines Los Baños

- Botocan Falls, Majayjay: Said to be inhabited by a fairy who offers money for anyone who brings a white cock to the place.
- Mount Makiling: Disappearances of men in the mountain have sometimes been attributed to the mountain's guardian deity, Maria Makiling, who is said to have taken them as her husband.
- Sampiruhan, Calamba: This barangay was the location of a massacre in World War II in which 70 people were brutally killed by the Japanese. The site of the massacre, marked by a candle-shaped monument, is claimed by believers to be haunted. It was featured in a Halloween special of telemagazine program Magandang Gabi... Bayan.
- University of the Philippines Los Baños Campus, Los Baños: A witness to the Second World War and the Japanese occupation. The Baker Memorial Hall was used as an internment camp of around 2,500 American and allied POWs and civilians from 1943 to 1945 and headquarters for the Imperial Japanese forces. Believers claim of garroted ghosts in the building. Other areas of claimed paranormal activities are the Narra Bridge, the Men's Dormitory, Main Library, Student Union Building, a footbridge near the UPLB CEAT (destroyed by Typhoon Milenyo in 2006), and Pili Drive.

=== Lanao del Sur ===
- Mindanao State University, Marawi: Said to be haunted of spirits of former residents, faculty and students.

=== Misamis Occidental ===
- Sapang Dalaga Falls, Sapang Dalaga: An engkanto is said to bathe in its waters every six in the evening.

=== Misamis Oriental ===
- Hotel de Barra, Opol: In 2019, an abandoned house in Barangay Barra was briefly turned into a horror house due to its history of hauntings that have driven out previous residences, including phantom footsteps and cold presences grabbing ankles.

=== Negros Occidental ===
- Balay Negrense, Silay: Also known as the Victor Gaston Ancestral House, it is a heritage site and a museum that was the home of a late-19th century sugar baron. Believing visitors claim of paranormal activities during their visits to the museum, including nighttime sounds of a kalesa at the back of the house.
- Bulwang, Binalbagan: A mountain road in the sitio is said to be inhabited by tamawos who are attributed for pulling downhill vehicles in the opposite direction.
- Haba Bridge, Candoni: Following a fatal motorcycle accident in 2014, residents near the bridge have claimed of a female ghost haunting the structure.
- The Ruins, Talisay: The mansion, which was burned down during World War II, is said to be haunted by a white lady believed to be the spirit of the original owner's wife, Maria Braga Lacson, who died in childbirth.
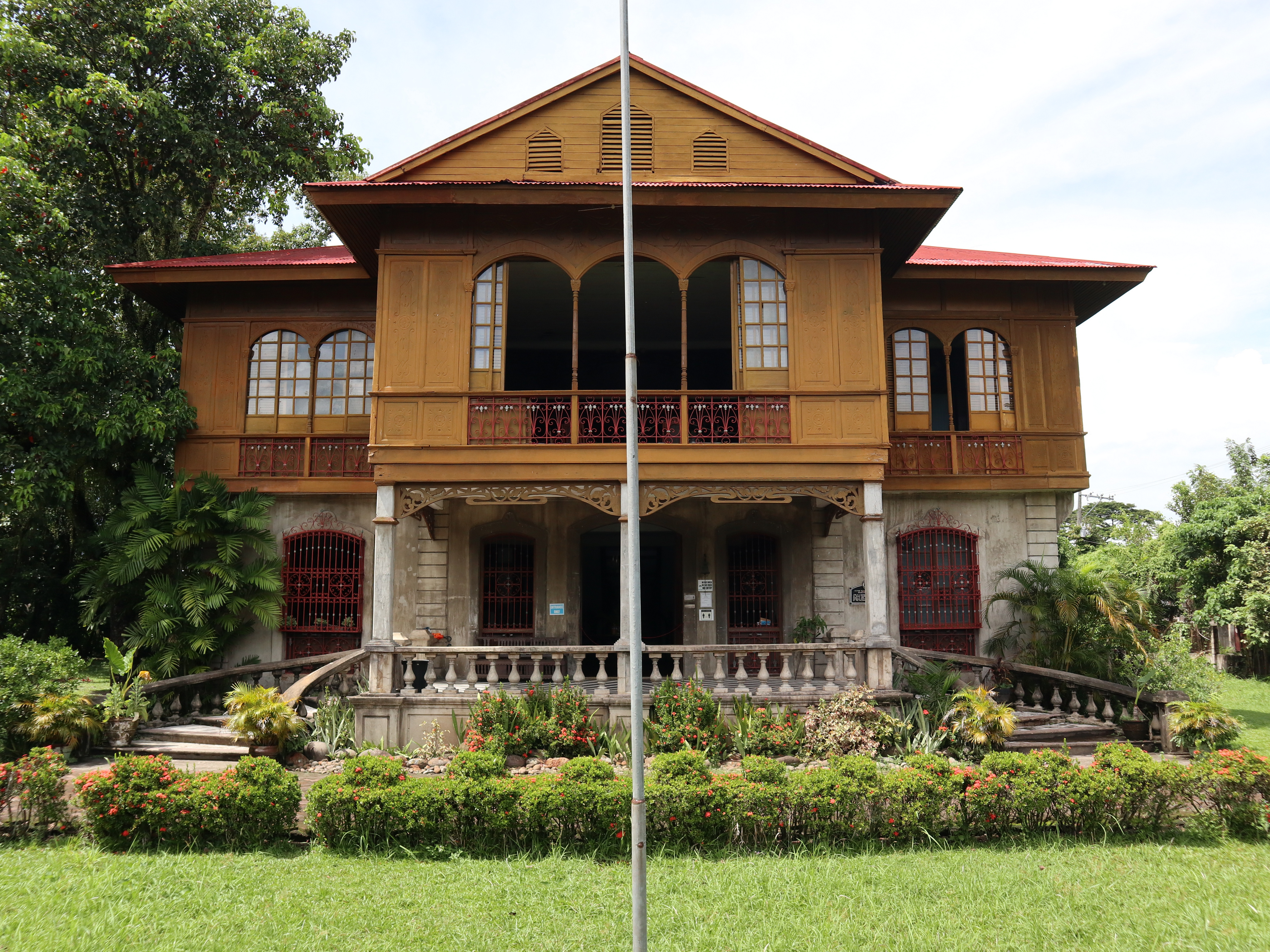
Balay Negrense

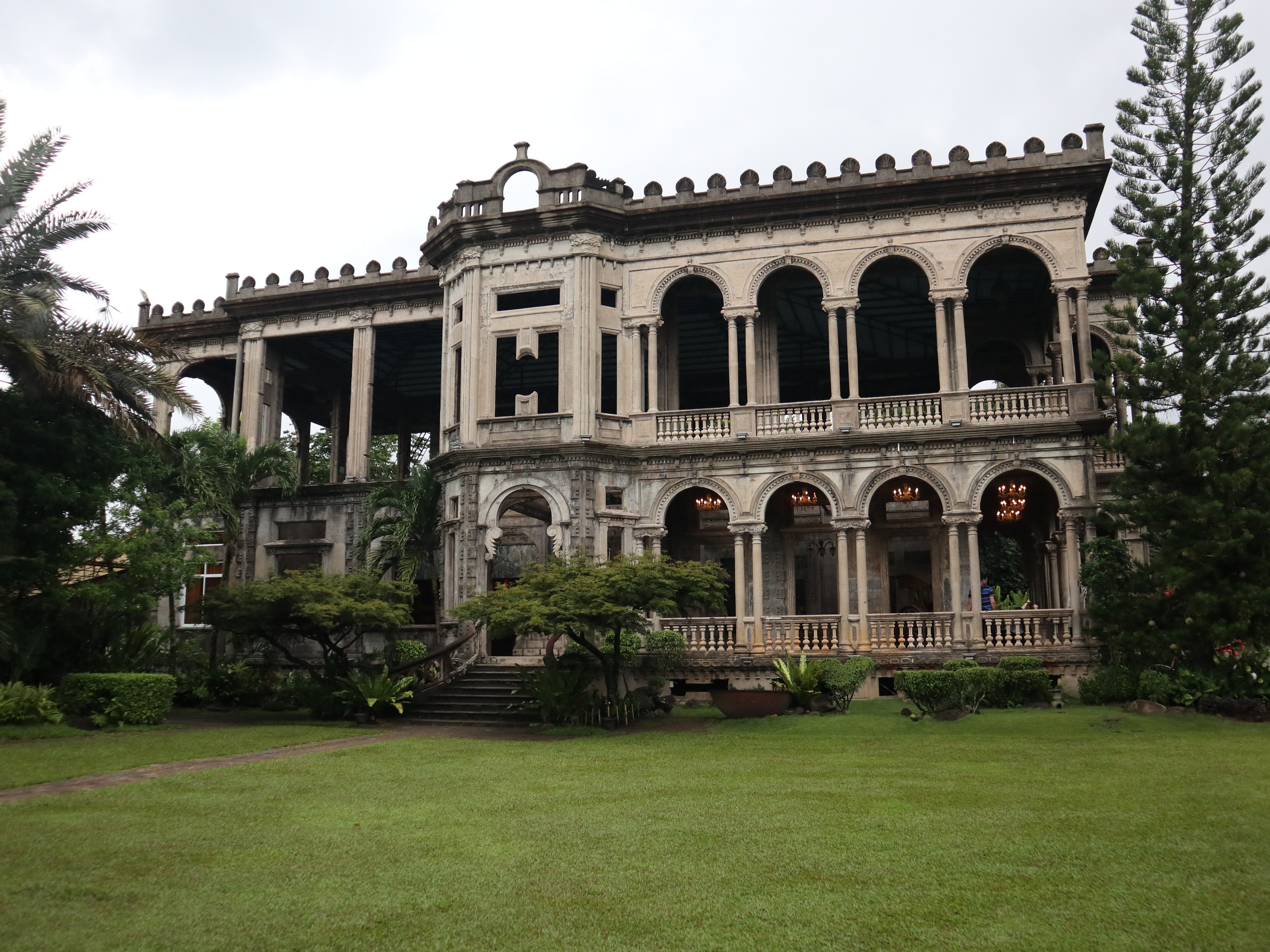
The Ruins

=== Negros Oriental ===
- Silliman University, Dumaguete: A prestigious Presbyterian institution, the institution is reported to be haunted. It was used as a station for Japanese forces during the Second World War. Notable haunted structures include the Katipunan Hall as well as three dormitory buildings; Edith Carson Hall, Channon Hall, and Doltz Hall. Channon Hall was used by the Japanese Kempeitai as their headquarters and torture chamber while Katipunan Hall, built and opened in 1916, originated as Dumaguete Mission Hospital and acted as the main hospital of the university as well as the general hospital of Dumaguete and its neighboring towns.

=== Nueva Ecija ===
- Minalungao River, General Tinio: Said to be inhabited by an engkanto blamed for several drownings.

=== Oriental Mindoro ===
- Bancuro, Naujan: A river in the barangay is said to be inhabited by a siyokoy blamed for several drownings.
- Bongabong: A cave in the municipality with a balete tree standing on top of it is said to be inhabited by an enchanted creature guarding a hoard of wealth.

=== Pampanga ===
- Bale Kastila, Floridablanca: Built in the Spanish era and regarded as the oldest house in the town, it is said to be haunted by the spirit of an old woman.
- Casa Nicolasa, San Fernando: The first bahay na bato to be built in the city, it is said to be haunted by the spirit of a woman standing by its windows. The house's piano is also said to play on its own.
- Clark Freeport and Special Economic Zone: Several locations within the area are also said to be haunted, including a building at the corner of Aguinaldo and Quirino Streets and the press center of the Clark Development Corporation in Quirino Street.
- Clark Air Base Hospital: Considered as the most haunted location in the Philippines, as it served as an asylum to wounded (and dying) American soldiers during the Second World War and the subsequent Vietnam War. Ghost Hunters International visited the hospital in 2009 and confirmed the paranormal activities in the site. It is said to believe that people who visit the hospital and sleep within eight hours after the visit experience nightmares and intense lucid dreaming for a week. The building is currently proposed to be converted into the regional branch of the National Museum of the Philippines in Central Luzon.
- Dalan Bayu Road, Guagua: Said to be haunted by the spirit of Mariang Kulut (Curly-haired Maria), who wears a white gown and sports long curly hair and appears to jeepney drivers traveling between Guagua and Floridablanca.
- Don Honorio Ventura State University, Bacolor: Said to be haunted by a kapre who lives in trees in front of the campus.
- FVR Megadike, Bacolor: Said to be haunted by the victims of traffic accidents, including a headless man and a man in red.
- MacArthur Highway: A section of the road between Bacolor and Guagua is said to be haunted by a hitchhiking white lady and a kalesa being driven by a headless coachman.
- Magalang Elementary School, Magalang: Said to be haunted by spirits from its time as a Japanese garrison and later, a burial ground for Filipino guerrillas during World War II.
- San Fernando River: A waterway running between the Pampanga River in Mexico and passing through San Fernando, Bacolor and Guagua before joining the Pasak-Guagua River in Sasmuan, its floods are blamed by believing locals on a feud between its resident goddess and demon.
- Tres Marias, Mabalacat: A trio of agusu trees near the gate to the Clark Freeport and Special Economic Zone that is named after three sisters who were said to have been killed and buried in that location. Their hauntings have been blamed for vehicular accidents in the area.
- Unidentified house, Lubao: A house in Barangay Prado Siongco is believed to be haunted due to it being constructed using parts from demolished houses, with its sink said to originate from a hospital morgue and emitting hair.
- Villa Epifania, Santa Rita: Built in the 1930s, the house is said to be haunted by spirits from World War II.

=== Pangasinan ===
- Angalacan River, Mangaldan: Said to be haunted by ghosts and other supernatural creatures who are blamed for drownings in the river.
- Cayanga, San Fabian: A stretch of coastline in the barangay is said to be inhabited by engkantos who are blamed for drownings in the area.
- Embarcadero Bridge, Alaminos: Said to be haunted by ghosts who are blamed for accidents on the bridge.
- Zigzag Road, Sual: Accidents in the area have been blamed on the spirit of a woman who was said to have been killed and dumped in the area in the 1970s and appears as a white lady.

=== Quezon ===
- Bitukang Manok, Atimonan: This segment of the Pan-Philippine Highway, named after its numerous switchbacks that have been compared to a chicken's intestine, is said to be haunted by a dark-skinned man whose appearance is regarded as an omen of disaster to motorists as well as beings who rock passing vehicles.
- Herrera Mansion, Tiaong: Also known as the Old Stone House, it is widely considered the oldest house in Tiaong, having been designed by Tomás Mapúa in 1920. Its original owners were Isidro and Juliana Herrera, but has been abandoned for many years and is now deteriorating due to decades of disuse. Believers claim of ghosts from the Japanese era.
- Madilim Road, Sampaloc: Meaning "dark", it is used to refer to a segment of road in Barangay Bayongon leading to Lucban that is said to be inhabited by a hitchhiking white lady.
- Mount Kamhantik, Mulanay: Said to be inhabited by engkantos who guard the mountain's ancient tombs.
- Mount San Cristobal, Dolores: Believing natives claim that the mountain emanates negative energy and is a so-called 'evil' foil to the holy Mount Banahaw nearby.

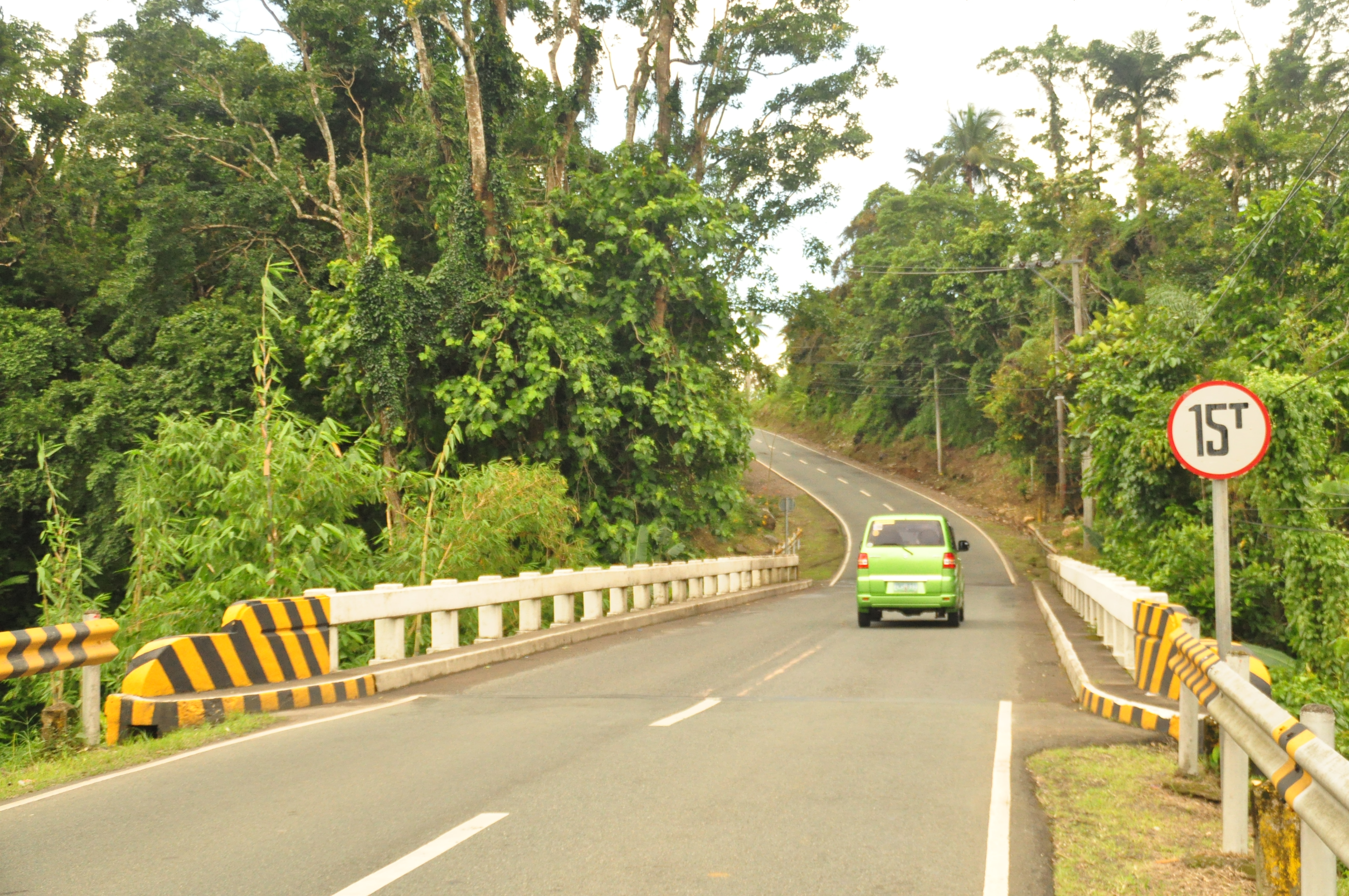
Prinsesa Bridge in 2014

- Princesa Bridge, Tayabas: Believing motorists claim the accident-prone bridge is haunted by a restless spirit.

=== Rizal ===
- Binangonan Church, Binangonan: In 1945, Japanese forces who took over the convent were said to have been driven out after a week by the nightly hauntings of a white lady.
- Calawis Bridge, Antipolo: Said by nearby residents and passing motorists to be haunted by the spirits of murder victims that were disposed of in the area and a white lady.
- Don Roman Santos House, Antipolo: Formerly located in Navotas, the house, which dates from 1917, was moved to its present location in 2002 by its owners to avoid flooding. One of its bedrooms is said to be haunted by the spirit of an elderly woman.
- Marigman Road, Antipolo: A compound along the road in Barangay San Roque is said to be haunted by beings such as a tikbalang, a kapre and a white lady.
- Puente de Diablo, Binangonan: Maritime accidents in the promontory along Laguna de Bay are said to be caused by malevolent spirits residing there.

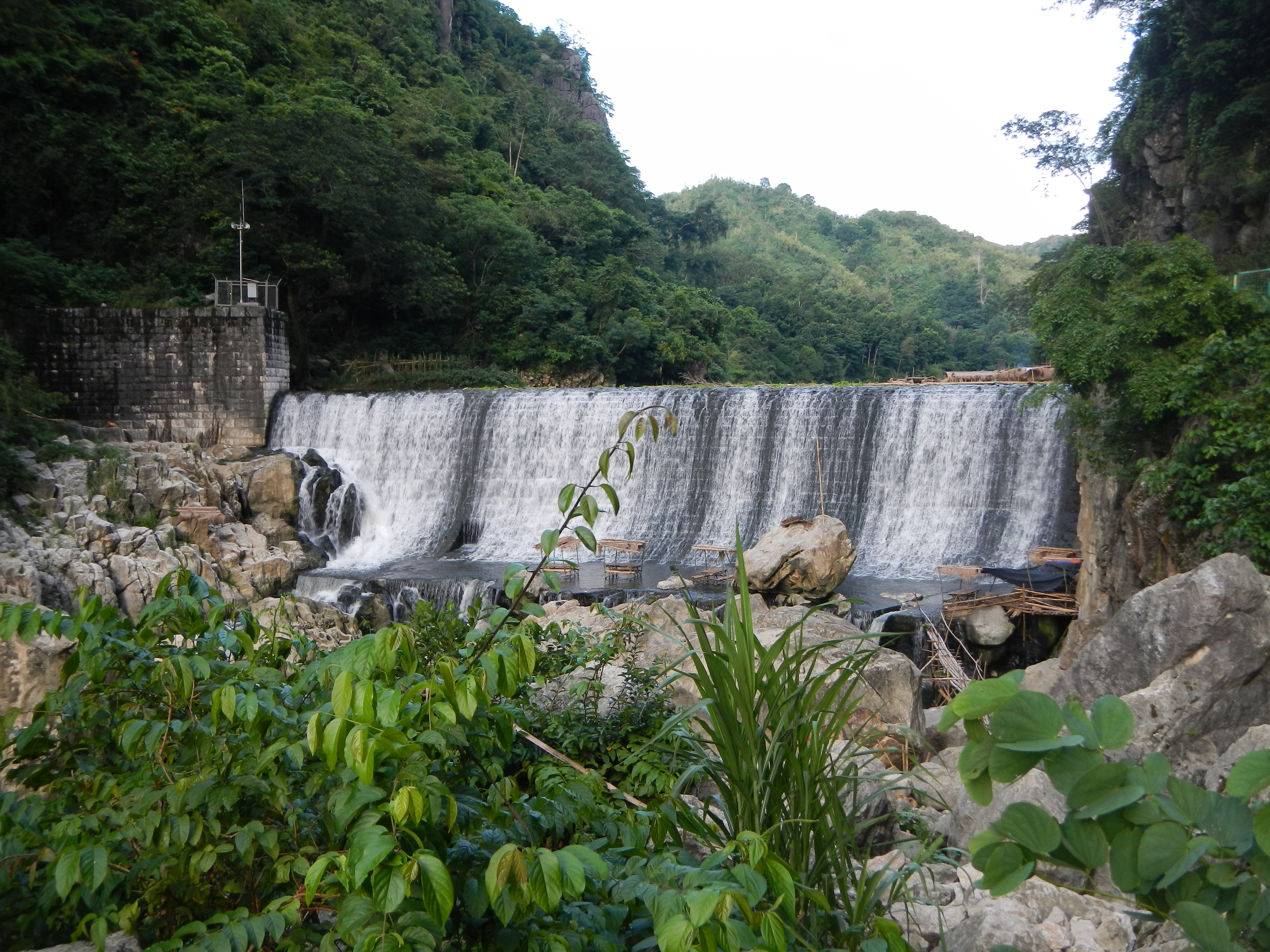
Wawa Dam

- Wawa Dam, Rodriguez: Built on the Marikina River by the Americans in 1909, at least 40 drowning deaths in the area have been claimed to have been caused by paranormal occurrences involving an engkanto, while other accounts claim the responsible being to be the spirit of a mortal woman seeking revenge on men for disputed reasons.

=== Romblon ===
- Mount Calatong, Santa Fe: Said to be inhabited by engkantos who are said to sometimes descend on nearby communities. Sightings are also reported of ghost ships off its coastline and a vanishing city on the mountain seen from the air by Japanese pilots during World War II.
- Romblon Triangle: A stretch of sea in the province has been the site of major maritime disasters in the Philippines such as the sinking of the Japanese battleship Musashi, the MV Don Juan, the MV Doña Paz, and the MV Princess of the Stars, leading to comparisons with the Bermuda Triangle. It is said that a ghost ship captained a figure called "Lolo Among" sails these waters, and was blamed in legends for causing the captain of the Don Juan to collide with an oil tanker in an effort to avoid a collision with the phantom vessel in 1980. Other instances of hauntings include sightings by fishermen of an orb of light at sea and unexplained malfunctioning of equipment during salvage efforts for the Princess of the Stars.

=== Samar ===
- Biringan: Believing residents claim this modernistic yet mythical city appears between the towns of Pagsanghan and Gandara, and is regarded in folklore as the home of engkantos. Those who enter it are claimed to never return. Believers claim there are seven portals leading to the city scattered across Samar island, one of which is said to be located at an old tree inside the campus of the Northwest Samar State University in Calbayog. The phantom city is also the basis of the 2009 horror film T2, directed by Calbayog native Chito Roño. It was featured in a 2022 episode of Kapuso Mo, Jessica Soho and in the 2024 edition of Noli de Castro's Kababalaghan: Pagkagat ng Dilim Halloween special.

=== Siquijor ===
This island-province in the Negros Island Region has been commonly associated with mystic traditions that the island's growing tourism industry capitalizes on, including tales of sorcery. A ghost ship, known locally as tayog-tayog is also said to appear in the waters of Lazi, although a 2019 investigation by the GMA Network newsmagazine program Kapuso Mo, Jessica Soho and the Philippine Coast Guard found that the lights associated with the apparition were caused by regularly scheduled vessels passing through the area.

=== Surigao del Sur ===
- Hinatuan Enchanted River, Hinatuan: Locals attribute its pristine and blue waters to engkantos and other supernatural beings who guard the place and prevent anyone from catching fish from its waters.

=== Tarlac ===
- Concepcion North Central School, Concepcion: Said to be haunted by the spirit of American school director Frank Russell White, who died of tuberculosis in 1913.

=== Zambales ===
- Mapanuepe Lake, San Marcelino: Created by the damming of the Mapanuepe River by volcanic debris from the 1991 eruption of Mount Pinatubo, it is said to be inhabited by mermaids.

=== Zamboanga del Norte ===
- Balay Hamoy, Dapitan: The residence of a friend of Philippine national hero Jose Rizal during his exile, it is said to be haunted by several ghosts.
- José Rizal Memorial Protected Landscape, Dapitan: The residence of Jose Rizal during his exile from 1892 to 1896, he reported incidents of poltergeists haunting his common-law wife Josephine Bracken in a house on the property in 1895.

=== Zamboanga del Sur ===
- Lake Wood, Lakewood: Said to be inhabited by a giant, man-eating, fish-like creature called the "Busiso" which is attracted by a certain Subanen chant. This has led to a superstition against singing while sailing along the lake.

== See also ==
- Ghosts in Filipino culture
- List of reportedly haunted locations
- Philippine mythical creatures
