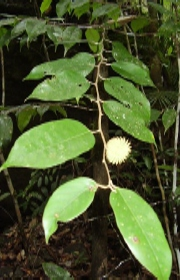

Conservation status
- Endangered (IUCN 3.1)

Scientific classification
- Kingdom: Plantae
- Clade: Tracheophytes
- Clade: Angiosperms
- Clade: Eudicots
- Clade: Rosids
- Order: Malvales
- Family: Dipterocarpaceae
- Genus: Shorea
- Species: S. astylosa

Binomial name
- Shorea astylosa Foxw.

= Shorea astylosa =

Species of tree

Shorea astylosa is a species of plant in the family Dipterocarpaceae. It is endemic to the Philippines, where it is known as yakal in the Filipino language.

Yakal is a medium to large tree about 25 to 30 meters tall. Its wood is hard and dark brownish-yellow, its branchlets slender, blackish, and slightly hairy.

Its leaves are coriaceous, ovate to lanceolate, or oblong-lanceolate or apex acuminate. The base are rounded to cuneate, glabrous above and slightly hairy underneath. Its blade is 6.5-nine centimeters long and two-4.5 centimeters wide, with its petiole slender, 10-23 millimeters long, and dark.

Its inflorescence are axillary, paniculate, and up to about six centimeters long, with its flowers yellow, very short-stalked, and about 12 millimeters long. The flowers' petals are narrowly oblong or oblong-lanceolate, more or less twisted in bud, rounded at apex, 18 millimeters long, and reticulate.

== Habitat ==
Yakal is commonly found in Luzon island, particularly in the Quezon and Camarines areas, as well as in the islands of Samar, Negros, and Mindanao (particularly in the island's Zamboanga, Agusan, and Davao regions). It can also be found in primary forests at low altitudes.

== Uses ==
=== Traditional use ===
Traditional wood extractions of yakal are due to the wood's being tumor-inhibiting.

=== Contemporary use ===
Contemporary harvests of yakal are for high-grade construction, bridges and wharves, mine timber, and other installations requiring high strength and durability.
