= Balete =

Balete may refer to:

- Balete people, a Southern African Tswana tribe
- Balete tree, a tree in the Philippines related to the banyan
- Balete, Aklan, a municipality in the province of Aklan, Philippines
- Balete, Batangas, a municipality in the province of Batangas, Philippines
- Balete Drive, a thoroughfare in Quezon City, Philippines
- Danilo S. Balete, Filipino biologist with botanic abbreviation Balete
