= Mariana, Quezon City =

Barangay in Metro Manila, Philippines

Mariana New Manila
- Barangay
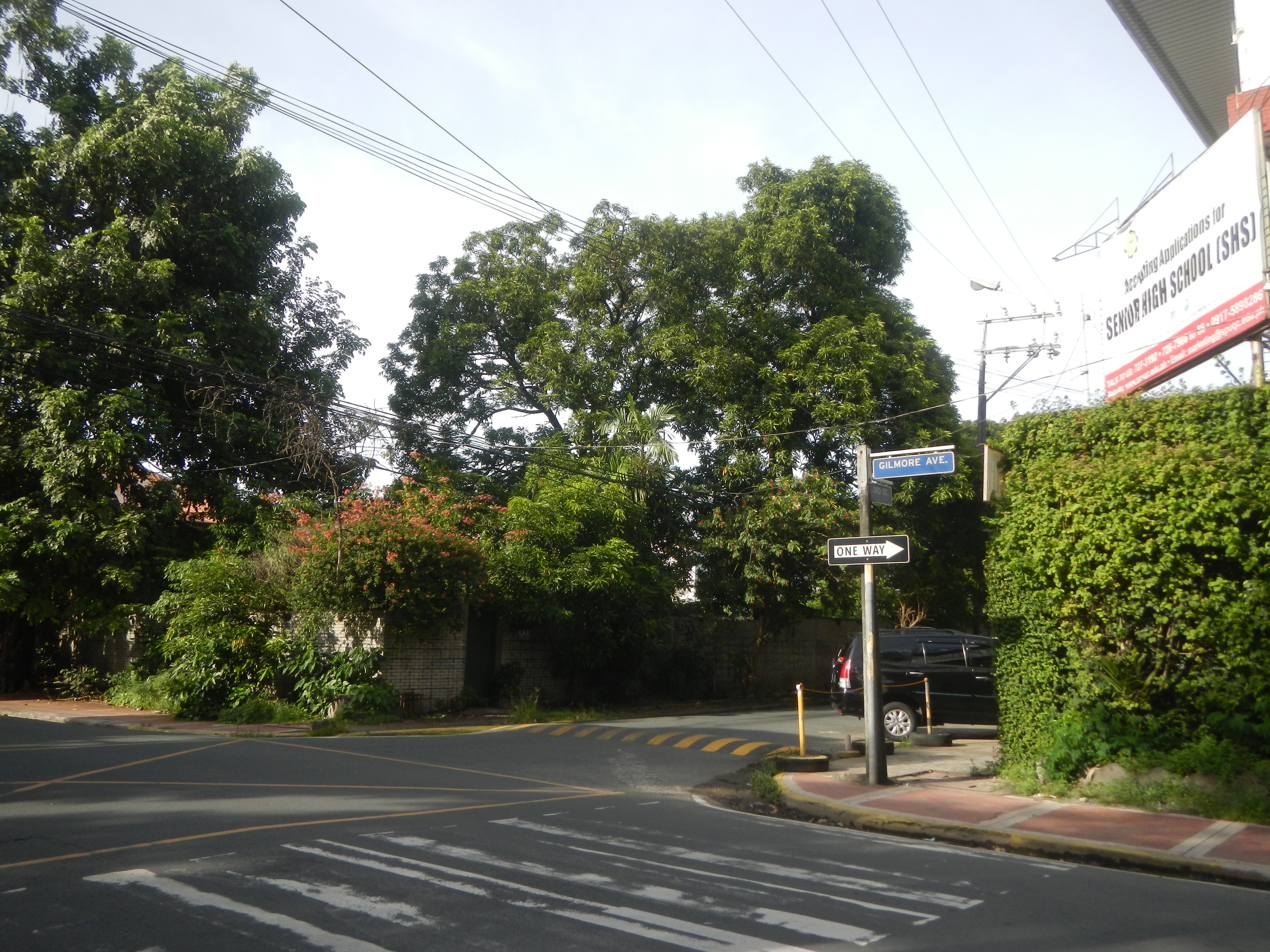
- Gilmore Avenue and 3rd St

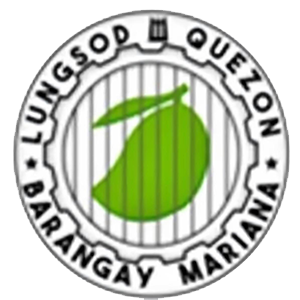
- Seal
- Interactive map of Mariana
- Location within Metro Manila
- Coordinates: 14°37′10″N 121°02′05″E
- Country: Philippines
- Region: National Capital Region
- City: Quezon City
- District: 4th District
- Established: August 21, 1961

Government
  - Type: Barangay
  - Barangay captain: Regine C. San Miguel

Area
  - Total: 1.66 km^{2} (0.64 sq mi)

Population (2020)
  - Total: 11,967
  - Density: 7,209/km^{2} (18,670/sq mi)
- Time zone: UTC+8 (PST)
- Postal Code: 1112
- Area code: 2
- PSGC: 137404060
- Website: Facebook

Mariana is an urban barangay in Quezon City, Metro Manila, Philippines. It is part of a middle class residential development known as New Manila, which includes Barangay Mariana and the adjacent barangays of Damayang Lagi, Horseshoe, and Valencia.

Originally a hinterland along the San Juan River at the outskirts of Manila, the area was purchased from friar lands and other estates by Doña Magdalena and Kemal H. Hemady in the 1920s, developing it into the first gated community outside of Manila.

Following World War II, the area experienced significant changes with the development of schools, churches, and the commercialization of adjacent areas. New Manila eventually ceased to become a gated community, with only some roads remaining gated at certain hours of the day, spurring the decline of low-density suburbia in favor of mixed-use and higher-density developments.

== History ==
Prior to the 1920s, the area that would become known as New Manila was once a hilly, underdeveloped hinterland along the shoreline of the San Juan River, at the outskirts of Manila. Eventually, as Manila became crowded, noisy, and polluted, new developments in the nearby San Juan became popular among middle-class families for a much more quiet and peaceful place to live. Thus, the reason it was named New Manila as the place's original settlers moved from Manila.

=== Manila Heights subdivision ===
Kemal and Magdalena Hemady in 1931.

In the 1920s, Lebanese immigrant Doña Magdalena Hemady purchased 1,000 ha (10 km^{2}) of land from Augustinian Order friar lands bought by the Taft Commission as a result of Act No. 1120, also known as the Friar Lands Act of 1904. These lands acquired by Doña Hemady became known as the Hacienda de Magdalena (Magdalena Estate), including parts of the Ortigas-owned Hacienda de Mandaloyon.

On March 28, 1922, the estate was incorporated. Hemady and her second husband Kemal H. Hemady, as well as family members Felipe Ysmael and Halim Ysmael, and Sidney C. Schwartzkopf served as the estate's directors. From 1922 to 1923, it was developed into the Manila Heights Subdivision as a residential enclave for the elite. As a result, Hemady became the first real estate developer in the Philippines and the first to establish a gated community outside of Manila. The lots along the subdivision's main roads, namely Victoria Avenue, Broadway Avenue, Gilmore Avenue, and Pacific Avenue (now Doña Hemady Avenue) were cut at no less than 2,000 m^{2} (0.20 ha) per corner. On the other hand, lots along the side streets, numbered 1st to 13th after the numbered streets in New York City, measured at approximately 1,000 m^{2} (0.10 ha) each.

In 1937, the New Manila area gained recognition as the "Hollywood of the Philippines", being home to Sampaguita Pictures (along Granada Street, now located in Barangay Valencia), as well as its rival, LVN Pictures, just along Benitez Street, being one of the first companies that produced original Filipino films.

=== Post-war developments ===
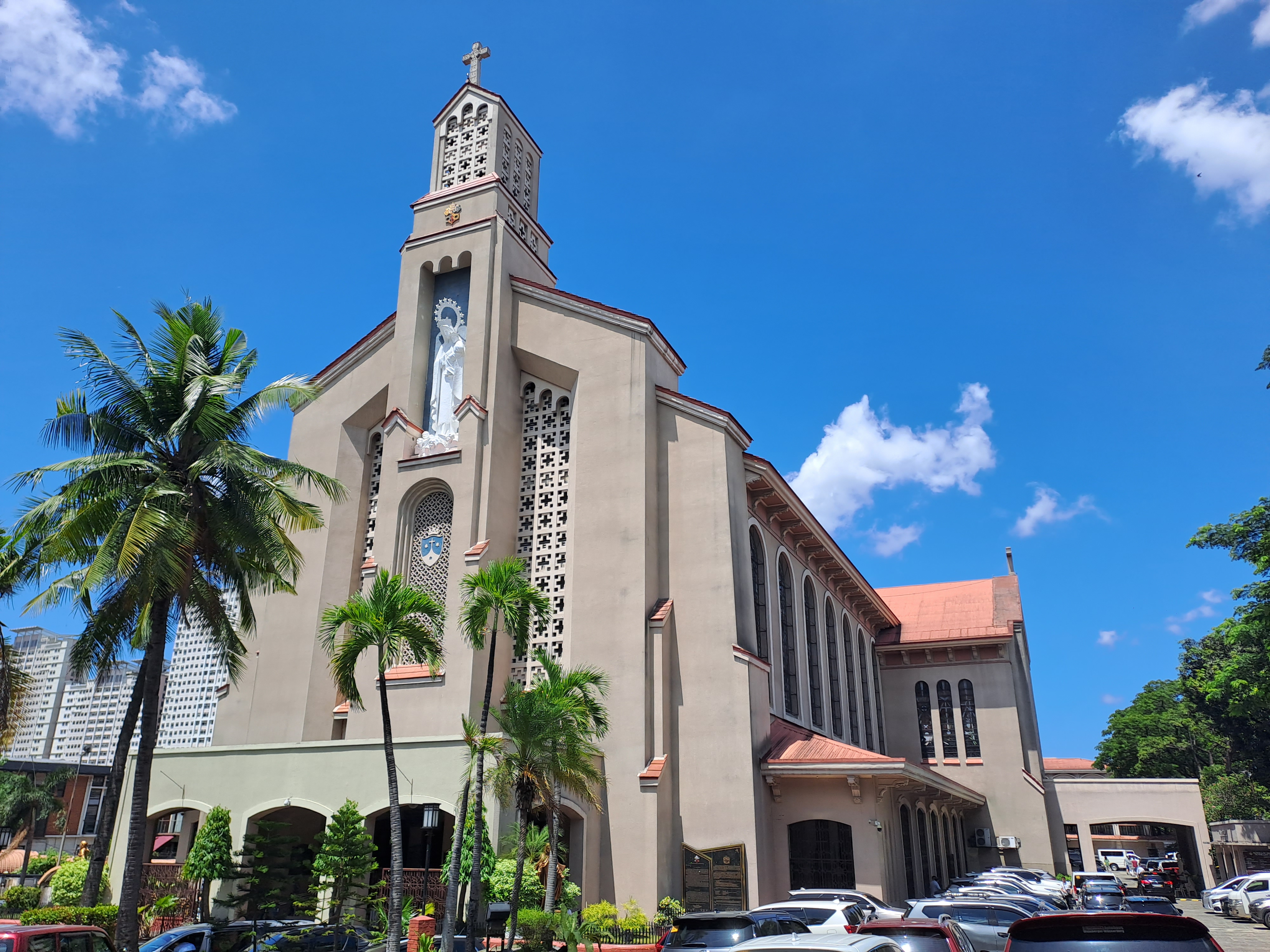
The Mount Carmel Shrine minor basilica in Barangay Mariana

Throughout the 1940s, being far from Manila, the area was able to survive with minimal ruin during World War II. This has led to increased development throughout the 1950s and 1960s around the area, as schools, churches, hospitals, and other institutions were set up in New Manila.

In 1946, the St. Paul University System set up a Quezon City branch in New Manila, which would be known as St. Paul College Quezon City (now St. Paul University Quezon City). This was followed by the evangelist Jubilee Christian Elementary School (now Jubilee Christian Academy) moving into a new elementary campus across St. Paul in 1980 and a high school and preschool campus just outside New Manila along E. Rodriguez Sr. Avenue in 2002 and 2003.

In 1954, the Carmelites purchased a 17,155 m^{2} (1.7 ha) property along Broadway Avenue to construct the Chapel of Our Lady of Mount Carmel (now known as Mount Carmel Shrine). It was inaugurated on July 16, 1964, on the feast day of Our Lady of Mount Carmel, and was declared a parish in 1975.

In 1961, the Dispensary of St. Luke the Beloved Physician (now St. Lukes Medical Center) moved from its original 52-bed hospital in Tondo, Manila to a new property along E. Rodriguez Sr. Avenue, within reach of New Manila. That same year, the New Manila area was included in the barrio of Mariana in through Quezon City Ordinance No. 4816, which was later converted into a barangay in the 1970s. It was named after Mariana Wilson, one of the original residents of the New Manila area who was known among its residents for spearheading many of social activities within the community.

=== Present day ===
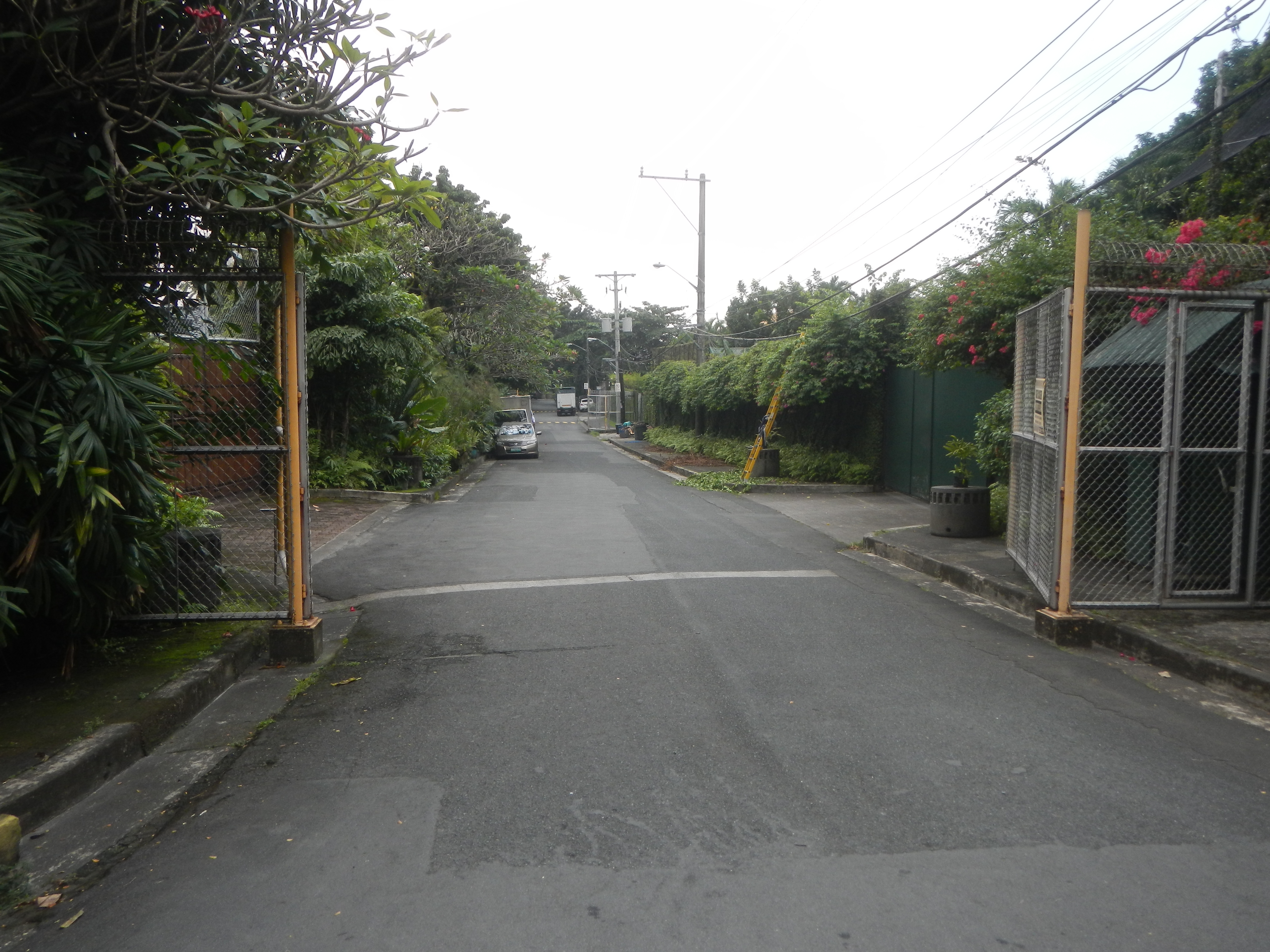
A gated area within Barangay Mariana, located along 9th Street.

The continuing migration of middle-class families towards new suburban developments outside of Manila resulted in available housing in the New Manila area to reach its peak in 1961. At some point as well, the New Manila area ceased to exist as a gated community and was completely opened to outside traffic, with only some roads remaining gated at certain hours of the day. As a result, throughout the 1980s, many of the original, large suburban houses were replaced by higher density developments such as townhouses, condominiums, and mixed-use complexes.

In 2012, the Quezon City government allocated a budget of ₱9.94 million to move the Quezon Heritage House, a 3,678 m^{2} (0.3678 ha) two-storey house owned by former Philippine president and city namesake Manuel L. Quezon from its original location along Gilmore Avenue to a dedicated area within the Quezon Memorial Shrine. The reconstructed house was opened to the public on October 21, 2013 by Quezon City mayor Herbert Bautista and vice mayor Joy Belmonte.

In 2021, parts of the sidewalk along Doña Hemady Avenue were redeveloped as part of Quezon City's Green, Open, Renewable, Access (GORA) Lanes, a 5.39 km (3.35 mi) pedestrian corridor spanning Doña Hemady Avenue, Scout Tobias Street, and Mother Ignacia Avenue in an effort to improve walkability and accessibility.

== Geography ==
Mariana and Damayang Lagi are among 19 barangays in Quezon City that are considered to be prone to liquefaction. Both barangays are located on an adobe clay loam soil referred to as the Novaliches Clay Loam, which is the predominant type of soil in Quezon City. The slope of the area also ranges from a slope gradient of 5 to 15 percent.

Both Mariana and Damayang Lagi are classified to be at medium-low risk in the event of a 7.2 magnitude earthquake due to its proximity to the Marikina Valley Fault System. In terms of flood hazards and vulnerability, Damayang Lagi is classified to be at high risk, among the highest of all barangays in the city, while Mariana, on the other hand, is classified to be at low risk.

=== Boundaries ===
The political borders of Mariana are defined on land by the España Boulevard Extension (now E. Rodriguez Sr. Avenue), Ilang-ilang Street, Rosario Drive, Victoria Avenue, and Aurora Boulevard, while its water boundaries are defined by the Salapan Creek (also known as the Ermitaño Creek).

It is bordered by Barangay Damayang Lagi to the west, Barangays Kalusugan, and Kristong Hari to the north, Barangay Immaculate Concepcion to the east, Barangays Kaunlaran and Valencia to the south, and San Juan's Barangay Ermitaño to the southwest.

== Education ==
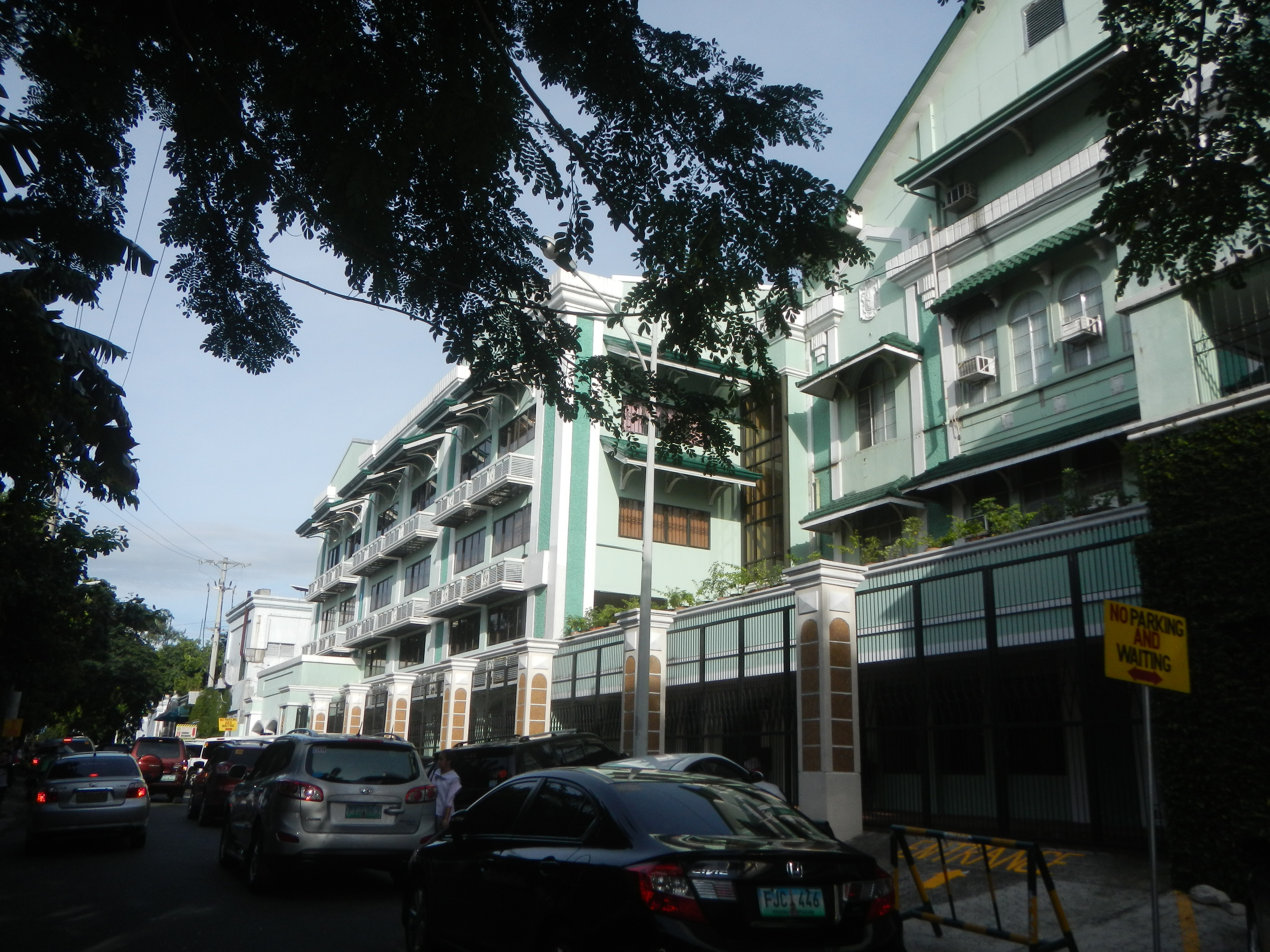
St. Paul University Quezon City

- DML Montessori School - Quezon City
- Foundation for Carmelite Scholastics
- Jubilee Christian Academy - Hemady Campus
- St. Paul University Quezon City

== Health ==
- Mariana Barangay Hall Clinic

== Landmarks ==
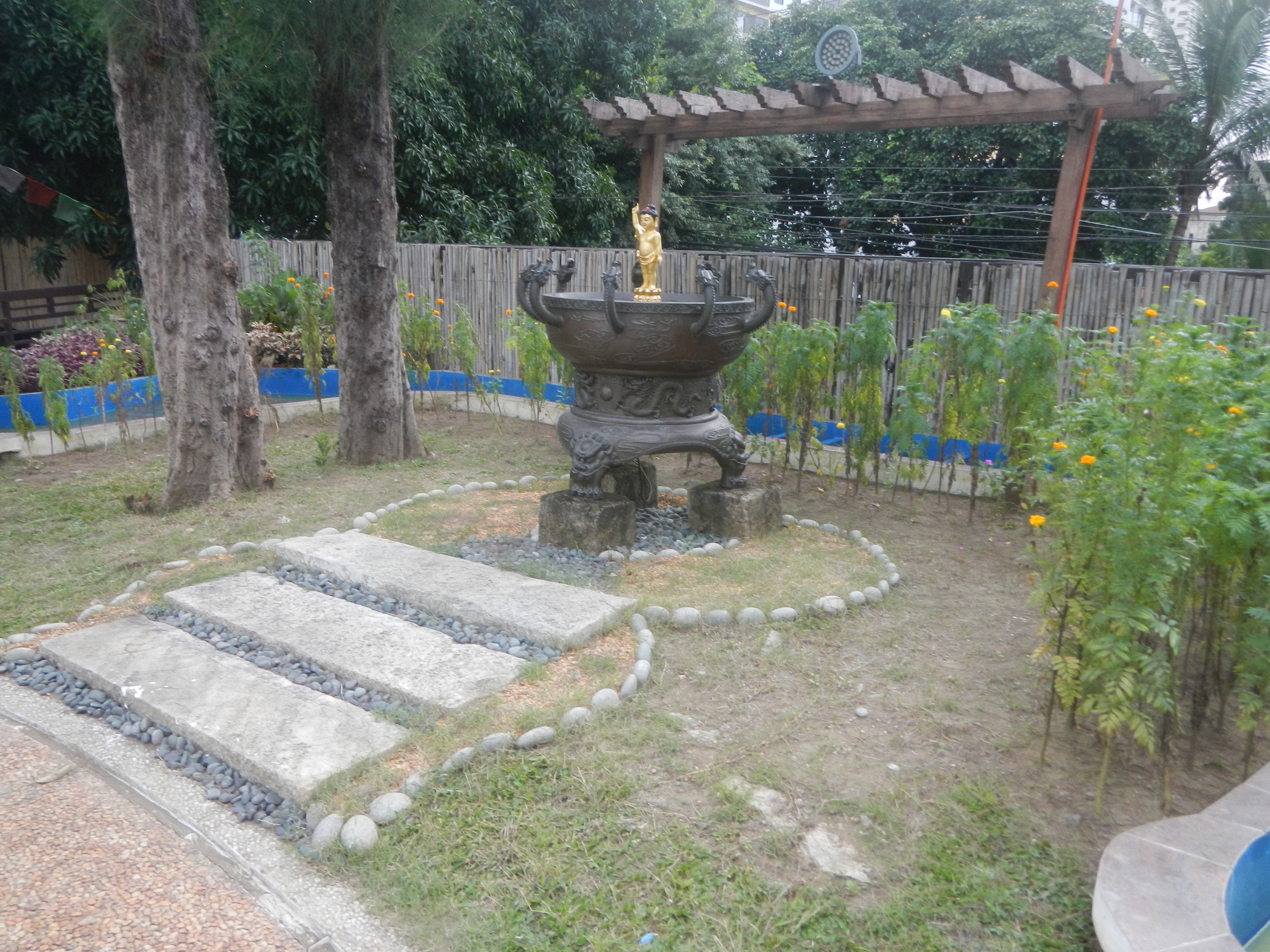
Wisdom Park, a Buddhist park and religious resource center located along Broadway Avenue.

- Basilica of the National Shrine of Our Lady of Mount Carmel
- Jubilee Evangelical Church
- Mariana Park
- Quezon City Reception House
- St. Joseph Convent of Perpetual Adoration (Pink Sisters Convent)
- Wisdom Park
- Our Lady of Victories Church (of the SSPX, Cannon cor. Betty-Go-Belmonte Streets)

== Transport ==
=== Roads and streets ===
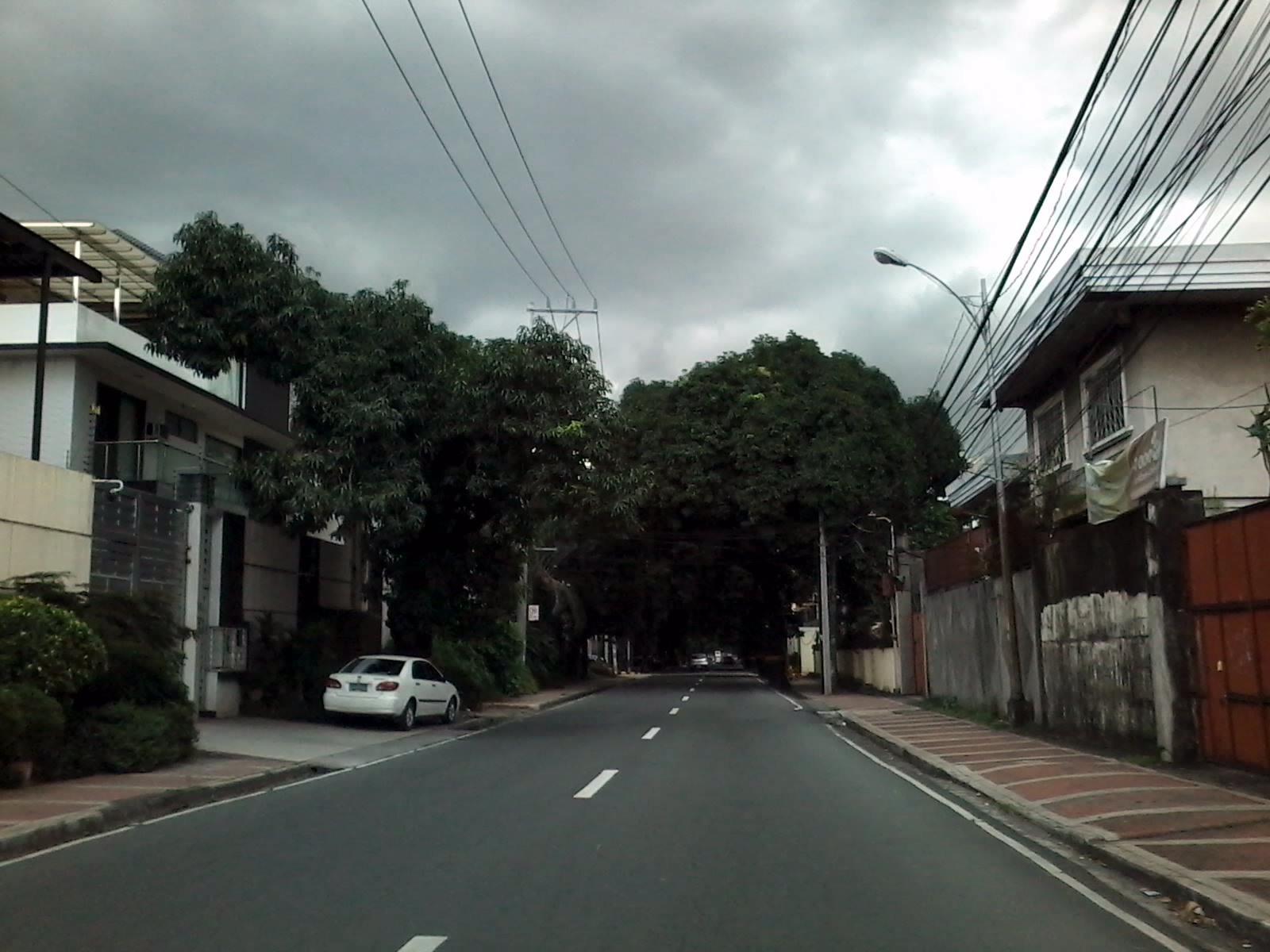
Rows of mango trees planted along Gilmore Avenue, the area's main southbound thoroughfare.

Mariana has a grid road layout, with its latitudinal roads named numerically from 1st to 13th, and its longitudinal roads serving as main thoroughfares. Victoria Avenue (named after Doña Hemady's daughter-in-law, Victoria Cortes Ysmael), Broadway Avenue, Gilmore Avenue, Doña Hemady Avenue (formerly named Pacific Avenue), and Balete Drive serve as north–south thoroughfares within the area, while Eulogio Rodriguez Sr. Avenue and Aurora Boulevard serves as outlying east–west thoroughfares.

All roads in the barangay are two-lane roads. Victoria Avenue, Broadway Avenue, and Balete Drive run in a two-way direction while Gilmore Avenue runs in a one-way direction going south, and Doña Hemady Avenue runs in a one-way direction going north.

=== Bus routes ===
Bus Route 3 (Antipolo - Quiapo via Aurora Boulevard) serves the southern perimeter of the barangay along Aurora Boulevard, with stops at Betty Go-Belmonte Street, Robinsons Magnolia, Gilmore Avenue, and Madison Street. Jeepneys run along E. Rodriguez Sr. Avenue with routes going to and from Manila, Araneta City, and the Project 2 & 3 area.

The area is also served by two routes of the Quezon City Bus Service. Route 3 passes through E. Rodriguez Sr. Avenue with stops at the St. Lukes Medical Center and Gilmore Avenue, while Route 6 passes through Gilmore Avenue with stops at E. Rodriguez Sr. Avenue, 1st Street, and Robinsons Magnolia along Doña Hemady Avenue.

=== Jeepney routes ===
Jeepneys pass through Aurora Boulevard to and from the Cubao district and Stop & Shop (a name for the area of Old Santa Mesa Road in Santa Mesa, Manila).

- Parang Stop & Shop - Cubao (T285)

=== Tricycle terminals ===
Tricycles ply the New Manila area directly through New Manila Tricycle Operators and Drivers' Association (TODA) terminals located at Madison Street, 3rd Street corner Gilmore Avenue, and Victoria Avenue corner E. Rodriguez Sr. Avenue.

=== Elevated railway ===
Mariana is served by Gilmore Station and Betty Go-Belmonte Station of the LRT Line 2.

== Government ==
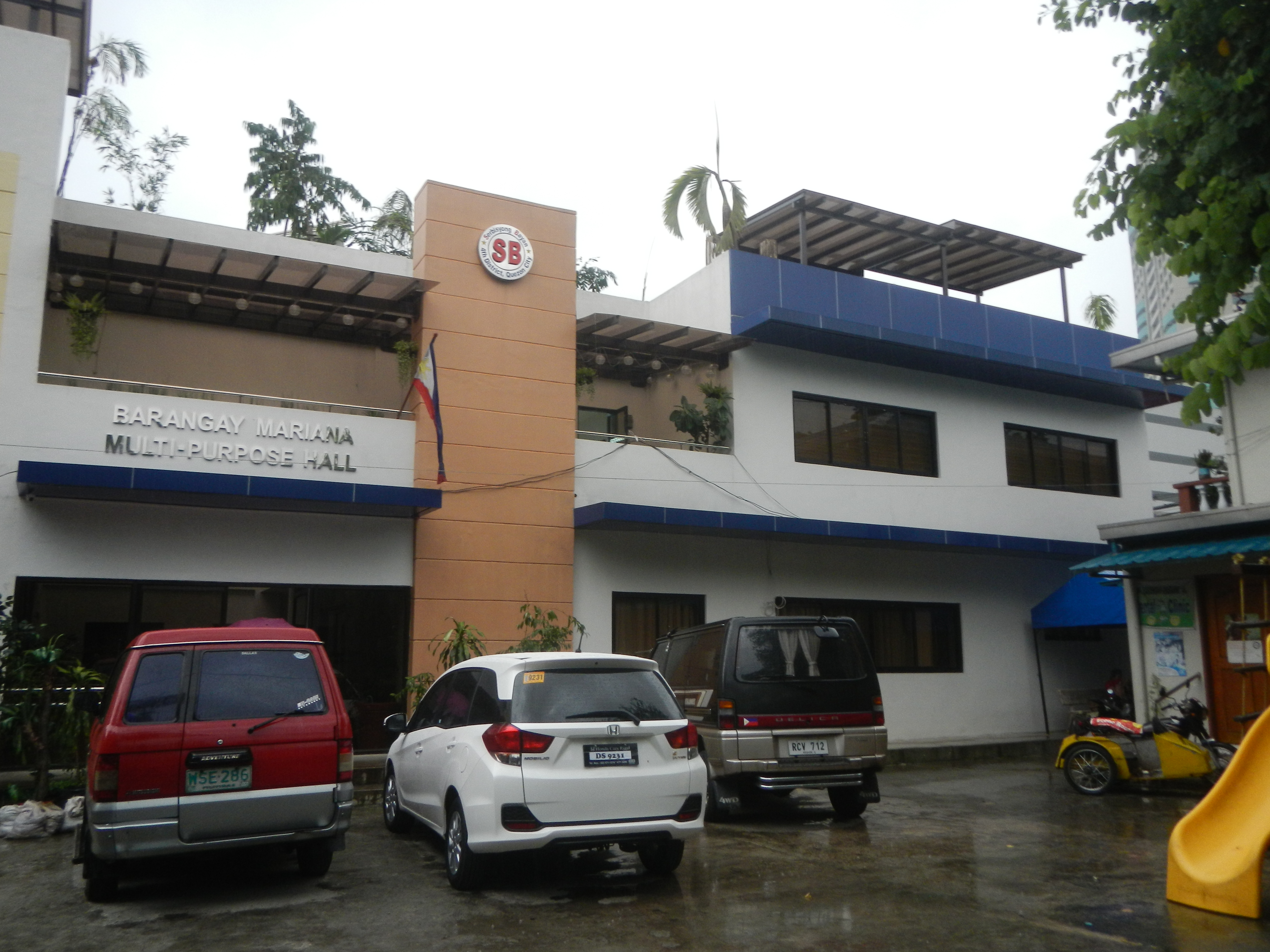
The exterior of the barangay hall.

The seat of government of Mariana is located at 4th Street corner New Jersey Street, a compound which also includes the barangay's multi-purpose facilities and materials recovery facility.

== Demographics ==
Barangay Mariana is the 56th most-populated barangay in Quezon City, with a population of 11,967 people according to the 2020 census, up from a population of 11,227 people in the 2015 census.

The insignia of the barangay seal is a green mango, owing to the prominence of mango trees planted along Gilmore Avenue and Broadway Avenue that were originally planted by Doña Hemady and her laborers.

== Notable historic residents ==
Notable historic residents included various artists, celebrities, and politicians, among others.

- Amalia Fuentes
- Butz Aquino
- Jose W. Diokno
- Cecilia Muñoz-Palma
- Charito Solis
- Danding Cojuangco
- Emmanuel Pelaez
- Eulogio Rodriguez
- Fe Sarmiento-Panlilo
- Felix Manalo
- Gloria Romero
- Jamby Madrigal
- Jose L. Lerma
- Lorenzo Tañada
- Magnolia Antonino
- Manuel L. Quezon
- Manuel V. Gallego
- Maria Kalaw Katigbak
- Narcisa de León
- Ninoy Aquino
- Pacita Madrigal-Warns
- Pilita Corrales
- Quintín Paredes
- Rafael Alunan III
- Soc Rodrigo
- Teofisto Guingona Jr.
- Vicente Madrigal
