= Vanishing hitchhiker =

Urban legend

The vanishing hitchhiker (or variations such as the ghostly hitchhiker, disappearing hitchhiker, or phantom hitchhiker) is an urban legend in which people travelling by vehicle meet with or are accompanied by a hitchhiker, who subsequently vanishes without explanation, often from a moving vehicle.

Public knowledge of the story expanded greatly with the 1981 publication of Jan Harold Brunvand's nonfiction book The Vanishing Hitchhiker. In his book, Brunvand suggests that the story of The Vanishing Hitchhiker can be traced as far back as the 1870s." Similar stories have been reported for centuries across the world in places like England, Ethiopia, Korea, France, South Africa, Tsarist Russia and in America among Chinese Americans, Mormons and Ozark mountaineers.

What was probably the first vanishing hitchhiker legend can be found in the 400-year-old manuscript Om the tekn och widunder som föregingo thet liturgiske owäsendet, which translates roughly as "About the signs and wonders that preceded the liturgical event". The author was Joen Petri Klint, a priest in diocese of Linköping, Sweden, and diligent collector of omens.

== Variations ==
A common variation of the above involves the vanishing hitchhiker departing as would a normal passenger, having left some item in the vehicle, or having borrowed a garment for protection against the cold. The vanishing hitchhiker may also leave some form of information that encourages the motorist to make subsequent contact.

In such accounts of the legend, the garment borrowed is often found draped over a gravestone in a local cemetery. In this and other versions of the urban legend, the unsuspecting motorist makes contact with the family of a deceased person using the information the hitchhiker left behind, and finds that the family's description of the deceased matches the passenger the motorist picked up, and also finds that they were killed in some unexpected way (usually a car accident) and that the driver's encounter with the vanishing hitchhiker occurred on the anniversary of their death.

Other variations reverse this scenario, in that the hitchhiker meets a driver; the hitchhiker later learns that the driver is actually an apparition of a person who died earlier. The song "Phantom 309" is an example.

Not all vanishing-hitchhiker legends involve ghosts. One popular variant in Hawaii involves the goddess Pele, travelling the roads incognito and rewarding kind travelers; other variants include hitchhikers who utter prophecies (typically of pending catastrophes or other evil events) before vanishing.

A similar story has two travelers sitting next to each other on a train (normally a man and a woman). One of them is reading a book and the other person asks what the book is about, and the first person says that it is about ghosts. They then have a conversation about ghosts, and the second person asks the first if the latter believes in ghosts or has ever seen one, to which the first person claims never to have seen or believed in ghosts at all. The second person replies that this is doubtful, and vanishes. This was the version used in the Scary Stories to Tell in the Dark book series.

== Classifications ==
=== Beardsley and Hankey ===
The first proper study of the story of the vanishing hitchhiker was undertaken in 1942–43 by American folklorists Richard Beardsley and Rosalie Hankey, who collected as many accounts as they could and attempted to analyze them.

The Beardsley-Hankey survey elicited 79 written accounts of encounters with vanishing hitchhikers, drawn from across the United States. They found: "Four distinctly different versions, distinguishable because of obvious differences in development and essence." These are described as:

1. Stories where the hitchhiker gives an address through which the motorist learns he has just given a lift to a ghost; 49 of the Beardsley-Hankey samples fell into this category, with responses from 16 states of the United States.
2. Stories where the hitchhiker is an old woman who prophesies disaster or the end of World War II; subsequent inquiries likewise reveal her to be deceased. Nine of the samples fit this description, and eight of these came from the vicinity of Chicago. Beardsley and Hankey felt that this indicated a local origin, which they dated to around 1933; two of hitchhikers in this sample foretold disaster at the Century of Progress Exposition and another foresaw calamity "at the World's Fair". The strict topicality of these unsuccessful forecasts did not appear to thwart the appearance of further hitchhikers from this version, one of whom warned that Northerly Island, in Lake Michigan, would soon be submerged (this has not yet occurred).
3. Stories where a girl is met at some place of entertainment, e.g., dance, instead of on the road; she leaves some token (often the overcoat she borrowed from the motorist) on her grave by way of corroborating the experience and her identity. The uniformity among separate accounts of this variant led Beardsley and Hankey to strongly doubt its folkloric authenticity.
4. Stories where the hitchhiker is later identified as a local divinity.

Beardsley and Hankey were particularly interested to note one instance (location: Kingston, New York, 1941) in which the vanishing hitchhiker was subsequently identified as the late Mother Cabrini, founder of the local Sacred Heart Orphanage, who was beatified for her work. The authors felt that this was a case of version two glimpsed in transition to version four. Beardsley and Hankey concluded that version one was closest to the original form of the story, containing the essential elements of the legend. Versions two and four, they believed, were localized variations, while three was supposed to have started life as a separate ghost story, which at some stage became conflated with the original vanishing hitchhiker story (version two). One of their conclusions certainly seems reflected in the continuation of vanishing hitchhiker stories: The hitchhiker is, in the majority of cases, female and the lift-giver male. Beardsley and Hankey's sample contained 47 young female apparitions, 14 old lady apparitions, and 14 more of an indeterminate sort.

=== Baughman ===
Ernest W. Baughman's Type- and Motif-Index of the Folk Tales of England and North America (1966) delineates the basic vanishing hitchhiker as:

Ghost of young woman asks for ride in automobile, disappears from closed car without the driver's knowledge, after giving him an address to which she wishes to be taken. The driver asks person at the address about the rider, finds she has been dead for some time. (Often, the driver finds that the ghost has made similar attempts to return, usually on the anniversary of death in an automobile accident. Often, too, the ghost leaves some item such as a scarf or traveling bag in the car.)

Baughman's classification system grades this basic story as motif E332.3.3.1.

Subcategories include:

- E332.3.3.1(a) for vanishing hitchhikers who reappear on anniversaries
- E332.3.3.1(b) for vanishing hitchhikers who leave items in vehicles, unless the item is in a pool of water, in which case it is E332.3.3.1(c)
- E332.3.3.1(d) is for accounts of sinister old ladies who prophesy disasters
- E332.3.3.1(e) contains accounts of phantoms who are apparently sufficiently solid to engage in activities such as eating or drinking during their journey
- E332.3.3.1(f) is for phantom parents who want to be taken to the sickbed of their dying son
- E332.3.3.1(g) is for hitchhikers simply requesting a lift home
- E332.3.3.1(h-j) are a category reserved exclusively for vanishing nuns (a surprisingly common variant), some of whom foretell the future

Here, the phenomenon blends into religious encounters, with the next and last vanishing hitchhiker classification – E332.3.3.2 – being for encounters with divinities who take to the road as hitchhikers. The legend of Saint Christopher is considered one of these, and the story of Philip the Evangelist being transported by God after encountering the Ethiopian on the road (Acts 8:26–39) is sometimes similarly interpreted.

== The first vanishing hitchhiker legend ==
The author was Joen Petri Klint, a priest in diocese of Linköping, Sweden, and diligent collector of omens.

In February 1602, a priest and two farmers were on their way home from the Candelmass market in Västergötland. A maid asked to go along. At an inn, they got off to get a bite to eat, and the maid wanted something to drink, a jug of beer (a common beverage). The first time the innkeeper fetched beer, the jug was filled with malt, the second time was acorns, and finally blood. They were then horrified. The maid explained that this year will yield much grain, plenty of fruit on the trees, but war and pestilence. Then she disappeared into thin air.

The incident contains all the hallmarks of a "vanishing hitchhiker". It fits well with Beardsley and Hankey's second and third categories (when the hitchhiker disappeared after making a prediction). The beer's transformations match Baughman's category E332.3.3.1(b), when the maid left behind seed, acorns, and blood, and category E332.3.3.1(d) when she predicted the future (however, Klint does not mention whether the prophecy was correct), as well as category E332.3.3.1(e), because she wanted something to drink, and E332.3.3.1(g), because she was on her way home.

== Skeptical reception ==
Paranormal researcher Michael Goss in his book The Evidence for Phantom Hitch-Hikers [sic] discovered that many reports of vanishing hitchhikers turn out be based on folklore and hearsay stories. Goss also examined some cases and attributed them to hallucinations of the experiencer. According to Goss, most of the stories are "fabricated, folklore creations retold in new settings."

Skeptic Joe Nickell, who investigated two alleged cases, concluded that no reliable evidence exists for vanishing hitchhikers. Historical examples have their origin in folklore tales and urban legends. Modern cases often involve conflicting accounts that may well be the result of exaggeration, illusion, or hoaxes.

== See also ==
- A229 road, scene of the "Phantom Hitch-Hiker" stories where the road passes the Lower Bell pub at Blue Bell Hill
- Belchen Tunnel (the "white woman" of the Belchen Tunnel, Switzerland)
- Haunted highway
- Highway hypnosis
- "Laurie (Strange Things Happen)"
- Niles Canyon ghost
- Madam Koi Koi
- Pee-Wee's Big Adventure (Large Marge)
- Raymond Robinson (Green Man)
- Resurrection Mary
- Sayona
- Shipley Hollow Road
- The Hitch-Hiker, a radio play in which a driver continually encounters a mysterious hitchhiker; later adapted into a Twilight Zone episode
- The Hitcher (1986 film)
- The Suffolk Miracle, a legend along similar lines
- Lady of White Rock Lake
