= List of reportedly haunted highways =

Roads with rumors and reports of apparitions and ghosts

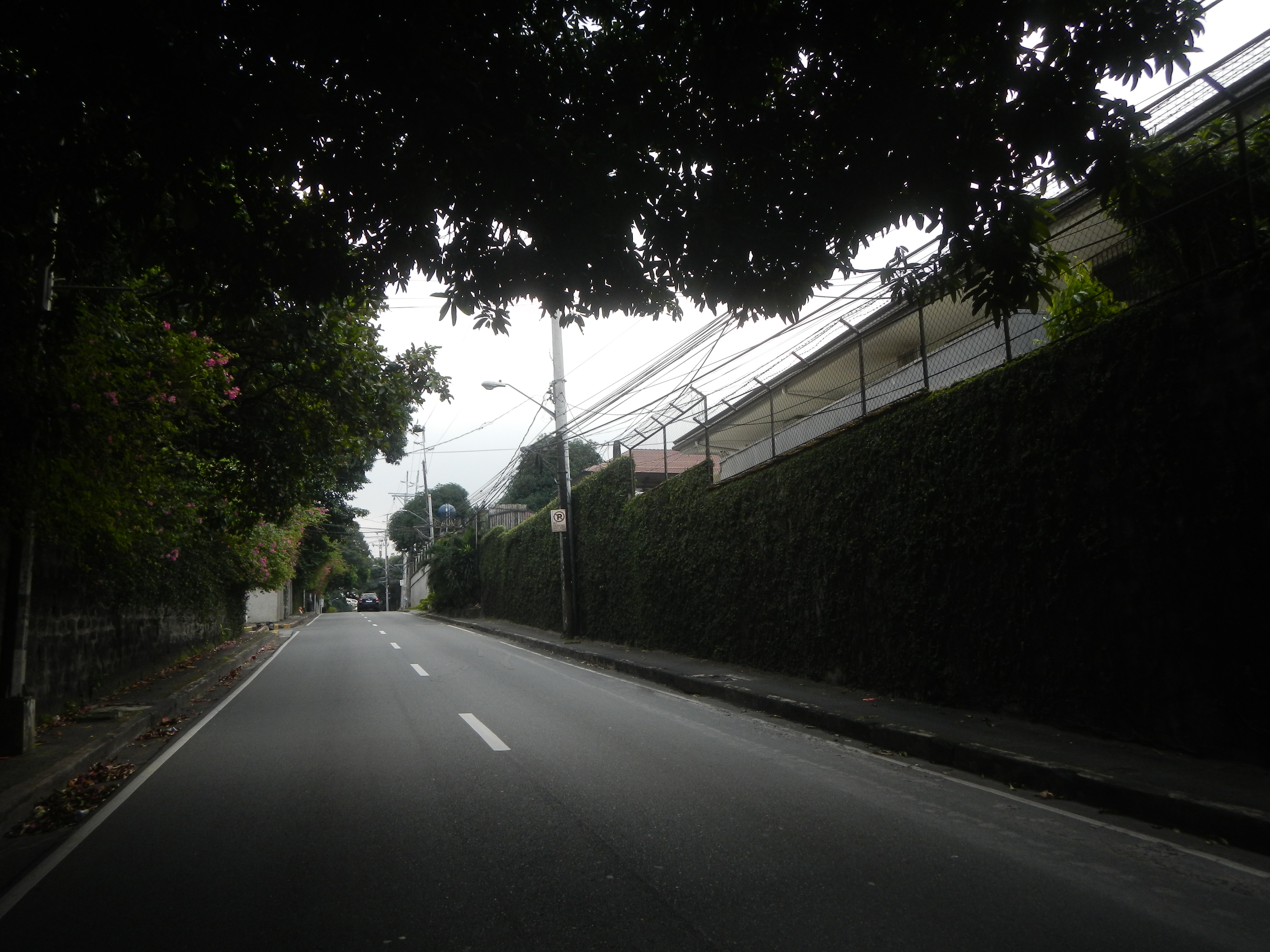
Balete Drive, a residential street in Quezon City, Philippines, is claimed by believers to be haunted by a white lady, said to be the ghost of a teenager who died in the 1950s, either by an automobile crash or by rape from a taxicab driver.

Haunted highways or roads are streets, roads or highways which are the subject of folklore and urban legends, including rumors and reports of ghostly apparitions, ghostly figures, phantom hitchhikers, phantom vehicles, repeating or looping highways, or other paranormal phenomena.

== Legends ==
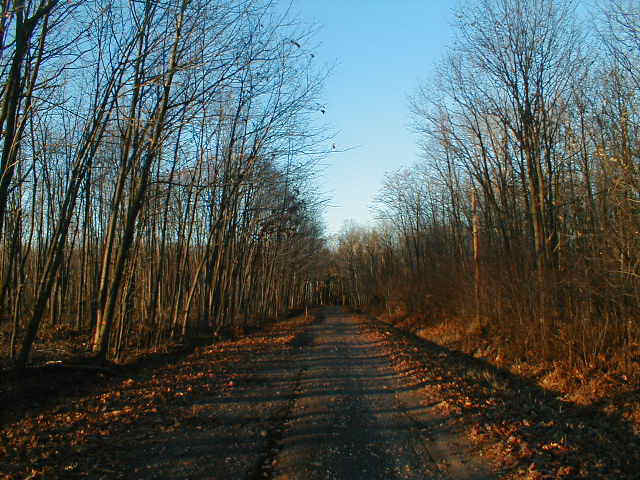
Boy Scout Lane, a rural road in Stevens Point, Wisconsin, is associated with numerous stories of paranormal activity, including the supposed deaths of a Boy Scouts of America troop.

=== United States ===
- 22 Mine Road, Holden, West Virginia: 22 Mine Road is reportedly haunted by the ghost of Mamie Thurman, who was found murdered and dumped along the road on June 22, 1932.
- Annie's Road, Totowa, New Jersey: Annie's Road in New Jersey is supposedly haunted by the ghost of a woman killed on the road many years ago. It is located in Totowa on the first half of Riverview Drive.
- Suscon Road, Pittston Township, Pennsylvania: Suscon Road is long state route that goes on for miles and turns into Thornhurst Road and Bear Lake Road. Many say they could hear bloodcurdling screams in the woods and see a non moving bright light in the street. Sometimes people even see a young woman dressed in a white dress appear. These even typically take place by "the black bridge", an old railroad bridge that was demolished in the 1980s. Even though the bridge was demolished people could still hear and see things. According to legend, either a young bride hanged herself nearby after being married or a girl was killed after her prom night on the road. This is probably why the young woman allegedly is seen wearing white to this day. The girl is often called the "Suscon Screamer" and many say if you honk the horn of your car three times at night in the area of the old railroad bridge, you could hear the screams of the Screamer and might even catch a glimpse of her. One other legend is that there is a strange breed of animal that lives in the woods that sounds like a girl screaming when it howls. Some say the creature has a long square snout and walks with a hunch in its back, others say it looks like a hyena.
- Boy Scout Lane, Wisconsin: a dead-end road with no outlet. A number of ghost stories and urban legends have become associated with the road, including the fictional deaths of a troop of Boy Scouts. The area has been the subject of several paranormal investigations, and has been a 'haunt' for local youths. However, there are no records of fatalities or mysterious disappearances on or around Boy Scout Lane.
- Bray Road Elkhorn, Wisconsin is infamously known for being the home of the Beast of Bray Road.
- Clinton Road in West Milford, Passaic County, New Jersey: the subject of local folklore that includes alleged sightings of ghosts, strange creatures and gatherings of witches, Satanists and the Ku Klux Klan. Supposedly, if a person visits one of the bridges at the reservoir and throws a penny into the water, within a minute it will be thrown back out to by the ghost of a boy who drowned while swimming below or had fallen in while sitting on the edge of the bridge. In some tellings an apparition is seen; in others the ghost pushes the teller into the water if he or she looks over the side of the bridge in order to save him.
- The Devil's Washbowl road in Moretown, Vermont is connected to a tale of pig-human hybrid entity known as the "Pigman".
- Edmonds Road, Jeremy Swamp Road, Marginal Road, Saw Mill City Road, Velvet Street, and Zion Hill Road, Connecticut: these Connecticut roads are connected to legends of Melon Heads, Saw Mill and Velvet are commonly referred to by residents as "Dracula Drive".
- Jamestown Road, Jamestown, Guilford County, North Carolina: this road is the subject of local folklore regarding a vanishing hitchhiker known as "Lydia".
- Mount Misery Road and Sweet Hollow Road, West Hills, New York, Huntington, New York: these two roads are both subjects of local folklore, including but not limited to tales of Mary's Grave (supposedly located on a cemetery on Sweet Hollow Road), a ghostly police officer with the back of his head missing, and ghosts from a burned down mental asylum.
- Shades of Death Road, Warren County, New Jersey: this unusually-named road is associated with ghosts and supernatural activity, as is Ghost Lake in the vicinity.

=== United Kingdom ===
- Flash Lane, Darley Moor: the quiet country lane near Darley Dale in Derbyshire is reputedly haunted by a headless horseman who was seen in the 1990s, along with supposed sightings of UFOs and 'Black Panthers' in the area. The nearby Darley Road is the location of several UFO sightings. It is reported that locals are afraid to use the road.
- Harewood Road, Holymoorside: the three mile lane linking Beeley Moor with the Derbyshire village of Holymoorside is reported to be haunted by phantom monks. Monks would be sent over from Beauchief Abbey to Harewood Grange, to work on the land, as a punishment for misbehaving. An uncomfortable atmosphere has also been reported in the area around the entrance to the abandoned Hunger Hill Pumping Station.
- A11 Thetford Bypass: the A11 dual carriageway Thetford bypass is reputedly haunted by a phantom gamekeeper appearing on car bonnets. Whilst waiting at a traffic light, one driver witnessed a car from the 1930s pass and vanish. The road has been known to unsettle passengers and drivers, creating a sense of lethargy.
- A21 Sevenoaks Bypass: the A21 Sevenoaks Bypass is reputedly haunted by ghostly sliproads which lead drivers into oncoming traffic and ultimately their deaths.
- A22 Caterham Bypass: on a certain section of the Caterham bypass, spectral females have been seen in the carriageway and crossing the road.
- A23: the A23 road between Brighton and Crawley
- A229 in Kent, between the M20 and M2: near Burham on the A229 road, on the 19 November 1965, three women were severely injured in a road crash at Blue Bell Hill
- A38 road, Somerset: according to legend, phantom hitchhikers have been reported since the 1950s on the A38 road between Wellington and Taunton in Somerset. One tale holds that in 1958 a lorry driver named "Harry (or "Harold" in some tellings) Unsworth" saw a hitchhiker he had given a ride to earlier re-appear miles down the road from where he had dropped him off.
- A61 Unstone-Dronfield Bypass: cars heading Northbound past Monk Wood are known to suddenly veer off down an embankment just a few feet before the crash barrier starts. The bypass is also believed to be haunted as a result of horrific fatal injuries sustained in crashes.
- A616 Stockbridge Bypass: the A616 road connects Manchester, to the M1 motorway. The section North of Sheffield is known as the Stocksbridge Bypass. During the bypass's construction, security staff allegedly reported encounters with phantom children dancing around an electricity pylon and a ghostly monk standing on Pea Royd Bridge who was believed to have been from the Hunshelf Priory.
- A75 road, Scotland: the A75, a major road in Scotland from Annan to Gretna Green, has been called Scotland's "most haunted road" by some authors. According to one story, in 1957 a truck driver swerved to avoid a couple walking in the road but when he stopped to investigate the pair had "vanished". Other versions of the stories tell of a couple or group of friends driving down the road at night and are constantly plagued and harassed by shadow figures, from an elderly woman to the back end of a semi truck that they nearly hit before braking only for it to disappear.

=== Europe ===
- A3 motorway, Croatia: the section of A3 motorway in Croatia between Staro Petrovo Selo and Nova Gradiška is believed to be haunted due to high number of crashes and paranormal encounters. It is a section where singer Toše Proeski and actress Dolores Lambaša died.
- Belchen Tunnel, Switzerland: sightings of an old woman dressed all in white who supposedly haunts the tunnel.

=== Asia ===
- E8 Expressway, Malaysia: the E8 Expressway, also known as the Kuala Lumpur–Karak Expressway, is reportedly "one of the most haunted highways in the world". It is claimed that many people driving late at night see strange creatures, lost schoolboy, and Pontianak on this road. There is also sightings of a driverless yellow Volkswagen Beetle that appears from nowhere, that makes other drivers follow it to death.
- Chak Phra Road, Thailand is a narrow, two-lane road that runs alongside the Khlong Chak Phra canal on the Thonburi side of Bangkok. It is the subject of an urban legend dating back to the late 1970s about the ghost of a pregnant woman known as "Phi Yai Wan", or the ghost of Miss Wan. According to the story, she was a local woman who was murdered by her husband. Her spirit is believed to haunt the area in various disturbing ways, particularly in front of Wat Taling Chan temple, which Chak Phra Road passes through. Many drivers, including taxi and tuk-tuk drivers, reportedly avoid the road after sunset out of fear of encountering her ghost.
- Rama IX Road, Thailand: in 2016, a video by Thai journalist Powarit Katkul of a "ghost" on Rama IX Road in Bangkok went viral on social media.
- Ratchadapisek Road, Thailand: Ratchadapisek Road is an inner-city ring road in downtown Bangkok. A curved section in front of the Criminal Court is often referred to as the "Hundred-Death Curve" due to the frequent fatal crashes that occur there. Poor visibility caused by a sacred fig tree growing on the median strip is believed to contribute to these crashes. In response, locals often place flower garlands and zebra statues along the curve and up to the nearby footbridge to pay homage to the souls of the deceased. It is also common for drivers to honk their horns while passing through this curve as a symbolic gesture, asking the spirits of those who died there for safe passage.
- Ratchaprasong, Thailand: Located at the four-corner junction of Ratchadamri, Rama I, and Ploenchit Roads in downtown Bangkok, Ratchaprasong Intersection is surrounded by a bustling shopping and commercial district. The intersection sits on the former site of a royal residence known as Phetchabun Palace. It is believed by some that this location is cursed, as it lies in the shadow of the massive CentralWorld complex. Several shrines have been built in the area to appease restless spirits and negative energies. The most famous and oldest among them is the Erawan Shrine, dedicated to Phra Phrom, the Thai representation of the Hindu four-faced deity, Brahma. When the Erawan Hotel first opened at the corner of the intersection, guests reportedly saw apparitions, fueling the belief that the location was spiritually unsuitable. According to ancient Thai beliefs, major intersections can be passageways for spirits. Fortune tellers and spiritual practitioners have linked several tragic events to these supernatural forces, including the Great CentralWorld Fire in 2010, the deadly bombing in 2015, and a pattern of frequent traffic violence. Many believe these incidents are the result of spirits still lingering in the area.
- Soi Vacharaphol, Thailand: A side street branching from Ram Inthra Road in Bang Khen, a northern suburb of Bangkok. It is a deep and secluded road. Around 1992, the area was surrounded by empty fields and many abandoned houses, making it prone to frequent crimes. There is a story about a European-style house said to be haunted, as well as an abandoned housing project named Piyaporn Village, which covers more than 39.5 acres (16.0 ha). It is believed to have been built on the site of an old graveyard. Because of this, the construction was reportedly unsuccessful due to ghostly disturbances, and the area became known as a haunt for spirits. This street is often crowded with teenagers coming to hunt for ghosts.
- Tha Chaom–Nong Chang Road, Uthai Thani, Thailand: A rural road reported to be haunted, with locals and monks claiming sightings of a headless male ghost and a preta. In June 2020, a couple reported being chased for 3 km (1.9 mi) by a ghostly woman with a protruding tongue.
- Tuen Mun Road, Hong Kong: the Tuen Mun Road, one of Hong Kong's major expressways, is said by believers to be haunted. Many car crashes have been blamed by locals to the ghosts that suddenly appear along the middle of the expressway. Although authorities have cited narrow carriageways and substandard geometry (to save construction costs) as the reasons for these crashes, speed limits have been enforced for the expressway.
- Casablanca Tunnel, Indonesia: an underpass located in South Jakarta, Indonesia is one of the most reportedly haunted tunnels in the country and has become a famous urban legend among locals. During its construction, the site was once a Dutch colonial graveyard and the government has to divide Ereveld Menteng Pulo when the road was constructed. There are reported sightings of a pontianak who was raped and killed before the underpass was constructed. Passerby are usually advised to sound the horn at night to avoid any unwanted incident.
- Bei Yi Highway, Taiwan: part of Provincial highway no. 9, Bei Yi Highway connects Taipei and Yilan County. The highway used to be a fatal road in Taiwan due to bad road conditions. Much ghost money (joss money) along the highway was a common sight in the past. The ghost money was scattered on the highway to appease the spirits. Recently, the highway has become the most popular heavy motorcycle route in Taipei, and the number of fatal crashes continues to increase.
- NH 4, India NH 4 is believed to be reported one of the most scariest highways. A girl believed to want a lift from a driver and disappears and reappears and can start to laugh .
- Dhaka Airport Road, Dhaka It is haunted by a lady at nighttime car crashes can be frequent.

=== Africa ===
- N9 road, South Africa: the road between Uniondale and Willowmore, in the semi-desert area of the Karoo, is the subject of a story of the "Uniondale Phantom Hitchhiker", a girl named "Marie Charlotte Roux" who allegedly died in a road crash on a particular stretch of the N9 on April 12, 1968 (Good Friday).

=== Australia ===
- Wakehurst Parkway, in Sydney, Australia is believed to be haunted by the ghost of a young woman named Kelly, and is said to be able to take control of vehicles that drive along the road at night. Crashes have also occurred along Wakehurst Parkway in recent years.

== See also ==
- List of ghosts
