= Lower Bell =

Pub in Kent, England

Coordinates: 51°19′05″N 00°30′28″E

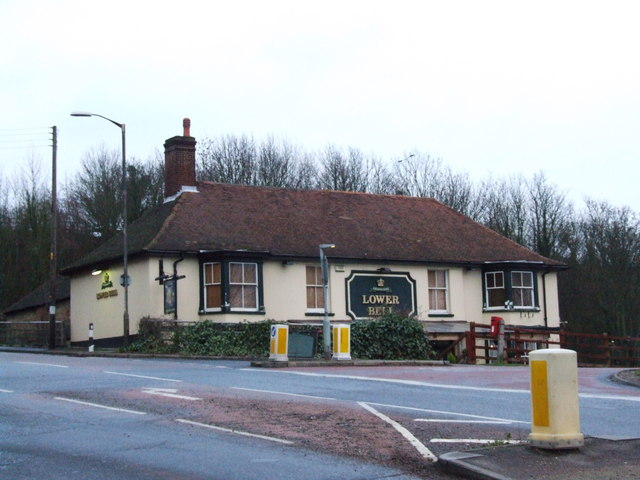
The Lower Bell in 2008

The Lower Bell is a pub and hotel on the A229 Blue Bell Hill, between Chatham and Maidstone in Kent. It is located at the edge of the North Downs where the A229 meets the Pilgrims' Way.

A pub has existed in the general area since around 1790, when the A229 was a turnpike road for coaches. The map maker and artist Paul Sandby painted A Distant View of Maidstone, from Lower Bell Inn, Boxley Hill in 1802, which depicts a view of the town from the pub. It is marked at its current location on a large-scale 1832 map of Kent. The current building was constructed in 1865.

The purpose of the bell was for travellers to warn others further up the hill of their presence, as the road was too narrow for two teams of coach and horses to pass each other. There was a corresponding pub at the top of the hill called The Upper Bell, which would ring in response. The Upper Bell was demolished in 2013.

The Lower Bell is cited as a location for a common ghost story, which originates from a fatal car accident involving a bride-to-be on the A229 outside the premises in November 1965. The typical story involves the apparition of a young woman attempting to hitch a lift outside the pub into the centre of Maidstone or another local village, who subsequently vanishes en route. A local journalist attempted to verify the story for the Maidstone Gazette in 1968, but was unable to find any suitable eyewitnesses after months of research. In 2015, on the fiftieth anniversary of the accident, a paranormal enthusiasts' group met in the Lower Bell to discuss the various ghost stories. A short film, entitled The Ghost of Blue Bell Hill, was shot around the premises.
