= Niles Canyon ghost =

Urban legend from California

Coordinates: 37.581°N 121.965°W

The Niles Canyon ghost is an urban legend within the vanishing hitchhiker archetype, about the ghost of a girl who had died in a car accident. The accident is said to have taken place on February 28, with the year varying, and the ghost is said to walk the road on that day every year, looking to hitch a ride to San Francisco.

One variation of the story has the hiker's backstory being that she died in a car crash on Niles Canyon road (part of California State Route 84, off the 680 freeway in Sunol, California) on the way back from a dance. Some say that she can be seen at midnight waiting at the corner where she died. People traveling along the road (mostly those traveling alone) are said to have stopped and offered the girl a ride. She accepts the ride, giving the driver an address across the bridge (either Dumbarton or Bay Bridge, depending on the storyteller). Once the driver reaches the beginning of the bridge, the girl disappears. In stories told of the ghost, a driver who visits the girl's address is told by the girl's mother that she died many years previously.

Another version of the story has the ghost described as a White Lady killed in a carriage accident a hundred years previously.
