= Gilmore Avenue (Quezon City) =

Road in Quezon City, Philippines

Coordinates: 14°37′3″N 121°1′56″E

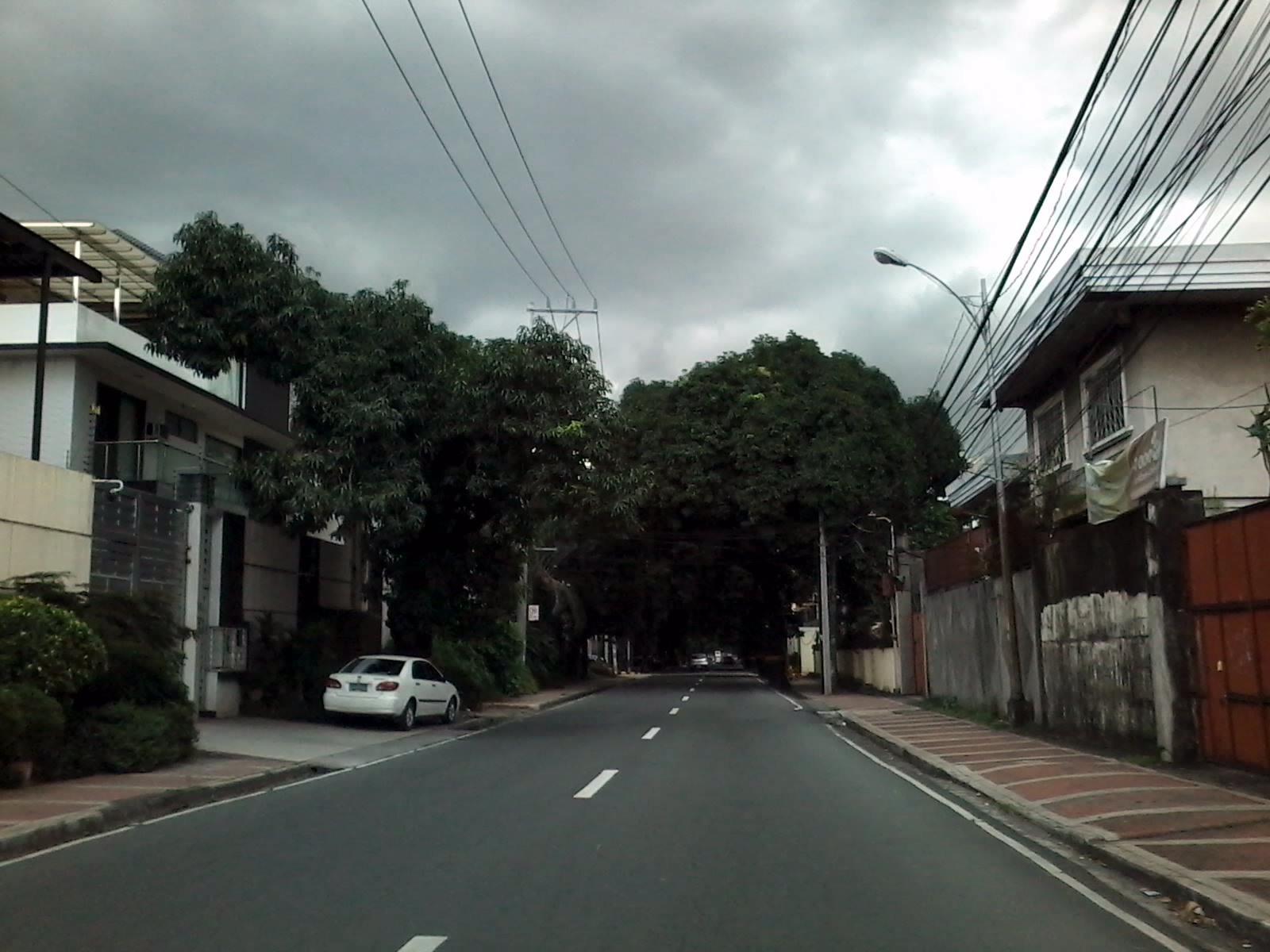
- Gilmore Avenue, looking south from its intersection with 12th Street
- Interactive map of Gilmore Avenue
- Former names: Governor Gilmore Street; Gilmore Street
- Namesake: Eugene Allen Gilmore
- Maintained by: Department of Public Works and Highways
- Length: 1.476 km (0.917 mi)
- Component highways: N184 from Aurora Boulevard to N. Domingo Street
- Location: Quezon City
- North end: Eulogio Rodriguez Sr. Avenue
- Major junctions: N180 (Aurora Boulevard)
- South end: N. Domingo Street; Granada Street

Other
- Known for: Computer retail

Gilmore Avenue, formerly known as Gilmore Street, is a two-lane, one-way road in Quezon City, Metro Manila, Philippines. It runs one-way from Eulogio Rodriguez Sr. Avenue in New Manila and terminates at N. Domingo Street in Valencia. It continues as the two-way Granada Street until it reaches the city border with San Juan, where it becomes Ortigas Avenue.

The road is named for Eugene Allen Gilmore, Vice Governor-General of the Philippines from 1922 to 1929, who twice served as acting Governor-General. The road is well known as a major IT hub for the number of computer retail shops at its intersection with Aurora Boulevard.

== History ==
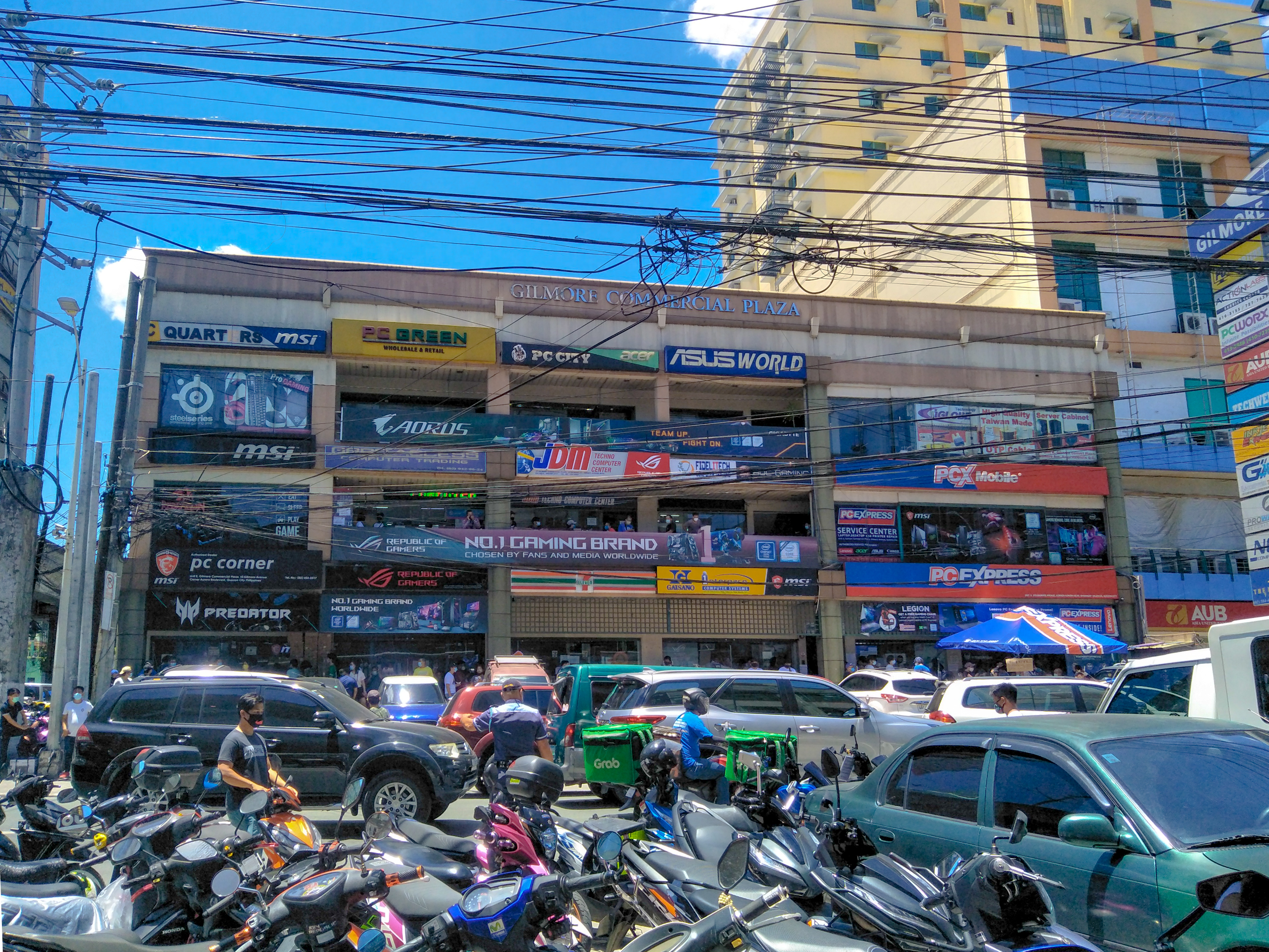
Several computer shops located at the corner of Gilmore Avenue and Aurora Boulevard

Gilmore Avenue was originally named and constructed sometime before 1943 as Governor Gilmore Street, serving as one of four north–south thoroughfares for the New Manila Subdivisions established a few decades prior. It served as a one-way southbound counterpart to the one-way northbound Pacific Avenue (now Doña Hemady Avenue), which was originally named as a reference to America's successful acquisition of the Pacific Rim islands that included the Philippines during the Spanish–American War in 1898.

In the 1960s and 1970s, south of the New Manila area, new subdivisions and a shopping center were being developed in what would become the Greenhills area in the municipality of San Juan del Monte, Rizal (now San Juan, Metro Manila). The road became known as a passageway for motorists to Greenhills and Ortigas Avenue itself.

=== Commercial development ===
In the 1990s, the Greenhills Shopping Center became known as a hub for computer parts and accessories at affordable prices for computer hobbyists and IT enthusiasts alike. The 1990s computer boom made computers mainstream and increased the demand for computer retail markets. As the Greenhills Shopping Center had become too crowded due to increasing demand during the computer boom, a computer retail store owner decided to set up shop along the once-desolate Gilmore Avenue in 1997.

According to local computer retailer PC Options, the business was the first computer retail store to open in the area, claiming that contrary to popular belief, the "PC" in the name does not actually refer to personal computers, but rather, coincidentally was the initials of the shop's founder and owner. As the area was being developed commercially, PC Options became popular for pioneering the do-it-yourself concept for computer customizations in the local market, serving as the catalyst for other computer retail shops to open in the area.

As several computer shops in Greenhills had to close due to renovations at the shopping center itself, Gilmore became established as a major IT hub in Metro Manila, and the Gilmore name became synonymous with computer retail.

=== No-contact apprehension controversy ===
On July 1, 2022, the Quezon City government began fully implementing its No Contact Apprehension Policy on several major roads. As a result, closed-circuit television cameras were installed along the intersection of E. Rodriguez Sr. Avenue and Gilmore Avenue.

However, motorists have criticized the policy due to unclear directives on how to navigate the intersection properly. In particular, motorists complained on social media after they were ticketed for turning "in the wrong lane" towards Gilmore Avenue, where Quezon City's bike lane network cuts the rightmost lane along E. Rodriguez Sr. Avenus in half.

== Route description ==
Gilmore Avenue is a major thoroughfare that acts as a southbound corridor for connecting the neighborhoods of New Manila and the neighborhood and commercial area along Tomas Morato Avenue to Ortigas Avenue, the cities of San Juan and Mandaluyong, and the Greenhills Shopping Center.

The road segment from Aurora Boulevard to N. Domingo Street has a single Class II paint-separated one-way bike lane. This lane connects the bike lanes along Aurora Boulevard and Granada Street as part of the national government's Metropolitan Bike Lane Network.

In 2021, the Metropolitan Manila Development Authority recorded 47 road crashes along Gilmore Avenue, resulting in a daily average of 0.12 road crashes that year. Of the 47 road crashes, 35 resulted in property damage, 11 had non-fatal injuries, and one was fatal.

== Landmarks ==
=== Computer and IT hub ===
The Aurora Boulevard-Gilmore Avenue intersection is a popular hub for IT-related products and services for computers and related components. The southern corners of Gilmore Avenue and Aurora Boulevard are filled with stores selling different kinds of computers and their accessories, both secondhand and brand-new.

Due to the COVID-19 pandemic in the Philippines, computer retail stores in the area reported a five-fold increase in demand for laptops and computers due to remote work and distance education arrangements.

== Nearby transport ==
Bus Route 11 (Gilmore-Taytay) serves the commercialized section of Gilmore Avenue, with its northern namesake terminus at the intersection of Gilmore Avenue and Nicanor Domingo Street. It is also served by Bus Route 10 (Doroteo Jose-Cubao), which stops at the intersection of Gilmore Avenue and Aurora Boulevard, and Route 6 (Quezon City Hall-Gilmore) of the Quezon City Bus Service has a stop in the Gilmore commercial area and a terminal at the nearby Robinsons Magnolia along Doña Hemady Avenue.

The nearest mass transport station from Gilmore Avenue is the Gilmore station of the Manila LRT Line 2, named after the road itself, and the future N. Domingo station of the MRT-4 monorail line.

The segment of Gilmore Avenue from Aurora Boulevard to Nicanor Domingo Street also contains a one-way, partially protected bike lane, linking the bike lane network along Aurora Boulevard and Granada Street.
