= Sale Creek, Tennessee =

- Census-designated place
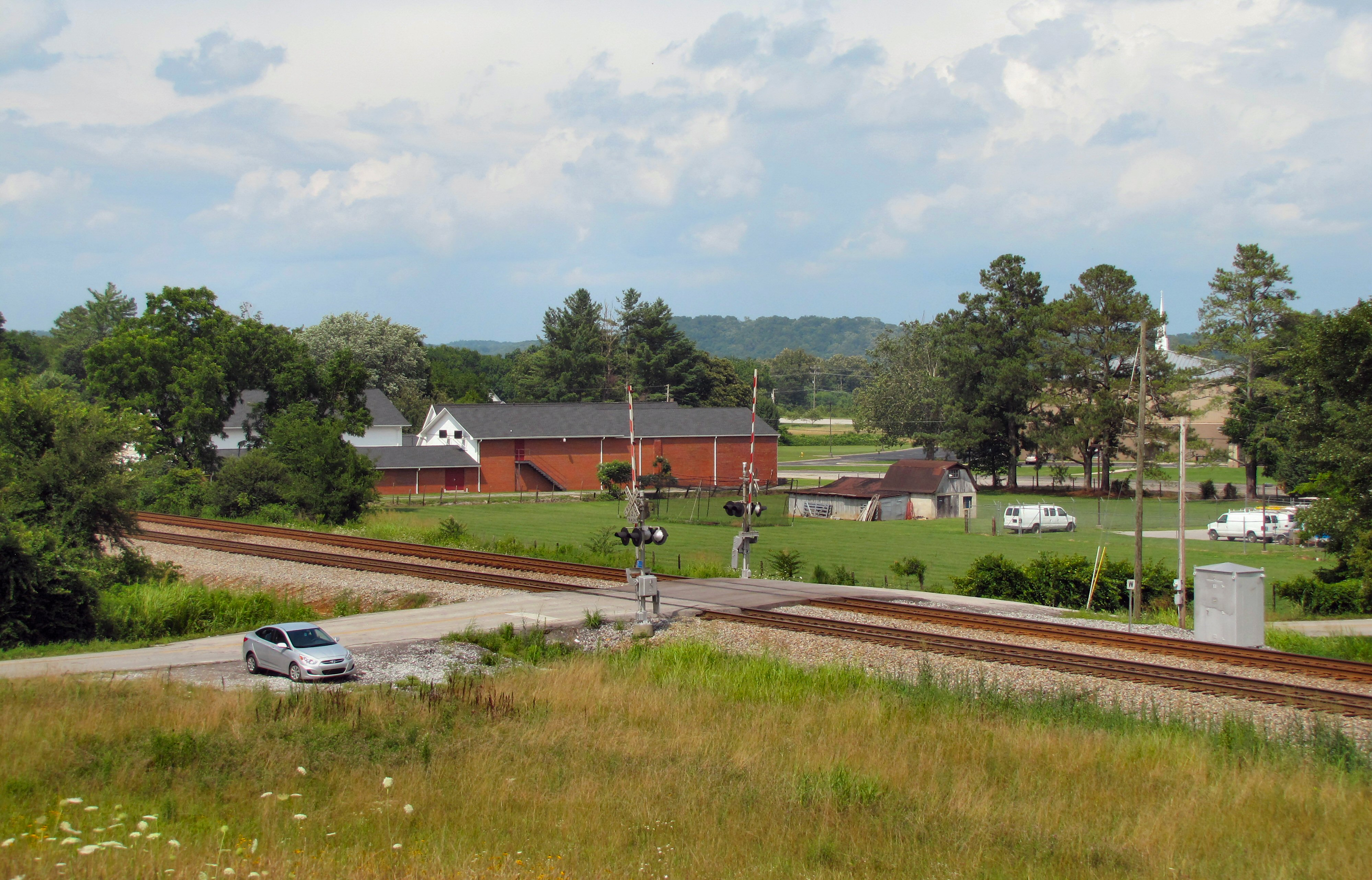
- View from Back Valley Road

- Location within Tennessee Location within the United States
- Coordinates: 35°22′56″N 85°06′32″W
- Country: United States
- State: Tennessee
- County: Hamilton

Area
  - Total: 32.72 sq mi (84.74 km^{2})
  - Land: 30.14 sq mi (78.06 km^{2})
  - Water: 2.58 sq mi (6.68 km^{2})
- Elevation: 725 ft (221 m)

Population (2020)
  - Total: 3,021
  - Density: 100/sq mi (38.7/km^{2})
- Time zone: UTC-5 (Eastern (EST))
  - Summer (DST): UTC-4 (EDT)
- ZIP code: 37373
- Area code: 423
- GNIS feature ID: 1300533

Sale Creek is an unincorporated community and census-designated place (CDP) in northern Hamilton County, Tennessee, United States. It is located along U.S. Route 27 between Chattanooga and Dayton, Tennessee.

Sale Creek's population was 2,901 as of the 2020 census. Sale Creek is home to Sale Creek Middle/High School. A local curiosity, the reportedly "haunted" Shipley Hollow Road, supposedly home to a Sasquatch-like creature, is in Sale Creek.

== Demographics ==
Historical population
Census	Pop.	Note	%±
2020	3,021		—
U.S. Decennial Census

=== 2020 census ===
As of the 2020 census, Sale Creek had a population of 3,021. The median age was 46.3 years. 19.9% of residents were under the age of 18 and 21.7% of residents were 65 years of age or older. For every 100 females there were 98.2 males, and for every 100 females age 18 and over there were 98.9 males age 18 and over.

0.0% of residents lived in urban areas, while 100.0% lived in rural areas.

There were 1,194 households in Sale Creek, of which 25.6% had children under the age of 18 living in them. Of all households, 58.5% were married-couple households, 16.8% were households with a male householder and no spouse or partner present, and 20.0% were households with a female householder and no spouse or partner present. About 22.6% of all households were made up of individuals and 13.3% had someone living alone who was 65 years of age or older.

There were 1,330 housing units, of which 10.2% were vacant. The homeowner vacancy rate was 1.1% and the rental vacancy rate was 4.9%.

Racial composition as of the 2020 census
Race	Number	Percent
White	2,797	92.6%
Black or African American	13	0.4%
American Indian and Alaska Native	6	0.2%
Asian	15	0.5%
Native Hawaiian and Other Pacific Islander	0	0.0%
Some other race	36	1.2%
Two or more races	154	5.1%
Hispanic or Latino (of any race)	58	1.9%

== History ==
The community takes its name from the creek which runs through it. The creek got its name from the auction held along its banks consisting of the goods and arms taken from the eleven towns of the militant Cherokee in the region before they were burned during the raid of Evan Shelby's troops in 1779 during the Cherokee–American wars.

The area was occupied by the 6th Tennessee Infantry US from September to December 1863 during the Civil War.

== MSA ==
Sale Creek is part of the Chattanooga, TN–GA Metropolitan Statistical Area.
