= A229 road =

Road in the United Kingdom

A229

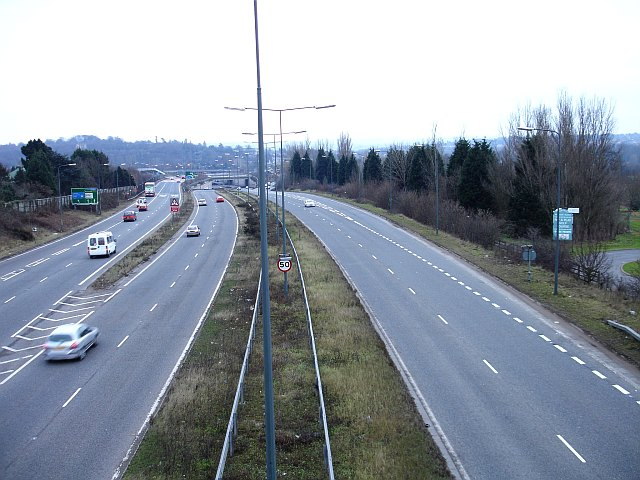
- A229 approaching Maidstone at Sandling, Kent

Route information
- Length: 29 mi (47 km)

Major junctions
- North end: Rochester
- A2 A230; M2 M20; A20 A249 A274 A262 A268; A21
- South end: Hurst Green, East Sussex

Location
- Country: United Kingdom

Road network
- Roads in the United Kingdom; Motorways; A and B road zones

The A229 is a major road running north–south through Kent from Rochester to Hawkhurst via Maidstone. It is a former Roman road that ran from Rochester to Hastings.

The road is well known for Blue Bell Hill, which connects Rochester to Maidstone through the North Downs, and links the M2 and M20 motorways. A popular ghost story documents a driver picking up a phantom female hitch-hiker on the A229 outside the Lower Bell pub, who subsequently disappears inside the driver's car.

== Route ==
The A229 is about 30 miles (48 km) long. The road passes through little in the way of built-up areas aside from the Medway Towns and Maidstone. It is principally a link between these two areas and the south coast around Hastings.

The road begins in the Medway town of Rochester at the top of Star Hill forming a junction with the A2. It then climbs up through the built-up area of Rochester and Chatham, passing Troy Town and Rochester Airport and the M2 motorway before descending the scarp slope of the North Downs at Blue Bell Hill. Below the road as it descends is the tunnel carrying High Speed 1. Once into the Medway Valley, there is a junction with the M20 motorway, and it follows the River Medway into Maidstone town centre. There are junctions with several main roads here, including the A26, A20 and A249.

Beyond Maidstone, the road climbs up Greensand Ridge to Loose, built on the ridge's southern slope, before running through the valley of the River Beult to Staplehurst. Beyond this, it follows the Weald through Cranbrook and climbs another hill to Hawkhurst. The road ends on the A21 London – Hastings Road near Hurst Green.

=== Traffic ===
The A229 through Maidstone is a major bottleneck on the route, with long daily morning and evening queues entering both sides of the town. The two bridges gyratory was upgraded in 2016 to allow two-way traffic alongside Fremlin Walk.

=== Checkpoints ===
In 2006, the road was set up with the then largest vehicle checkpoint campaign in Kent, in order to catch drug dealers and benefit fraudsters. Twenty-seven vehicles were apprehended, but there were no arrests.

== History ==
The road largely follows the route of Roman Road No. 13, as described by Ivan Margary, which ran from Rochester to Hastings. It was turnpiked between Rochester and Maidstone in 1728, then to Cranbrook in 1760.

The A229 number was assigned in 1923, following the turnpike road. The original route through Maidstone ran along Sandling Road and Week Street; the diversion along the riverside opened in 1978. It runs partially on the site of Fremlin's Brewery, whose production site in Maidstone had then recently closed.

== Ghost stories ==
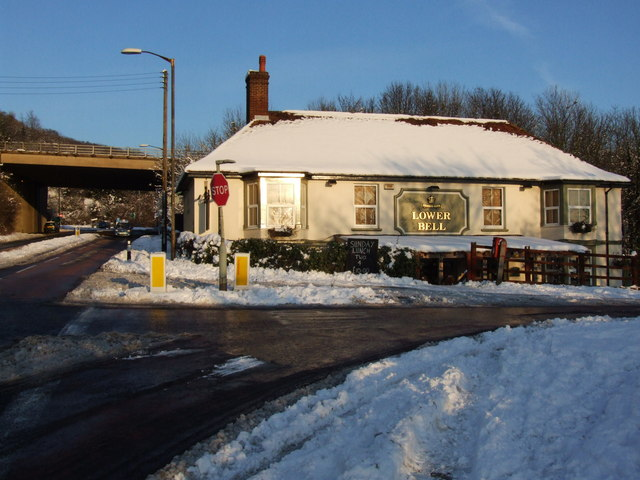
The Lower Bell pub at Blue Bell Hill on the pre-bypass A229; where the phantom hitch-hiker has been reported

On 19 November 1965, three women were severely injured in a road accident at Blue Bell Hill on the A229 when their Ford Cortina collided with a Jaguar. One of the women, 22-year-old Susan Browne from Gillingham, originally from Adelaide, was due to wed 23 year old RAF Junior Technician photographer Brian Wetton. Susan died five days later at West Kent Hospital in Maidstone. Susan had met the RAF technician at Woomera, from a RAF station near Huntingdon. They were to marry at Gillingham Roman Catholic Church.

The two other females, Judith Lingham, of Rochester, aged 22, and Patricia Ferguson of Dunfermline, aged 22, died soon after the accident.

In the accident, Gillian Burchett of Rochester, aged 21, survived. 23 year old Gillian Burchett met Prince Philip, Duke of Edinburgh on Friday 2 May 1969 at the opening of the first hoverport in Kent.

Since then, there have been several reports of ghosts relating to the accident. The basic story is that a driver passing the Lower Bell pub on the A229 spots a lone female dressed in white at the side of the road. He offers her a lift, and she gives him an address. Some time later, the driver looks in the rear view mirror to discover she has disappeared. Other variations of the story report a small purse or handbag left behind, or that when the driver reaches the intended address, he is informed by a family member there that his passenger died several years previously.

The legend has now become one of the best-known ghost stories involving phantom hitch-hiking in the United Kingdom, and the Blue Bell Hill Road is reported to be one of the most haunted roads in the country. On 13 July 1974, local bricklayer Maurice Goodenough ran into Rochester Police Station and reported he had run over a girl aged around 10 on Blue Bell Hill, who suffered several cuts, and had left her at the roadside wrapped in a blanket. When the police returned to the scene, the girl had disappeared, and despite an extensive 10-mile (16 km) radius search of the area, the girl was never found. A further incident of the lone female variant of the story was reported in 1992. Other variations are drivers reporting to have driven straight through a girl in the middle of the road, without any apparent injury.

It was featured on Strange But True on ITV, on Friday 6 October 1995.

In 2014, a local group wrote and directed the short film, The Ghost of Blue Bell Hill, which covers the numerous ghost stories relating to the road.

== See also ==
- List of haunted highways
