= Balete tree =

Several species of Filipino Ficus trees

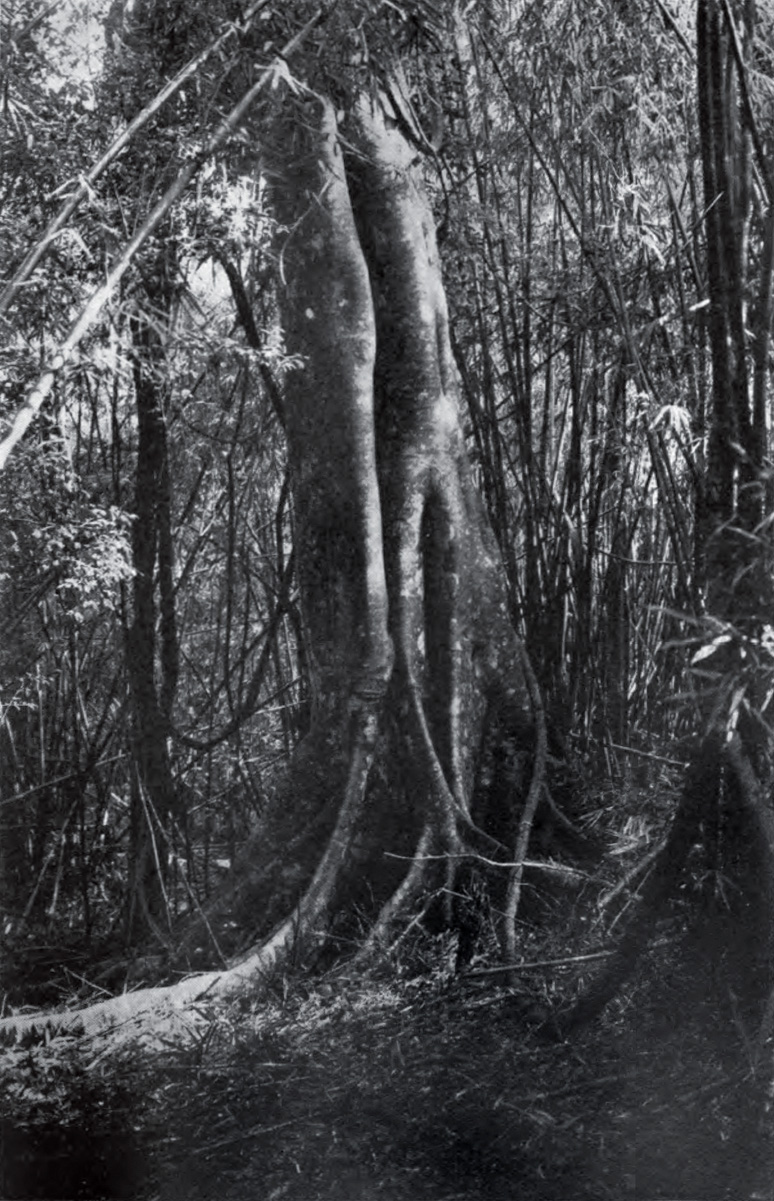
Balete tree from a Philippine forest, photographed in 1911

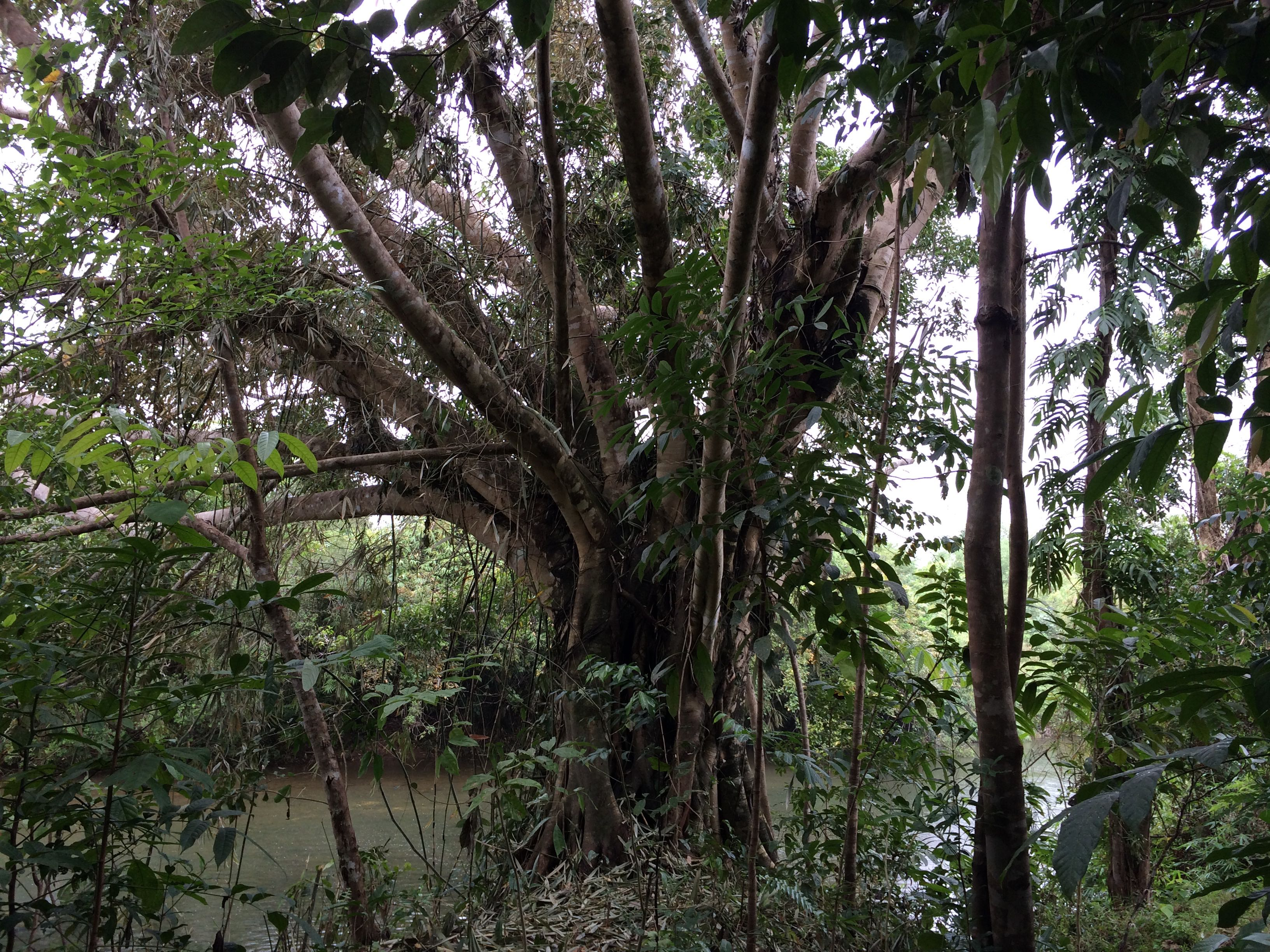
A balete tree near Tagkawayan in southern Luzon, Philippines

The baleté tree (also known as balité or baliti) are several species of trees in the Philippines from the genus Ficus, which are generally referred to as balété in Filipino.

A number of these are strangler figs, as they germinate upon other trees, before entrapping their host tree entirely and eventually killing it. Consequently the young plants are hemiepiphytes, i.e. epiphytes or air plants that grow several hanging roots which eventually touch the ground and take root. Some baletes produce natural rubber of an inferior quality. The Indian rubber tree, F. elastica, was formerly cultivated to some extent for rubber. Some of the species like tangisang-bayawak or Ficus variegata are large and could probably be utilized for match wood. The wood of Ficus species are soft, light, and of inferior quality, and the trees usually have ill-formed, short boles.

== List of species which shares the common name of Balete ==
- Ficus microcarpa
- F. arayatensis Warb.
- F. balete Merr.
- F. benjamina Linn.
- F. benjamina Linn. var. nuda Miq.
- F. clusioides Miq.
- F. concinna Miq.
- F. elastica Roxb.
- F. forstenii Miq.
- F. indica Linn.
- F. parvifolia Miq.
- F. payapa Blanco
- F. philipinenses Miq.
- F. retusa Linn.
- F. stipulosa Miq. Linn.
- F. variegata Blume

== Ornamental use ==
Baletes are planted as graceful trees along avenues in Manila and other large cities in the Philippines, and they are also excellent as shade trees. Several species of the tree are also use for bonsai making in the country.

Baletes are used as houseplants; however, it is a source of indoor household allergens which may cause respiratory allergy.

== Philippine folklore ==
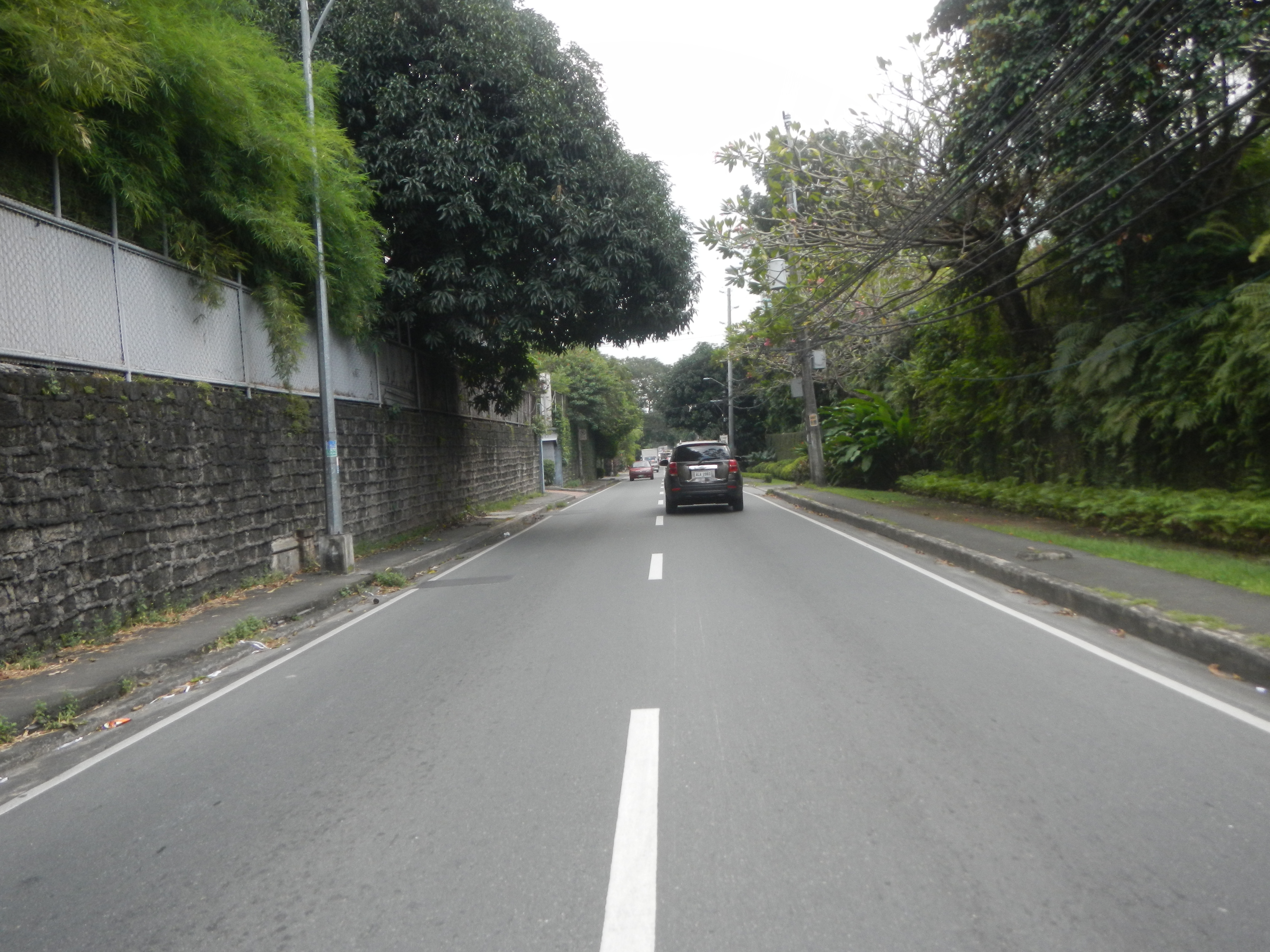
Balete Drive, allegedly one of the most haunted places of Quezon city, Philippines

In some areas of the country, some people believe that balete trees are dwelling places for supernatural beings (engkanto) like diwata, kapre or tikbalang. In some places, sorcery rituals are known performed inside the chambers formed by the tree. Also among others, some superstitious folks suggest not bringing in balete as decorative plants inside a house as they allegedly invite ghosts.

Balete Drive in New Manila, Quezon City, named after a enormous balete tree that used to stand in the middle of the street, is allegedly one of the most haunted places in the city. The tale of a white lady appears at night hailing cars that drive by has been circulated since the 1950s.

== Extreme examples ==
- The balete tree inside the OISCA Farm in Lumapao, Canlaon, Negros Oriental, is estimated by botanists from Silliman University to be around 1,328 years old. It would take at least 42 men to encircle its trunk. At the heart of this wide tree trunk is a cavity where lizards, bats and many insects have made it their home. With fireflies lighting it at night like a year-round Christmas tree, it is one of the city's main tourist attractions.
- A balete tree called "Millennium Tree" in Barangay Quirino, Maria Aurora, Aurora province is claimed to be the largest of its kind in Asia. It is estimated to be about more than 600 years old and 60 metres (200 ft) tall with its roots about 10 metres (33 ft) to 15 metres (49 ft) in diameter. It is possible for adult people to squeeze into the center of its root network.
- A 400-year-old balete tree in Barangay Campalanas in the Lazi, Siquijor is believed to be the oldest and the biggest in the province. The tree is noted for the spring that emanates from its base and flows straight into a man-made pool.

== Gallery ==
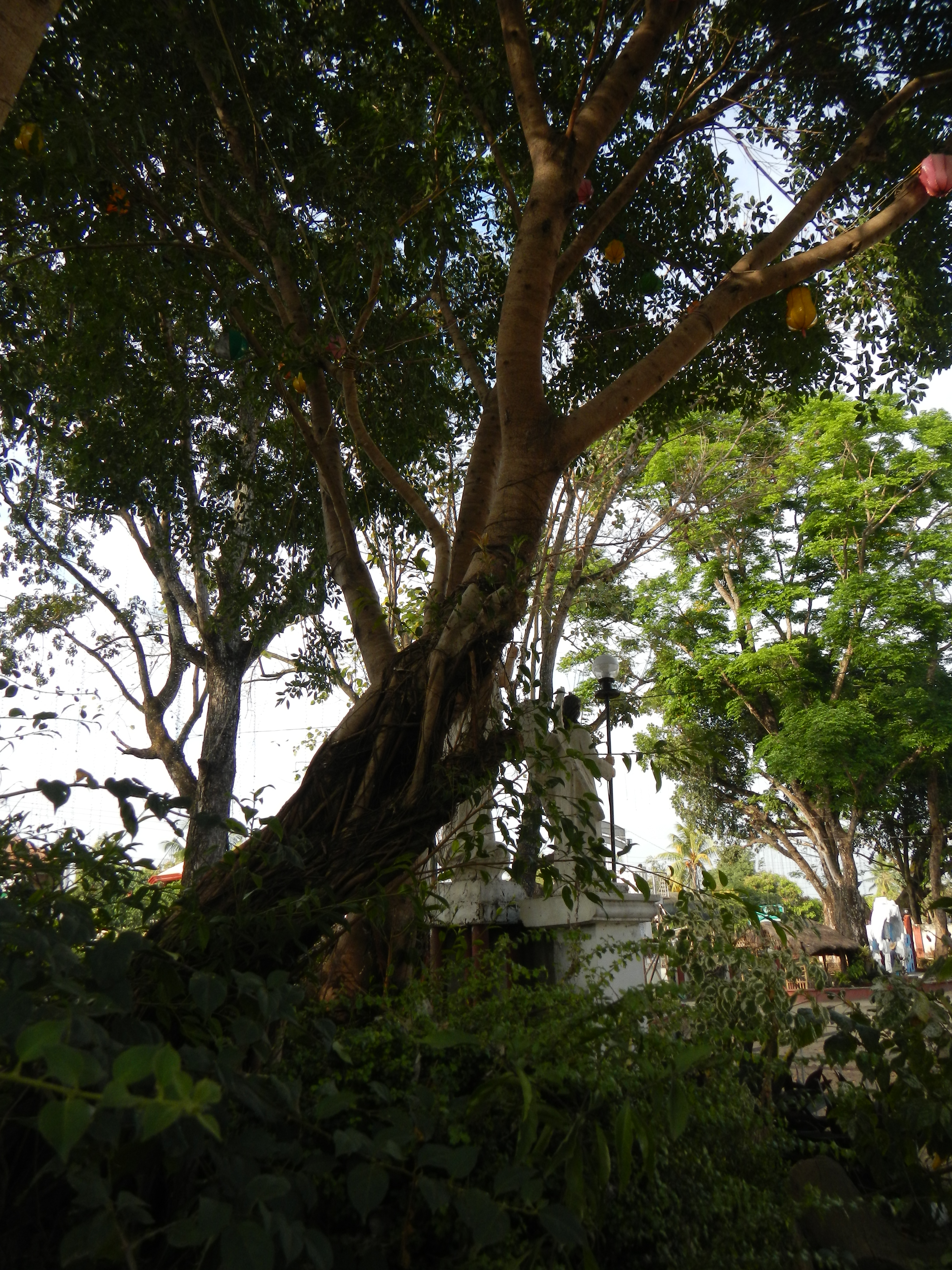
A balete tree in Cordon, Isabela, Philippines

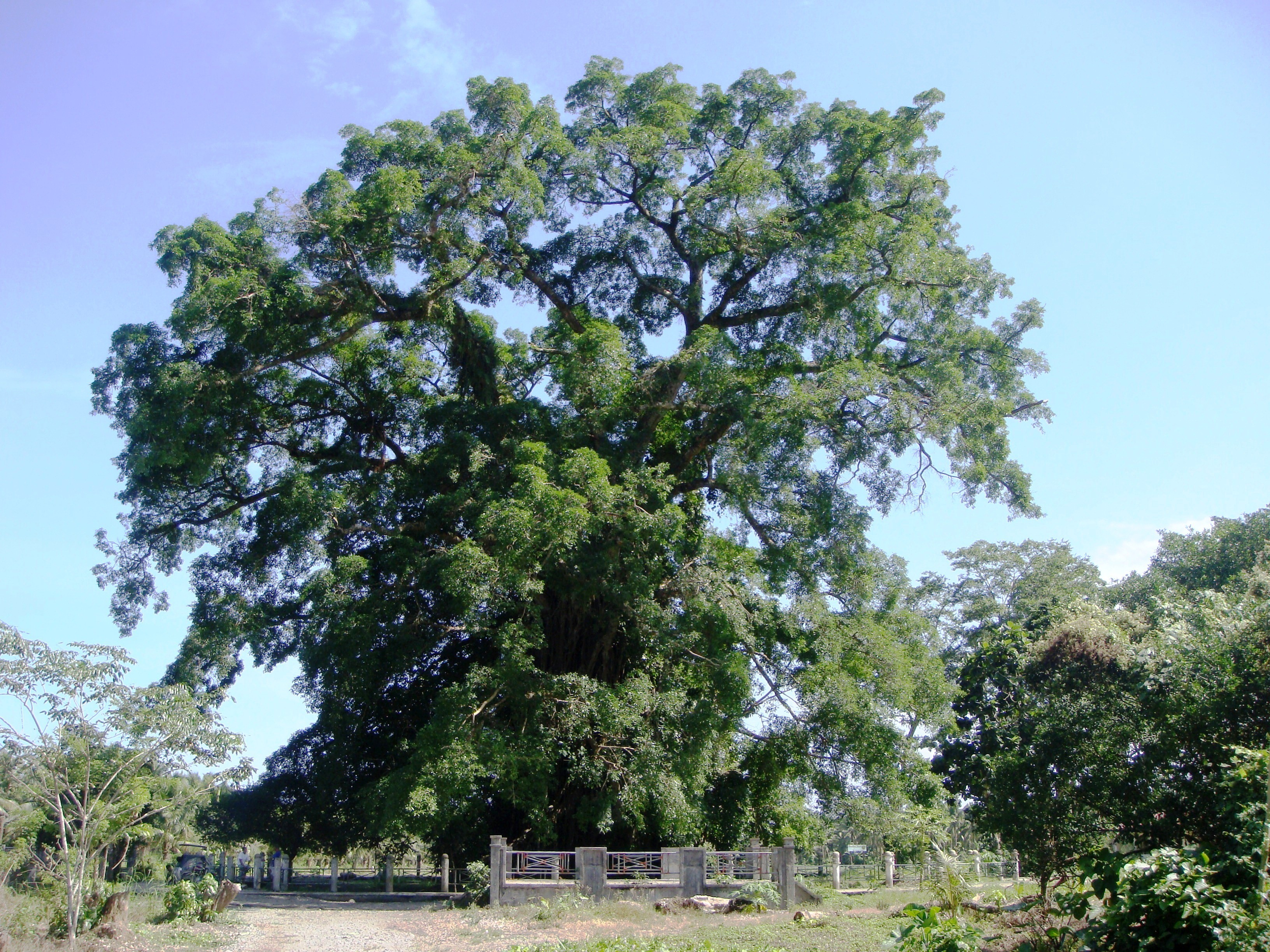
The “Millennium Tree” at Balete Park in Brgy. Quirino in Maria Aurora, Aurora province, Philippines.

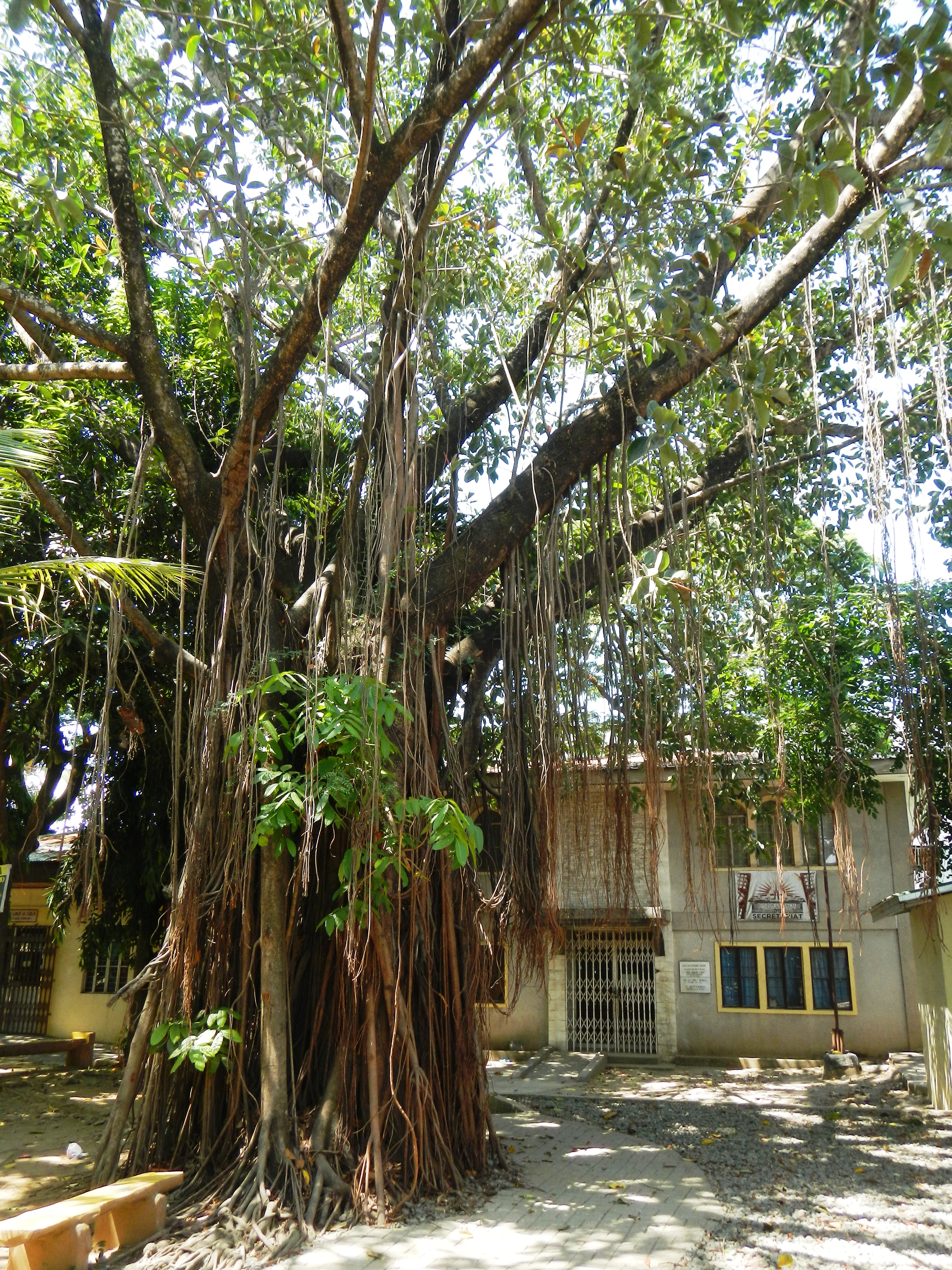
A balete in Bustos, Bulacan, Philippines.

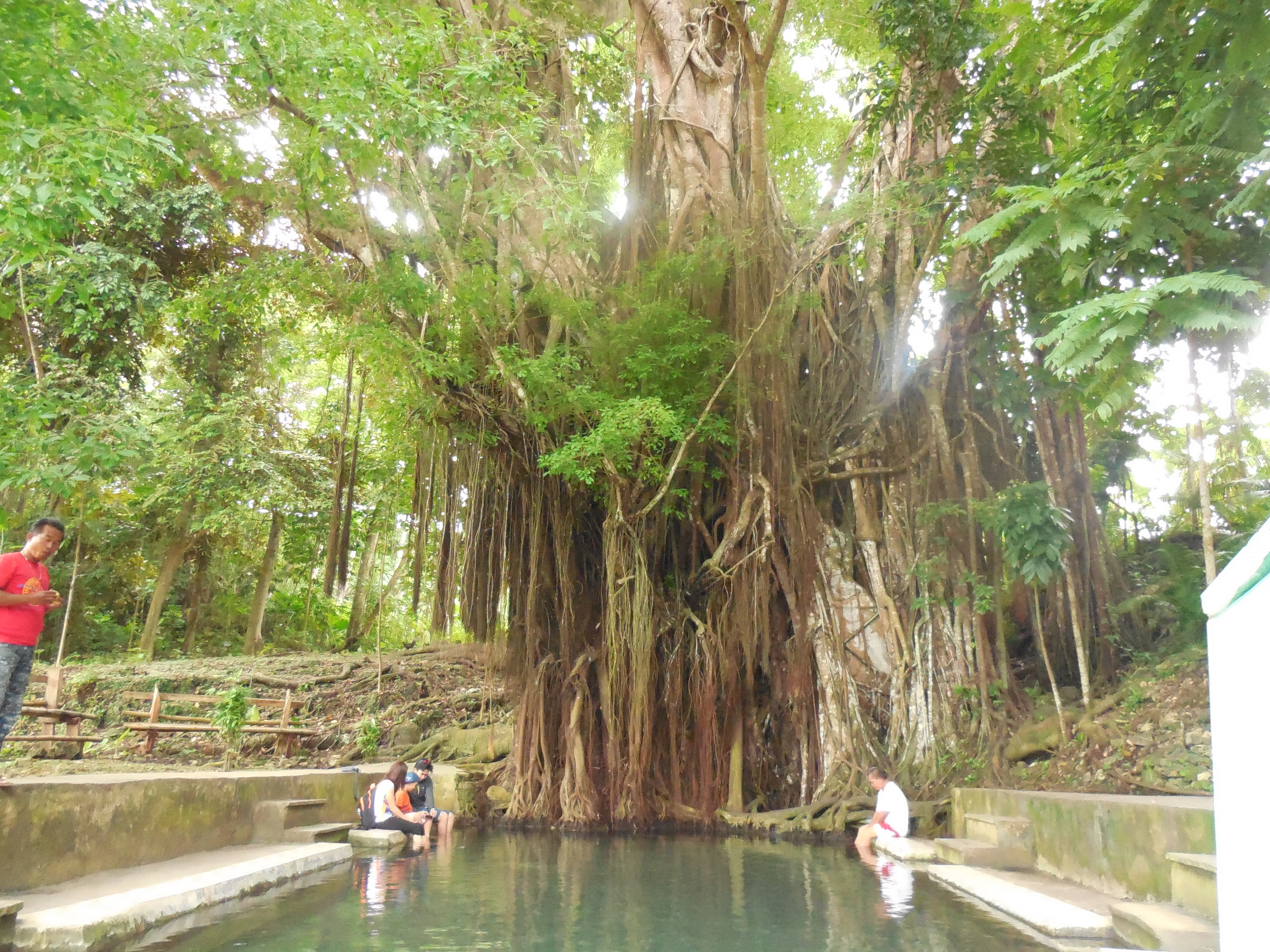
The 400-year-old balete tree of Barangay Campalanas, Lazi, Siquijor province, Philippines

== See also ==
- Bodhi tree, 2500 years ago Buddha attained enlightenment under this tree
- Kodama, spirits in Japanese folklore
- Largest banyan trees, Balete trees
- Peepal tree, Ficus religiosa
- Sacred tree
- Tree spirit
- Yorishiro, spirits-attracting object
