= Granada Street =

Road in Quezon City, Philippines

Coordinates: 14°36′34.3″N 121°02′14.2″E

- Senator Jose O. Vera Street; Ortigas–Granada Road
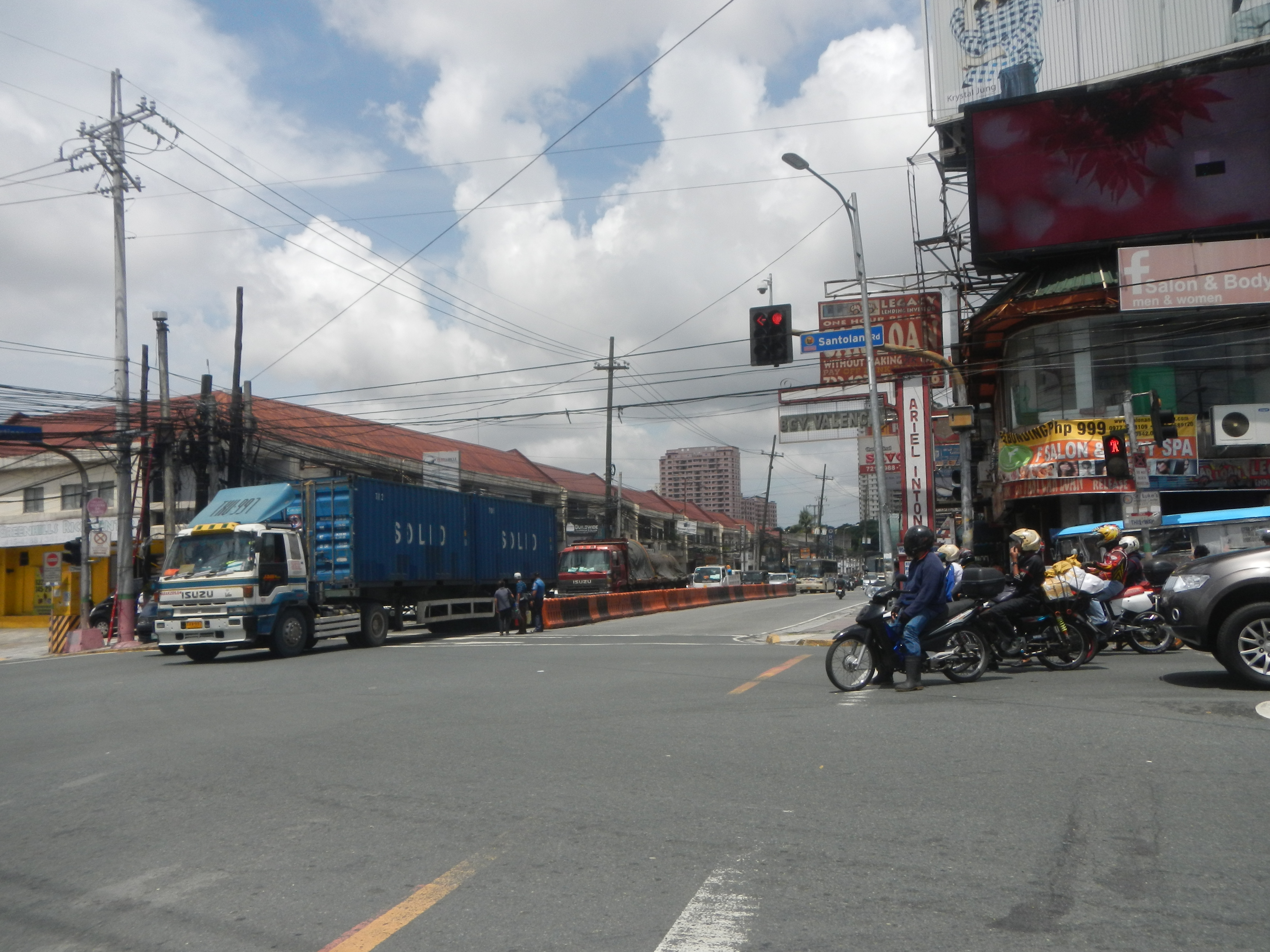
- Granada Street from the intersection with Col. Bonny Serrano Avenue
- Interactive map of Granada Street
- Namesake: José O. Vera
- Length: 0.597 km (0.371 mi)
- Component highways: N184
- Location: Quezon City
- North end: N184 (Gilmore Avenue) / N. Domingo Street in Quezon City
- South end: N184 (Ortigas Avenue) / Bonny Serrano Avenue at Quezon City–San Juan boundary

Granada Street (also known as Senator Jose O. Vera Street) is a road in Quezon City, Metro Manila, Philippines. It runs from Nicanor Domingo Street, as an extension of Gilmore Avenue, to the boundary with San Juan, where it terminates at Bonny Serrano Avenue and becomes Ortigas Avenue. The street is sometimes considered part of Ortigas Avenue by motorists.

== Route description ==
The land on which the street lies used to be part of an estate owned by the family of José O. Vera, founder of Sampaguita Pictures and a Philippine senator. In the late 1950s, Quezon City mayor Norberto S. Amoranto convinced the Vera family to permit construction of the street through their property, part of a project to improve connectivity between Quezon City — at the time the capital of the Philippines — and the surrounding suburbs, particularly those headed to New Manila from Mandaluyong and Pasig. The family sold 1 hectare (110,000 sq ft) of land to the Quezon City government at a significant discount to facilitate the construction of the road, and its completion enabled direct access to Quezon City from eastern Metro Manila without needing to go through side streets or Epifanio de los Santos Avenue. In 2004, the street was renamed after Vera by the Sangguniang Panlungsod of Quezon City.

The entire span of the road and its continuations have Class II paint-separated one-way bike lanes as part of the national government's Metropolitan Bike Lane Network.

Today, Granada Street is known for being home to several parol (Christmas lantern) vendors which line both sides of the street, giving it the name "Parol Row". Also known as the Parolan sa San Juan (transl. Lantern Area on the San Juan), selling lanterns here began in the 1990s when Sampaguita Pictures crewmen made lanterns and sold them outside the studio premises to generate extra income. Several vendors sell their lanterns here from September to December every year, with some selling the rest of the year as well. The street is also a culinary destination, having held this distinction since the 1970s. Modern-day dining establishments along the street include Gavino's Donuts, known for their Japanese-style donuts, and Mien-San, known for their Chinese-style steamed brisket and other dishes.
