= Boy Scout Lane =

Isolated road located in Stevens Point, Wisconsin

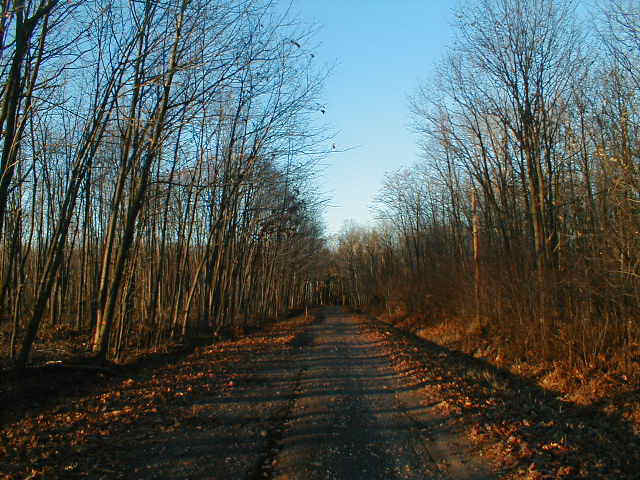
- Interactive map of Boy Scout Lane
- Length: 2,500 ft (760 m)
- Location: Stevens Point, Wisconsin, United States
- Coordinates: 44.468260°N 89.608578°W

Boy Scout Lane is an isolated road located in Stevens Point, Wisconsin. A number of ghost stories and urban legends have become associated with the road, including the fictional deaths of a troop of Boy Scouts. The area has been the subject of several paranormal investigations, and is a popular destination for youths hoping to experience a paranormal event. The land surrounding Boy Scout Lane is now privately owned and is off limits to the general public.

== Overview ==
Boy Scout Lane is in the Town of Linwood, Portage County, Wisconsin. It is located west of the Wisconsin River Golf Club, on West River Drive (West), and is situated between Cemetery Road and Little Chicago Road. It is unpaved and about 2,500 feet (760 m) long.

The road was named Boy Scout Lane because the land that it is located near was once owned by the Boy Scouts of America, who planned to use the land to build a Scout camp. Although the camp was never constructed and the land remains woodland, the name was still used.

== Urban legend ==
According to a local urban legend, the road is named for a troop of Boy Scouts who were killed while on a camping trip in the 1950s or 1960s. In some variations the murderer is the troop's Scoutmaster, in others their bus driver; in some versions, a small group of Scouts leave their camp during the night and accidentally drop their lantern, resulting in a forest fire that kills the entire troop.

Other variations of the story exist including one in which the Scouts are killed after their bus crashes or accidentally catches fire. There is also a version in which the Scouts vanish without explanation and are never found. In some versions of the legend, two Boy Scouts escape the fate of the rest of the troop and try to find help, only to become lost in the woods where they die of starvation and/or exposure. In most variations of the legend it is said that the dead Scouts haunt the forest where they died and can be heard hiking through the undergrowth, or their lights can be seen at night as they seek help or their fellow Scouts.

Stories circulated in "haunted travel guides" include visitors reporting a strong sense of foreboding or "being watched", the sound of footsteps or breaking branches coming from multiple directions, red or white lights sometimes described as resembling swinging lanterns or flashlight beams, ghostly buses or figures, and "childlike hand prints" on cars stopped in or driven through the area.

== See also ==
- Scouting in Wisconsin
