= Shipley Hollow Road =

Road in Sale Creek, Tennessee, USA

Shipley Hollow Road is an allegedly haunted road in Sale Creek, Tennessee. These stories go back 150 years and are mentioned in several local books, including Ghosts of the Southern Tennessee Valley. The ghost or creature is referred to as Pitty-Pat and locals call this area "Pitty Pat Hollow". Whether the "Pitty-Pat" is a ghost child or a creature varies, depending on the source.

== Legend ==
According to the local legend, in 1775 a female settler and her four children were crossing a bridge on their way home in a horse and buggy. Suddenly they heard a "pit, pat, pit, pat," and a beast approximately the size of a cat, but with the appearance of a Sasquatch, ran out on its hind legs in front of the horse. The beast is commonly referred to as an imp, though the physical description can vary. This action spooked the horse to such an extent that the buggy flipped and the woman was thrown from it. The legend varies, with the woman either dying instantly or living long enough to see the beast carry off her children to devour them. Some sightings were reported of a beast jumping in front of buggies, and a few of the beast charging motor vehicles.

== Major intersections ==
The entire route is in Hamilton County.

Location	mi	km	Destinations	Notes
	0.0	0.0	Daugherty Ferry Road - Sale Creek	Southern terminus
	2.0	3.2	Providence Road - Lakesite, Graysville	Northern terminus
1.000 mi = 1.609 km; 1.000 km = 0.621 mi

== See also ==
- List of reportedly haunted locations in the United States
