= Balete Drive =

Street in Quezon City, Philippines

Balete Drive

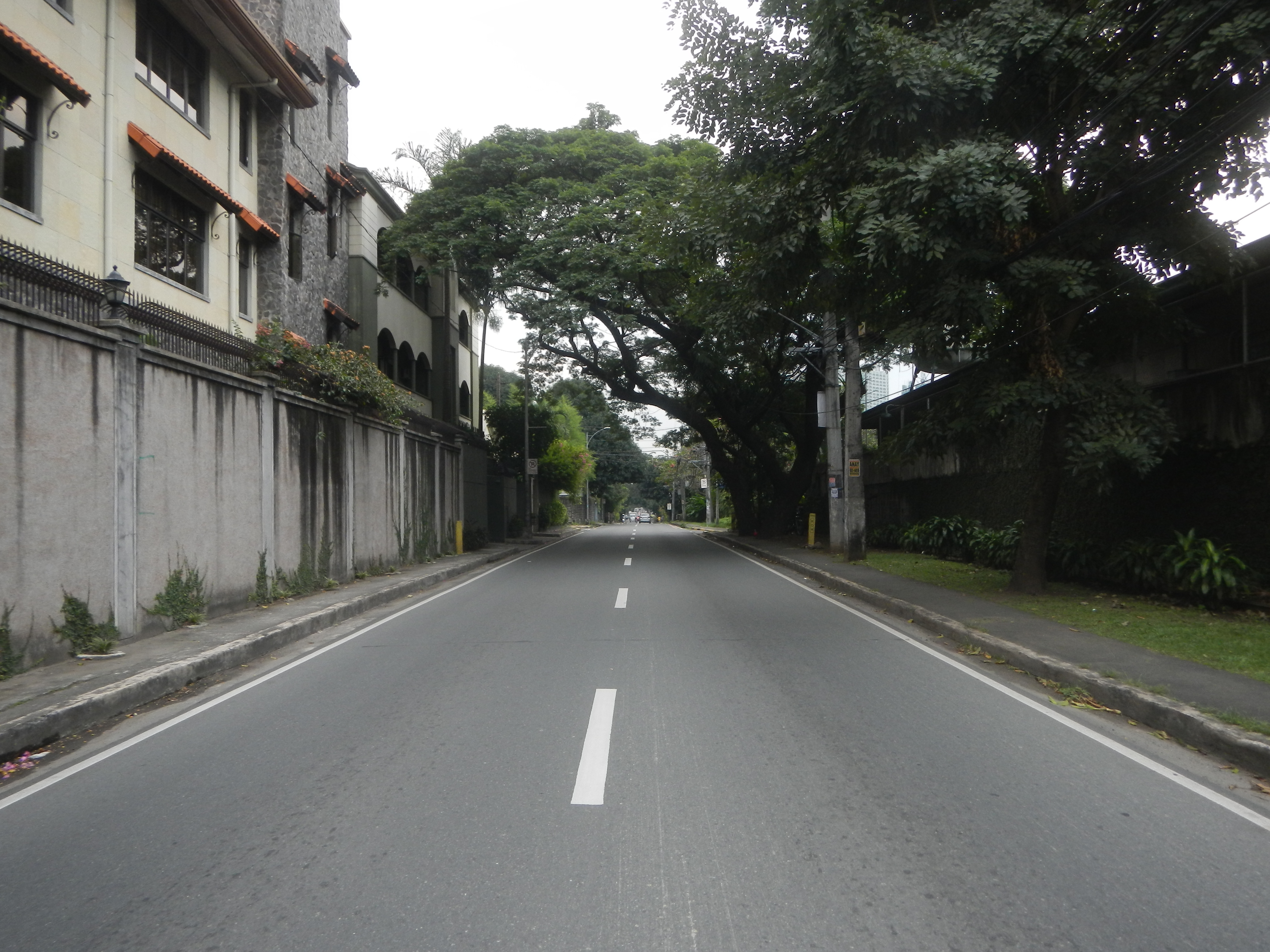
- Balete Drive near its intersection with Campanilla Street

Route information
- Maintained by the Department of Public Works and Highways – Quezon City 2nd Engineering District
- Length: 1.3 km (0.81 mi)

Major junctions
- North end: Dead end, 160 meters (520 ft) north of Eulogio Rodriguez Sr. Avenue
- N180 (Aurora Boulevard)
- South end: N. Domingo Street

Location
- Country: Philippines
- Major cities: Quezon City

Highway system
- Roads in the Philippines; Highways; Expressways; List

Balete Drive is an undivided two-lane street and the main thoroughfare of New Manila, Quezon City, Philippines. The road is a major route for jeepneys and cabs, serving the New Manila area and connecting Eulogio Rodriguez Sr. Avenue and Nicanor Domingo Street in Quezon City.

The road is noted for the balete trees that previously lined it and urban legends of a ghost of a lady in white.

== Route description ==
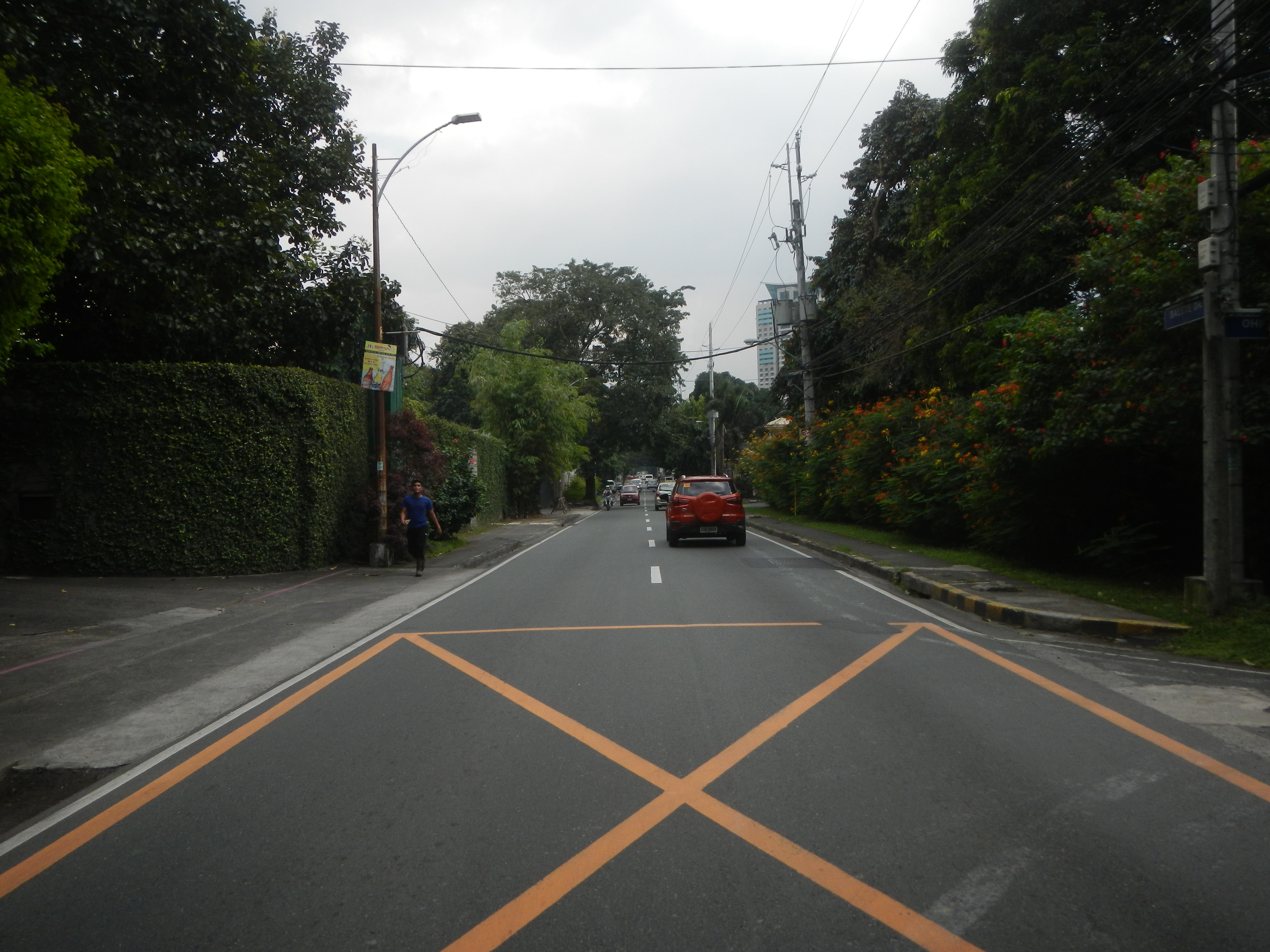
Balete Drive at its intersection with Ohio Street, looking south towards Bougainvilla Street

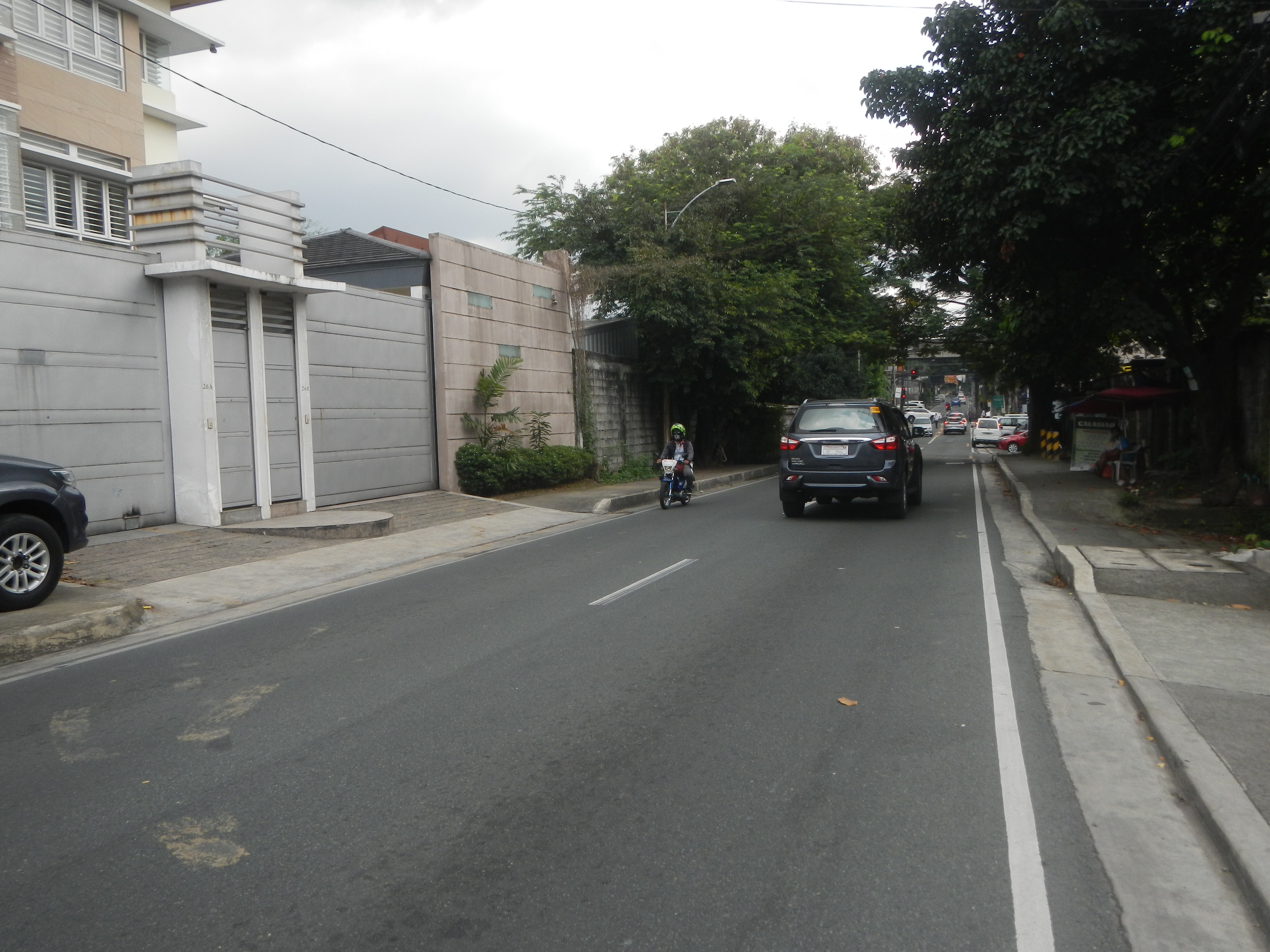
Balete Drive looking south towards Aurora Boulevard

Balete Drive connects the long span between Eulogio Rodriguez Sr. Avenue and Nicanor Domingo Street in New Manila, Quezon City. The Balete Drive corner at E. Rodriguez is a bustling business area hosting fast food and other establishments.

The north end of Balete Drive starts at a dead end next to Diliman Creek, 160 meters (520 ft) north of Eulogio Rodriguez Sr. Avenue. Running in the north-northeast to south-southeast direction, it ends in a T-junction with Nicanor Domingo Street near the San Juan Reservoir for a total length of 1.3 kilometers (0.81 mi). One of its major intersections is with Aurora Boulevard, a major road that leads to Cubao, a major commercial district in Quezon City. The Manila Line 2 Betty Go-Belmonte station is located 330 meters (1,080 ft) east of this junction.

Balete Drive is considered a national tertiary road of the Philippine highway network.

== History ==
Balete Drive was named after a massive balete tree that used to stand in the middle of the road. Although the exact construction date of the road is unknown, it was cemented and asphalted and became a main thoroughfare during the regime of President Ferdinand Marcos in the early 1970s. There are several Spanish houses in the area, including the famous 200-year-old "Centennial House", which supports the claim that Balete Drive has been in use since the late Spanish era towards the end of the 19th century.

== Urban legend ==
In the past, the street was lined with large balete trees that darkened the area considerably and made it appear "frightening" to some Manila residents. In Philippine folklore, balete trees are believed to be a "home for spirits and mysterious creatures". Various legends and folklore have circulated since the 1950s that the street was haunted.

Most legends describe a kaperosa (white lady) ghost, a popular character in Philippine folklore, who is supposedly haunting taxi drivers "for eternity". According to legend, the ghost is a teenage girl who was run over and killed by a taxi driver at night, then buried around a balete tree on Balete Drive. One variation of the legend claims a student at the University of the Philippines was sexually assaulted and killed by a taxi driver, and her spirit roams the street looking for her murderer. Another version of the story claims that a female resident of one of the ancestral mansions lining Balete Drive was abused and killed by her own family, and her spirit haunts the road, seeking help from passing drivers. According to local rumors, the legend of Balete Drive was "fabricated by a reporter in 1953 in order to come up with an interesting story".

In 2005, a Quezon City barangay official proposed that the city could use the legends to boost tourism by declaring the street "haunted" and making it available for Halloween parties.

In a 2021 opinion piece by former Presidential Press Secretary Buddy Gomez, former Calbayog city prosecutor's office lawyer Deogracias Ortega claimed the entire legend was an embellished fabrication of a magazine article in 1952. The actual accident occurred along Eulogio Rodriguez Sr. Avenue (formerly España Extension) in 1949. Ortega and his friends, including Leni Garchitorena, were on a joyride when the accident occurred, with Garchitorena, who was the driver at that time, the only occupant sustaining fatal injuries.

== In popular culture ==
The street is featured in the 1988 horror film Hiwaga sa Balete Drive, which retells the supposed paranormal activities experienced by people who live or have traveled along it.

The Netflix-exclusive Singaporean anime-influenced series Trese features Balete Drive as the location of a crime scene. However, the exact intersection and the street where it occurs are fictional, as 13th Street in New Manila does not actually intersect Balete Drive.

== See also ==
- Major roads in Metro Manila
- Aurora Boulevard
- Haunted highway
- List of reportedly haunted locations in the Philippines
