= Magnolia (Philippine company) =

Philippine dairy company

Magnolia Inc.
- Trade name: Magnolia
- Formerly: Philippine Dairy Products Corporation (1981–2002)
- Type: Joint venture (1981–2002); Subsidiary (since 2002)
- Industry: Food processing
- Predecessor: San Miguel Corporation - Magnolia Division
- Founded: 1981; 45 years ago
- Headquarters: 23/F The JMT Corporate Condominium, ADB Avenue, Ortigas Center, Pasig, Metro Manila, Philippines
- Area served: Worldwide
- Key people: Ramon S. Ang (Chairman); Francisco S. Alejo III (President)
- Products: Butter, margarine, processed cheese, all-purpose cream, ice cream, frozen desserts, UHT milk
- Owner: San Miguel Corporation
- Parent: San Miguel Food and Beverage, Inc.
- Subsidiaries: Sugarland Corporation; Golden Food and Dairy Creamery Corporation
- Website: www.magnolia.com.ph

Magnolia Inc. (formerly Philippine Dairy Products Corporation) is a Philippine food company owned by San Miguel Food and Beverage, Inc., a subsidiary of San Miguel Corporation. It is one of the largest dairy companies in the Philippines. The company comprises over 90% of the non-refrigerated margarine market and over 80% of refrigerated margarine market in the Philippines.

== History ==
Magnolia, Inc. was established in 1981 when San Miguel Corporation (SMC) spun off its butter, margarine and processed cheese assets into a joint-venture with New Zealand Dairy Board (NZDB), forming Philippine Dairy Products Corporation (PDPC). The company was a business unit of SMC's Magnolia Division and engaged in the manufacture of butter, margarine and processed cheese. Its production facility was the Magnolia Dairy Products Plant on Aurora Boulevard. The Aurora Boulevard plant remained as its production facility until 2000 when it transferred to a new facility in General Trias, Cavite.

In 1994, PDPC acquired the margarine brands Star Margarine and Dari Creme from Procter & Gamble Philippines (formerly the Philippine Manufacturing Company and Procter & Gamble PMC).

In 1994, SMC spun off its ice cream and milk business into a joint-venture with Nestlé, forming Magnolia-Nestlé Corporation. The Aurora Boulevard property remained under the ownership of SMC and served as the venture's main production facility and site of its ice cream parlor. After SMC withdrew from the venture in 1998, albeit still owning the property, Nestlé Philippines continued with the business under the Nestlé brand name (the ice cream parlor became known as Nestlé Creamery). PDPC and Nestlé's ice cream production was gradually transferred a new facility in General Trias, Cavite. By 1999, Nestlé ceased ice cream production operations in the Aurora Boulevard facility. In 2008, SMC sold the Aurora Boulevard property to Robinsons Land Corporation (RLC), a subsidiary of JG Summit Holdings, Inc. News reports cited that the property was sold reportedly in the amount of P1.6 billion. The property was developed by RLC into a mall (Robinsons Magnolia) and residential condominiums (The Magnolia Residences). One of the mall's first establishments was a Magnolia-franchised ice cream parlor named Magnolia Flavor House, which operated from 2012 to 2017, as a fitting homage to the property's roots.

In July 2002, SMC gained full ownership of the company after NZDB divested its stake. With this, the company name was changed to Magnolia, Inc. and became a subsidiary of San Miguel Pure Foods Company, Inc. (now San Miguel Food and Beverage, Inc.), the corporate parent for the entire food and beverage portfolio of SMC.

Magnolia, Inc. has since diversified from the manufacture of butter, margarine and processed cheese, to include jelly snacks, cooking oil, salad aids and the revived Magnolia ice cream and milk products.

== Magnolia, Inc. brands ==
- Baker's Best
- Buttercup
- Daily Quezo
- Dari Creme
- Delicious
- Jellyace
- La Pacita
- Magnolia
- San Mig Super Coffee
- San Miguel Del Mar
- Star

=== Formerly Brand ===
- Anchor
- Nestlé Magnolia
- Sugarland

== Plants ==
Magnolia, Inc. has plants in:

- General Trias
- Santa Rosa, Laguna

=== Aurora Boulevard site ===
The plant facility located along Aurora Boulevard, Quezon City was inaugurated in 1970 by SMC as the Magnolia Dairy Products Plant, producing ice cream, milk, butter, margarine and processed cheese. The property where the plant stood was owned by SMC. When the plant closed, the property was sold to Robinson's Malls.
