= Betty Go-Belmonte Street =

Road in Quezon City, Philippines

Coordinates: 14°37′9″N 121°2′28″E

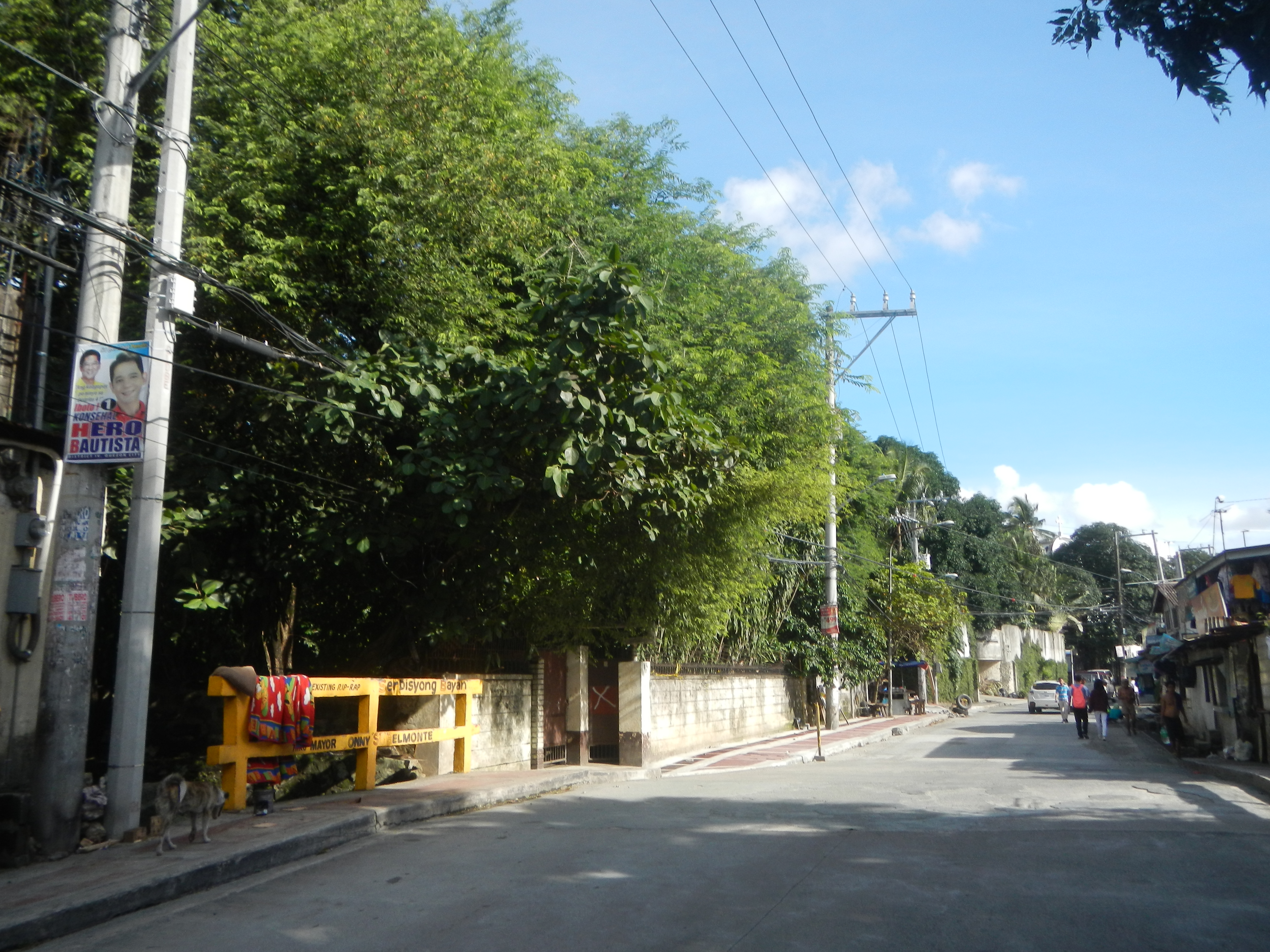
- Betty Go-Belmonte Street at the border of barangays Mariana and Immaculate Conception in New Manila
- Interactive map of Betty Go-Belmonte Street
- Former name: Valley Road
- Namesake: Betty Go-Belmonte
- Length: 1.2 km (0.75 mi) from Google Maps
- Location: Quezon City
- North end: E. Rodriguez Sr. Avenue in Immaculate Conception
- Major junctions: N180 (Aurora Boulevard)
- South end: N. Domingo Street in Kaunlaran

Betty Go-Belmonte Street is a street in the New Manila district of Quezon City, Philippines. It is a notable road in a generally northwest-southeast orientation between the junction with E. Rodriguez Sr. Avenue and the junction with N. Domingo Street, all within New Manila. It is served by Betty Go-Belmonte station of the LRT Line 2.

The street was named after a notable Filipino journalist who was an institution with her contributions to the writing press during the Martial Law period as well as being one of the founders of two of the major broadsheet newspapers in the country, namely the Philippine Daily Inquirer and the Philippine Star. She was also the wife of former Quezon City Mayor and House Speaker Feliciano Belmonte Jr.

Until 1997, the section of the street located in Mariana and Immaculate Conception was called Valley Road. In 2016, a resolution was passed by the Quezon City Council to name the full length of the street to N. Domingo Street as Betty Go-Belmonte Street.

== Route description ==
Betty Go-Belmonte Street commences at the intersection with E. Rodriguez Sr. Avenue in the north. It heads due southeast, crossing Poinsettia Street and Ilang-Ilang Street. It then straightens up and crosses Cannon Street and Bougainvilla Street before traveling southeast again, crossing Lantana Street and Acacia Street. Afterwards, it turns east and crosses Rosal Street and Rosario Drive before turning south again before crossing Aurora Boulevard. After crossing Aurora Boulevard, Betty Go-Belmonte goes southeast again, crossing Manggahan Street. It then terminates at the junction with N. Domingo Street, and after a short turn to the southwest, it continues further as P. Tuazon Boulevard.

== See also ==
- Aurora Boulevard
