= Robinsons Magnolia =

- Fresco area of Robinsons Magnolia in 2023
- Location: Quezon City, Philippines
- Coordinates: 14°36′53″N 121°2′17″E
- Address: Aurora Boulevard corner Doña M. Hemady Street, Kaunlaran
- Opened: August 13, 2012; 14 years ago
- Developer: Robinsons Land Corporation (RLC)
- Manager: Robinsons Malls (a division of RLC)
- Owner: Robinsons Land Corporation (RLC)
- Num. of stores: 230
- Num. of anchor tenants: 6
- Floor area: 108,000 m^{2} (1,160,000 sq ft)
- Floors: Main Mall: 7 (4 floors with 1 mezzanine and 2 basement levels for parking); Expansion: 6 + basement BPO: 5
- Parking: more than 1000 cars
- Public transit: Gilmore; Betty Go-Belmonte; 3 Robinsons Magnolia; 6 Robinsons Magnolia
- Website: www.robinsonsmalls.com/mall-info/robinsons-magnolia

Robinsons Magnolia is a shopping mall owned and operated by Robinsons Malls. The mall opened on August 13, 2012. It is the 31st mall opened by Robinsons and the company's third mall in Quezon City. It has a gross floor area of 108,000 square metres (1,160,000 sq ft). Robinsons Magnolia is adjacent to the four-tower Magnolia Residences where the iconic Magnolia Ice Cream production plant once stood.

== History ==
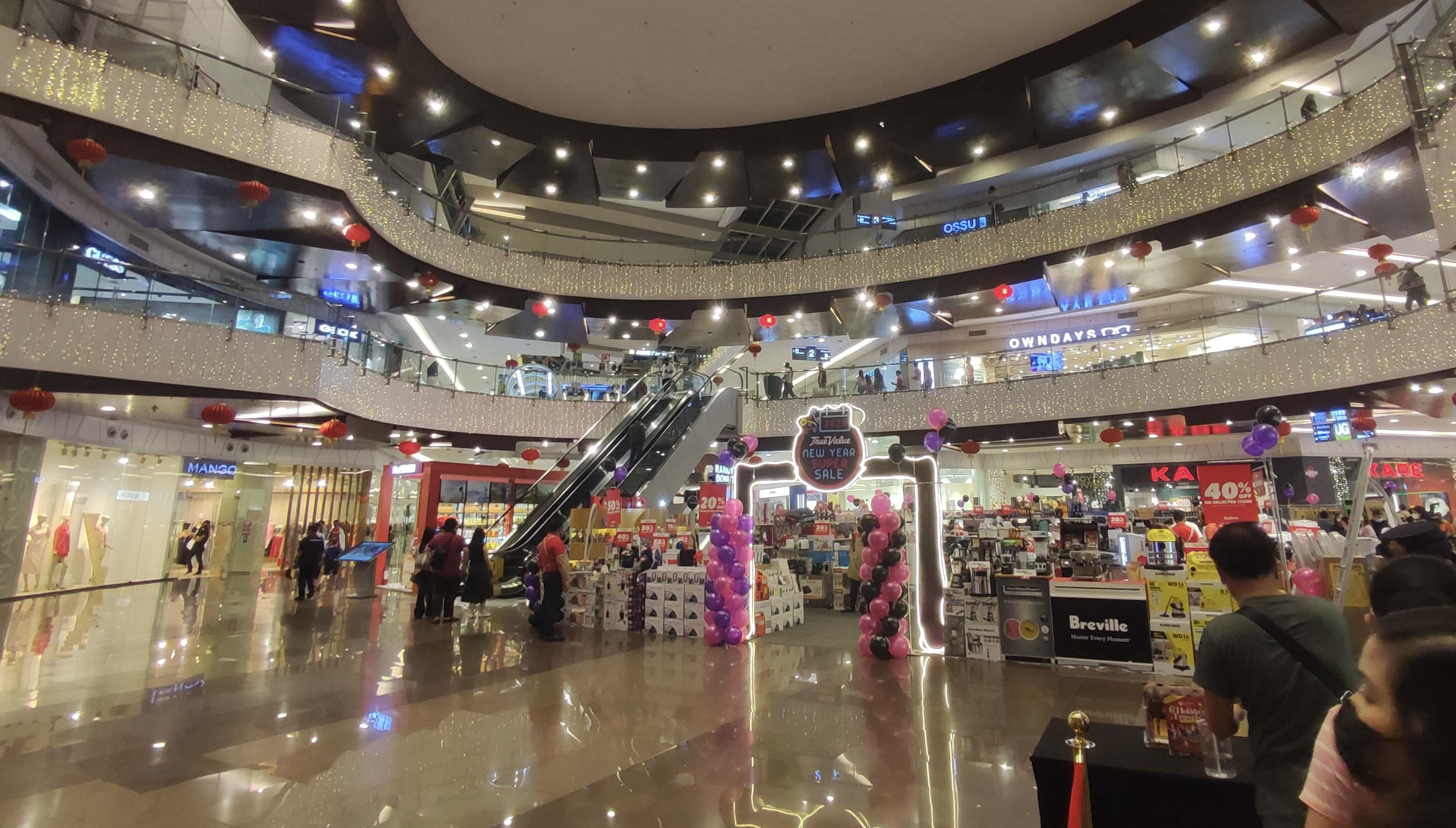
Photo upon entry of Robinsons Magnolia.

The Magnolia Dairy Products Plant was established in 1970 when Magnolia transferred production from its original 1925-era factory in Quiapo, Manila. Designed by Leandro Locsin, the plant produced ice cream, milk, butter, margarine and processed cheese. The property where the plant stood was owned by San Miguel Corporation, which also owned the Magnolia brand. The facility also housed the main branch of its Magnolia ice cream parlor. The ice cream parlor was retained and relocated within the mall.

In 1981, SMC spun off its butter, margarine and processed cheese assets into a joint-venture with New Zealand Dairy Board, forming Philippine Dairy Products Corporation (now Magnolia, Inc.). The Aurora Boulevard plant remained as its production facility until 2000 when it transferred to a new facility in General Trias.

When SMC spun off its ice cream and milk business into a joint-venture with Nestlé in 1996, forming Magnolia-Nestlé Corporation, the Aurora Boulevard property remained under the ownership of SMC and served as the venture's main production facility and site of its ice cream parlor. After SMC withdrew from the venture in 1998, Nestlé Philippines continued with the business under the Nestlé brand name (the ice cream parlor became known as Nestlé Creamery). Nestlé's production was gradually transferred to a new site and in 1999, Nestlé closed down operations in the Aurora Boulevard facility.

In 2008, SMC sold the property to Robinsons Land Corporation (RLC), a subsidiary of JG Summit Holdings, Inc. News reports cited that the property was sold reportedly in the amount of P1.6 billion. The property was developed by RLC into a mall (Robinsons Magnolia) and residential condominiums (The Magnolia Residences). One of the mall's first establishments was a Magnolia-franchised ice cream parlor named Magnolia Flavor House, which operated from 2012 to 2017, as a fitting homage to the property's roots.

On March 14, 2022, a fire broke out the Robinsons Department Store located on the third floor which reached the first alarm. This was quickly controlled and did not inflict further damage.

== Complex ==
Robinsons Magnolia facade viewed from Aurora Boulevard

=== Main Mall ===
Main mall was opened on August 13, 2012. It has total of seven floors. (4 floors with 1 mezzanine and 2 basement levels for parking). It was connected with the expansion wing.

=== New Wing ===
The New Wing contains brand new MovieWorld cinemas, a food hall managed by Tasteless Food Group named Public Eatery, and the Capilla de San Lorenzo, a Roman Catholic chapel. Construction of the New Wing began in September 2016 and it was opened on September 20, 2019.

=== The Magnolia Residences ===
The Magnolia Residences is a complex of four residential towers adjacent to Robinsons Magnolia. It is made of two 38-storey and two 36-storey residential towers.

== Expansion ==
In 2017, a six-level new wing was constructed adjacent to the Main Mall. It was opened to the public on September 20, 2019. The Plaza was redeveloped and the water feature was removed. The new expansion wing contains four new cinemas including a VIP theater, a family amusement center and a chapel. Atop the new wing is a five-level BPO office space.
