= CD-R King =

Filipino retail chain

- Company type: Private
- Industry: Retail
- Founded: 1997
- Founder: Nicholson Santos and Henry Ngo
- Defunct: 2020
- Fate: Declined sales due to the COVID-19 pandemic, competition with high store outlets
- Headquarters: Quiapo, Manila, Philippines
- Area served: Philippines
- Products: Consumer electronics, Appliances
- Divisions: STARK; California ECO-BIKE; Mobile King; Kenko World
- Website: Official website (archived)

CD-R King (styled as cd-r king or CD-R KING) was a Filipino retail chain that sold discounted computer parts and gadgets, electronic appliances, and accessories. CD-R King's branches were often located in malls, where they competed against higher-end electronics retailers.

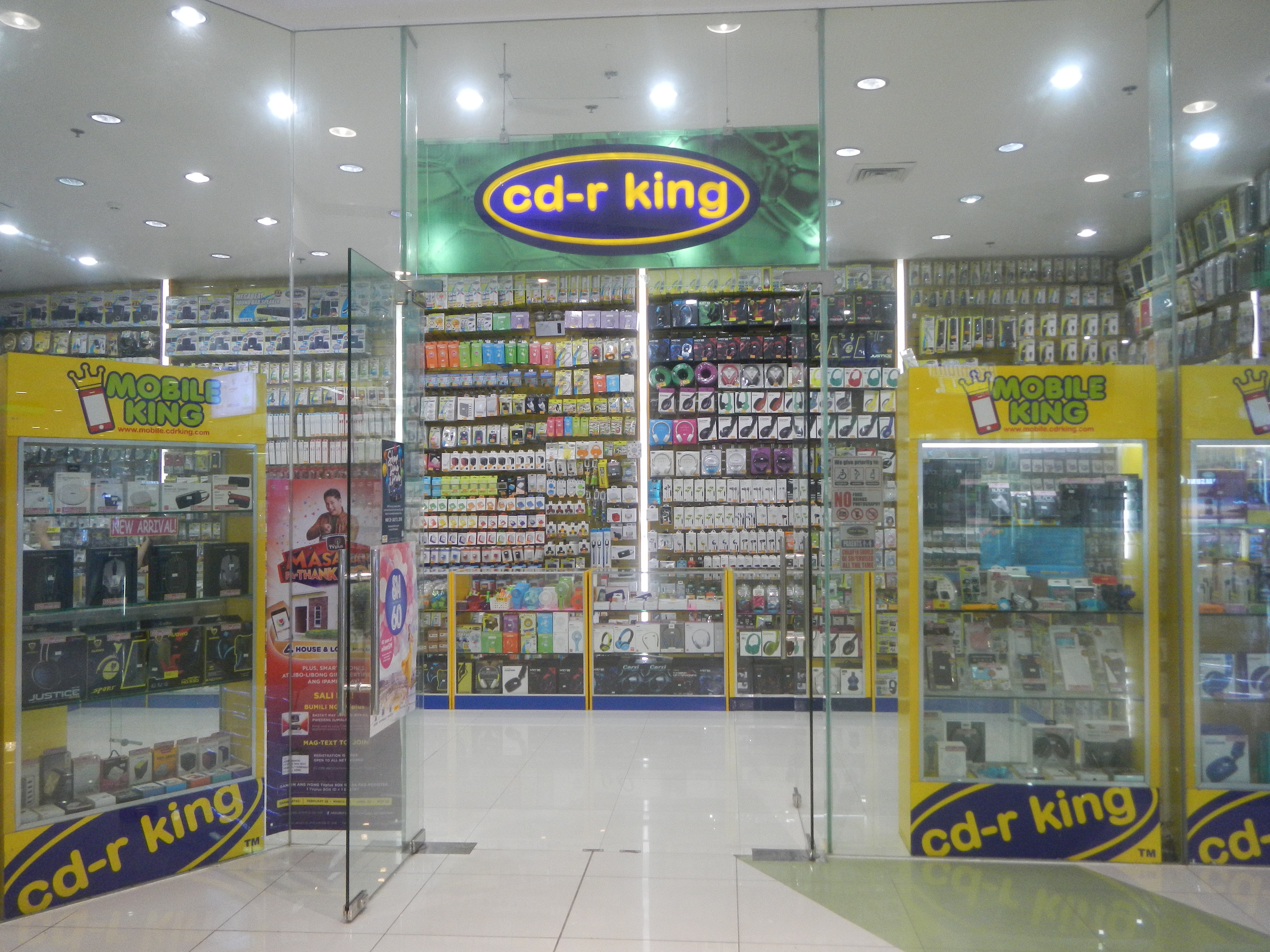
CD-R KING outlet, 2018

== History ==
CD-R King proprietors Nicholson Santos and Henry Ngo opened its first shop in Paterno Street, Quiapo, Manila. It was initially known for selling recordable media in bulk at a fraction of the cost in the early 2000s, later expanded their line to other products in response to changing market and technological trends over the years, even going so far as to offering goods which have little or nothing to do with optical media or information technology in general, (e.g. ornaments and other such accessories; this prompted the introduction of their branding divisions like STARK for appliances, California ECO-BIKE for electric bicycles, Mobile King for cell phones, and Kenko World for their cell phone accessories and health and beauty products). Most of CD-R King's products were sourced from original design manufacturers from China, Taiwan and other countries, and were sold under their own brand. Many CD-R King-branded products were re-branded versions of the same or similar products sold in parallel by their manufacturers.

In 2016, it became the popular gadget store in Metro Manila and spread out to Luzon, then to Cebu City, and later had branches nationwide with more than 350 branches (excluding Kenko World branches) in all major shopping mall chains in the country. It expanded further with a peak of 500 outlets.

Increasing competition with e-commerce platforms like Shopee and Lazada led to a significant downturn in operations. By 2020, there were only around 10 branches left. One of its last branches is located in Robinsons Magnolia.

=== Copyright concerns ===
The company's operations gained controversy as the Optical Media Board accused CD-R King in 2008 of facilitating copyright infringement through inexpensive media supplied by the company, imposing a ₱1.5 million penalty for failing to produce permits for some of its optical media disc importations.

In 2013, Globe Telecom signed agreements with several major retailers of gadgets and IT equipment, including CD-R King, in a bid to curb the sale of illegal repeaters or signal boosters in the country. The agreement binds retailers from selling signal boosters that do not comply with the specifications set by the National Telecommunications Commission.

== Products ==
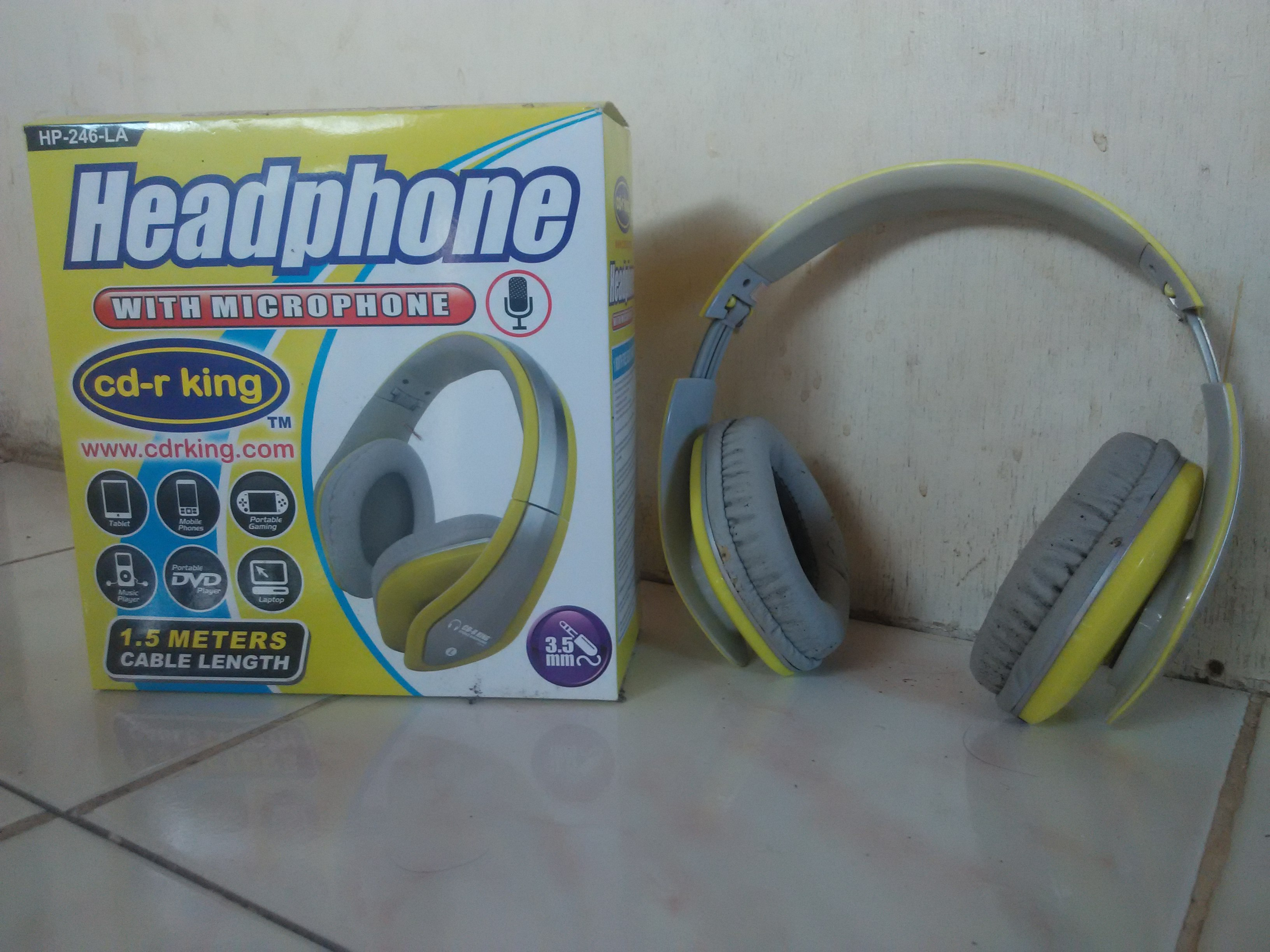
A CD-R King-branded headphone.

CD-R King sold various products under their CD-R King, Stark and Kenko World brands, in addition to licensed merchandise based on Disney properties among other things. Aside from optical storage media, they also sold cellular phones, electronic gadgets, accessories, appliances, electric bicycles and even health and beauty products.

== Reception ==
Despite gaining popularity for offering gadgets and computer accessories at discounted prices, the company gained a somewhat dubious reputation for its build quality, with some items breaking down shortly after purchase.

== See also ==
- Dick Smith
- Octagon Computer Superstore
- Silicon Valley
