= Pert Plus =

American brand of shampoo and conditioner

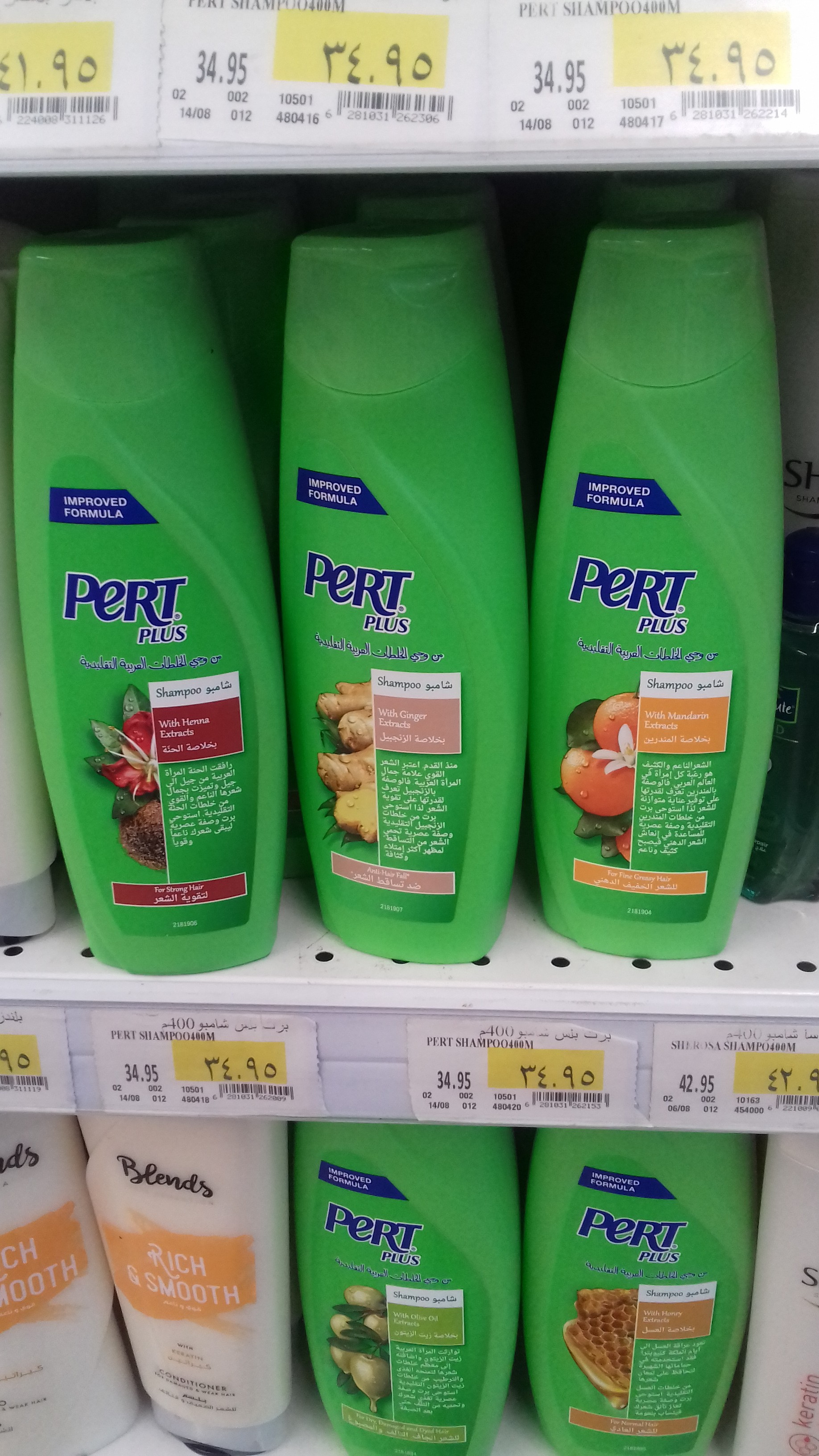
- Pert Plus Shampoo bottles in a store in Cairo, Egypt
- Product type: Shampoo
- Current owner: Sodalis USA (formerly High Ridge Brands)
- Country: United States
- Introduced: 1987 (as Pert Plus); 1980 (as Pert)
- Discontinued: 2022 (as Rejoice from Philippines)
- Markets: United States
- Previous owners: Procter & Gamble
- Ambassadors: Jaboom Twins; Hazel Ann Mendoza; Jill Yulo; Kim Chiu; Kathryn Bernardo; Julia Montes; Maine Mendoza; Maymay Entrata
- Website: https://www.pert.com/

Pert Plus (also known as Pert 2 in 1) is an American brand of shampoo and conditioner (2-in-1) products owned by Sodalis USA (formerly High Ridge Brands LLC). It was introduced in 1987 by Procter & Gamble as a reformulation of Pert shampoo introduced in 1980. The 2-in-1 product is marketed by Procter & Gamble in New Zealand and Australia as Pert 2 in 1 and in Asia as Rejoice.

== History ==
Investment firm Najafi Companies acquired North American trademark rights to Pert and Pert Plus from P&G in 2006, moving its production to subsidiary Innovative Brands LLC. In 2010, Innovative sold Pert, Pert Plus and Sure to Helen of Troy. The company has several products for various hair types.

In June 8, 2021, Helen of Troy announced it has sold its personal care business, including Pert and Pert Plus to High Ridge Brands (now Sodalis USA).

In 2022, Procter & Gamble Philippines was annouce to discontinue of Rejoice after 40 years of Marketing.
