= Betty Go-Belmonte station =

LRT Line 2 station in Quezon City

Betty Go-Belmonte
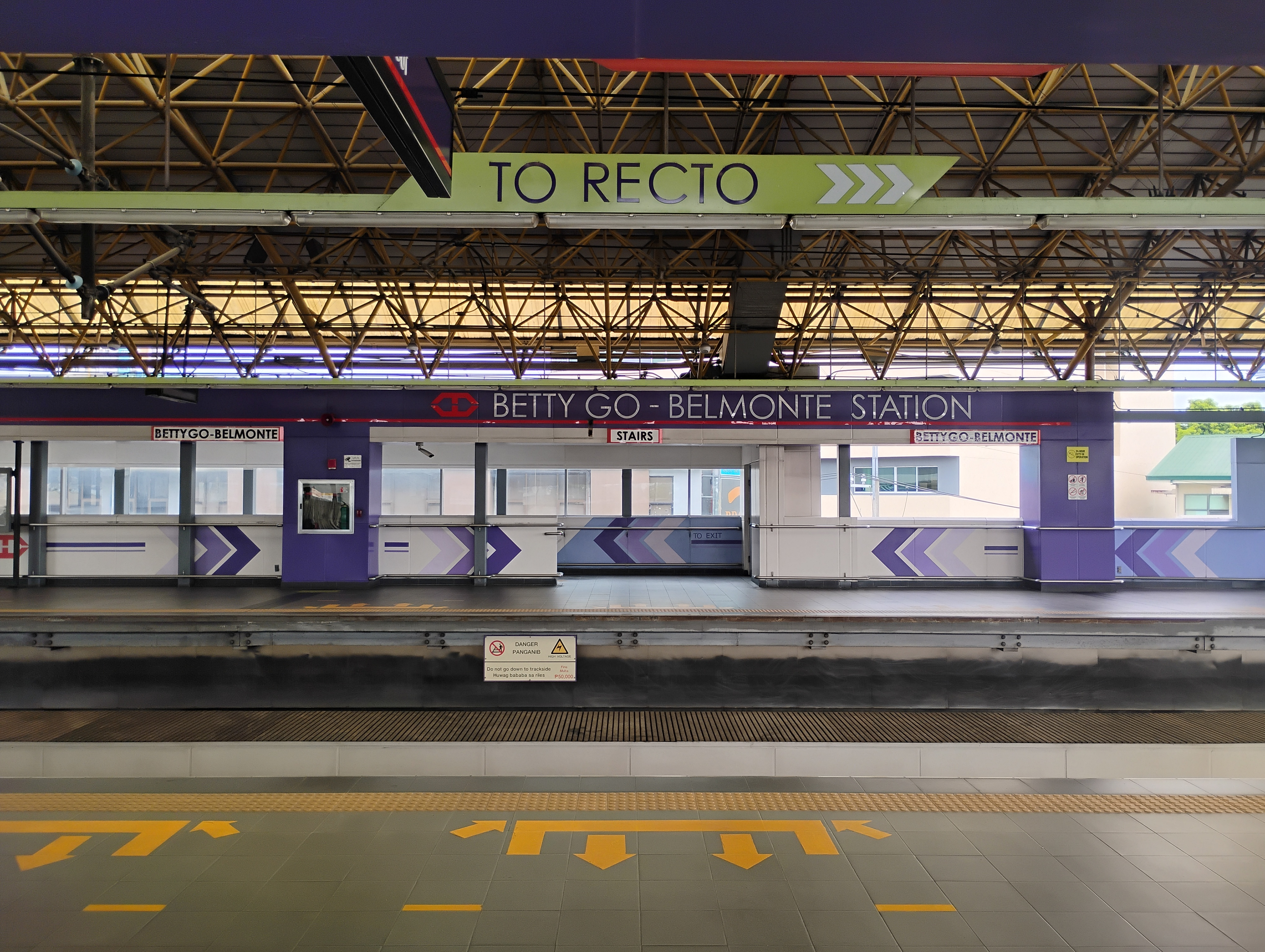

General information
- Location: Aurora Boulevard, Mariana, Quezon City, Metro Manila; Philippines
- Coordinates: 14°37′6″N 121°2′33″E
- Owner: Department of Transportation
- Operator: Light Rail Transit Authority
- Line: LRT Line 2
- Platforms: 2 (2 side)
- Tracks: 2
- Connections: 3 Betty Go-Belmonte

Construction
- Structure type: Elevated
- Accessible: Concourse: South Entrance only Platforms: All platforms

Other information
- Station code: PL07

History
- Opened: April 5, 2004; 22 years ago
- Former names: Boston

Services
Preceding station	Manila LRT	Following station
Araneta Center–Cubao towards Antipolo	LRT Line 2	Gilmore towards Recto
Track layout
Location
- Location within Metro Manila Location within Luzon Location within Philippines

Betty Go-Belmonte station is an elevated Light Rail Transit (LRT) station located on the LRT Line 2 (LRT-2) system in Mariana, Quezon City, the Philippines.

The station during its inception was formerly called as Boston station, after the adjacent street of the same name, but was renamed into the current name due to the minor realignment of some stations (the other being V. Mapa) that has caused the change of proximity to the Betty Go-Belmonte Street. It is named after Betty Go-Belmonte, the founder of The Philippine Star and wife of House Speaker Feliciano Belmonte Jr..

The station is the seventh station for trains headed to both Antipolo and Recto stations. It is considered to be one of the least busiest stations on the line.

== See also ==
- Manila Light Rail Transit System Line 2
