= Silicon Valley Computer Group Philippines =

Computer retail store in the Philippines

Silicon Valley
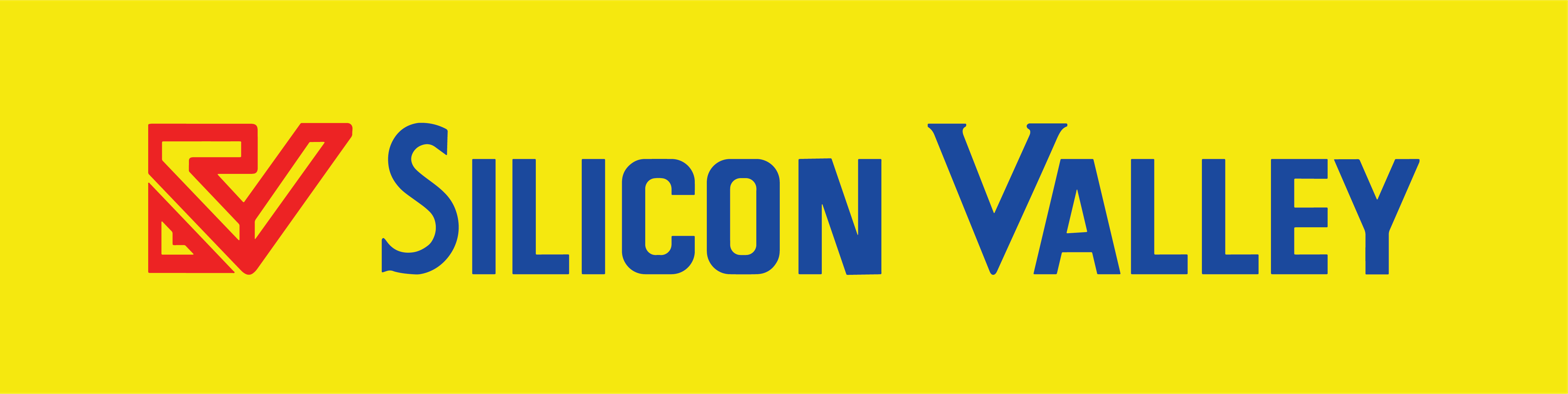
- Type: Private
- Industry: Retail
- Founded: December 15, 1985; 40 years ago
- Headquarters: Quezon City, Philippines
- Area served: Philippines
- Key people: Timothy Tia(President and CEO)
- Products: Consumer electronics
- Website: siliconvalley.com.ph

Silicon Valley Computer Group Philippines or simply known as Silicon Valley is a consumer electronics retail shop in the Philippines with 63 branches, nationwide.

== History ==
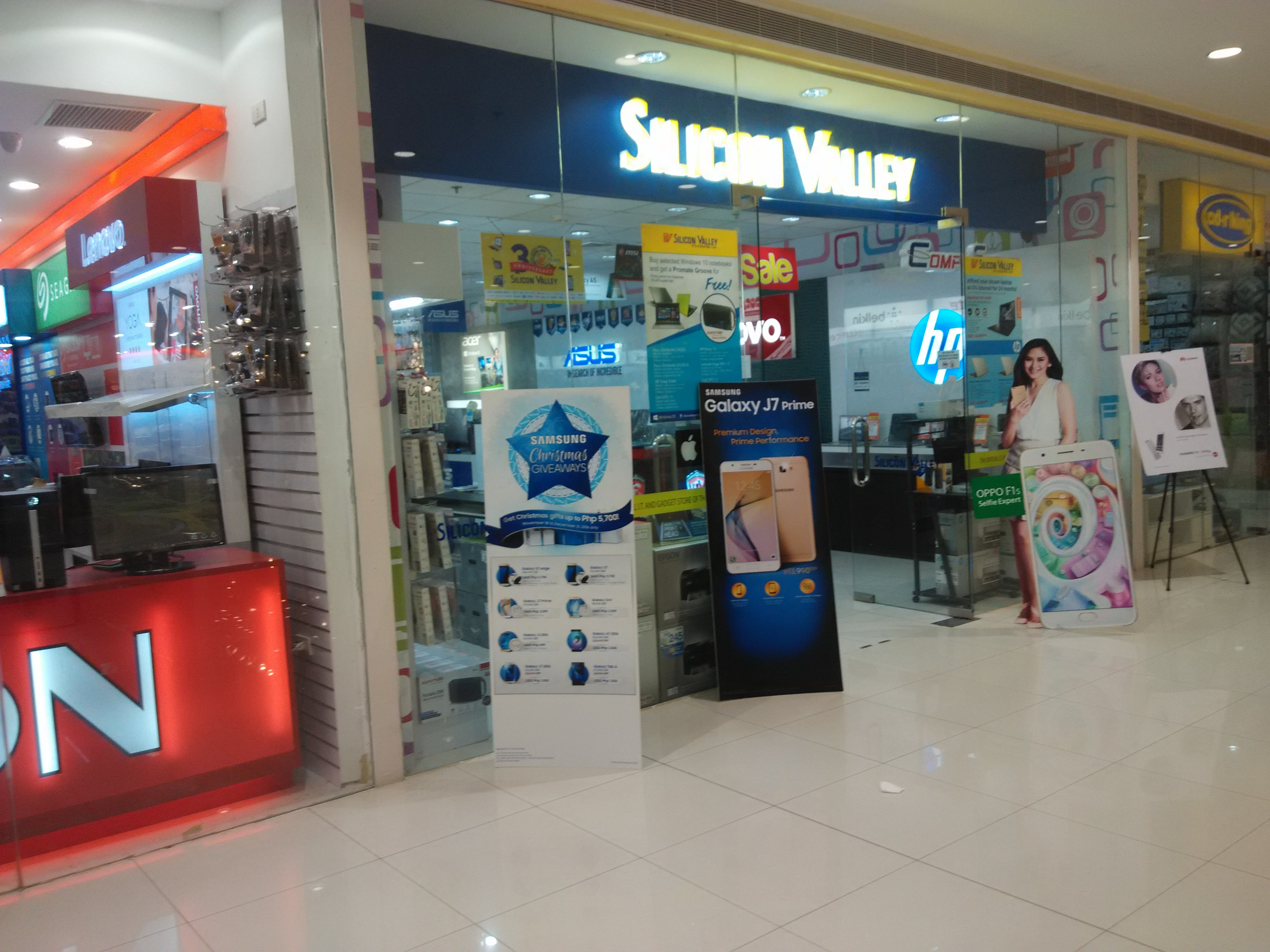
A Silicon Valley branch in KCC Mall De Zamboanga

Silicon Valley started a computer rental service on December 15, 1985. They were the first in the Philippines to sell computer supplies by pieces instead of selling it by sets. With their prospering business for eleven years, in 1996, the company moved its corporate office at San Francisco Del Monte, Quezon City, Philippines and started to expand branches, nationwide.

In 1997, First International Computer (FIC), a Taiwanese-based manufacturer of computer motherboards, appointed Silicon Valley as their distributor in the Philippines. It then followed by Hewlett-Packard which the appointed Silicon Valley as their Accredited Commercial Reseller (ACR), Dealer Premier Support Partner (DPSP) and Accredited Service Provider (ASP).

Silicon Valley has expanded to a chain of retail stores focused on computer sets, parts, and accessories. Gadgets such as smartphones, tablets, digital cameras, video recorders, and printing supplies were later introduced in their product lineup.

Silicon Valley together with Asianic Distributors brought Lenovo in the Philippines by having the first Lenovo Concept store at The Cyberzone, SM Mall of Asia followed by seven other stores within Metro Manila. It was after Lenovo bought International Business Machines Corporation's PC divisions in 2005. By that time, PCs with brands IdeaPad and ThinkPad PCs, ThinkServer systems and ThinkVision monitors, and as well as Lenovo computer accessories were readily available at the concept store. The concept store also offers PC repairs and technical support for Lenovo products.

In 2010, Silicon Valley was offered by Globe Telecoms in providing communication tools with mobile postpaid lines, wired direct lines and broadband internet connections. This has increased the efficiency of Silicon Valley's operations.

In 2016, Promate Philippines partnered with Silicon Valley in selling their products.

The growth of Silicon Valley expanded with developments of retail shopping malls in the country by adding more of their branches inside the country's major retail malls like SM Malls, Ayala Malls, and KCC Malls. They have 51 branches of which 29 of those are their showrooms, nationwide.

== See also ==
- CD-R King
- Octagon Computer Superstore
