= Octagon Computer Superstore =

Computer retail store in the Philippines

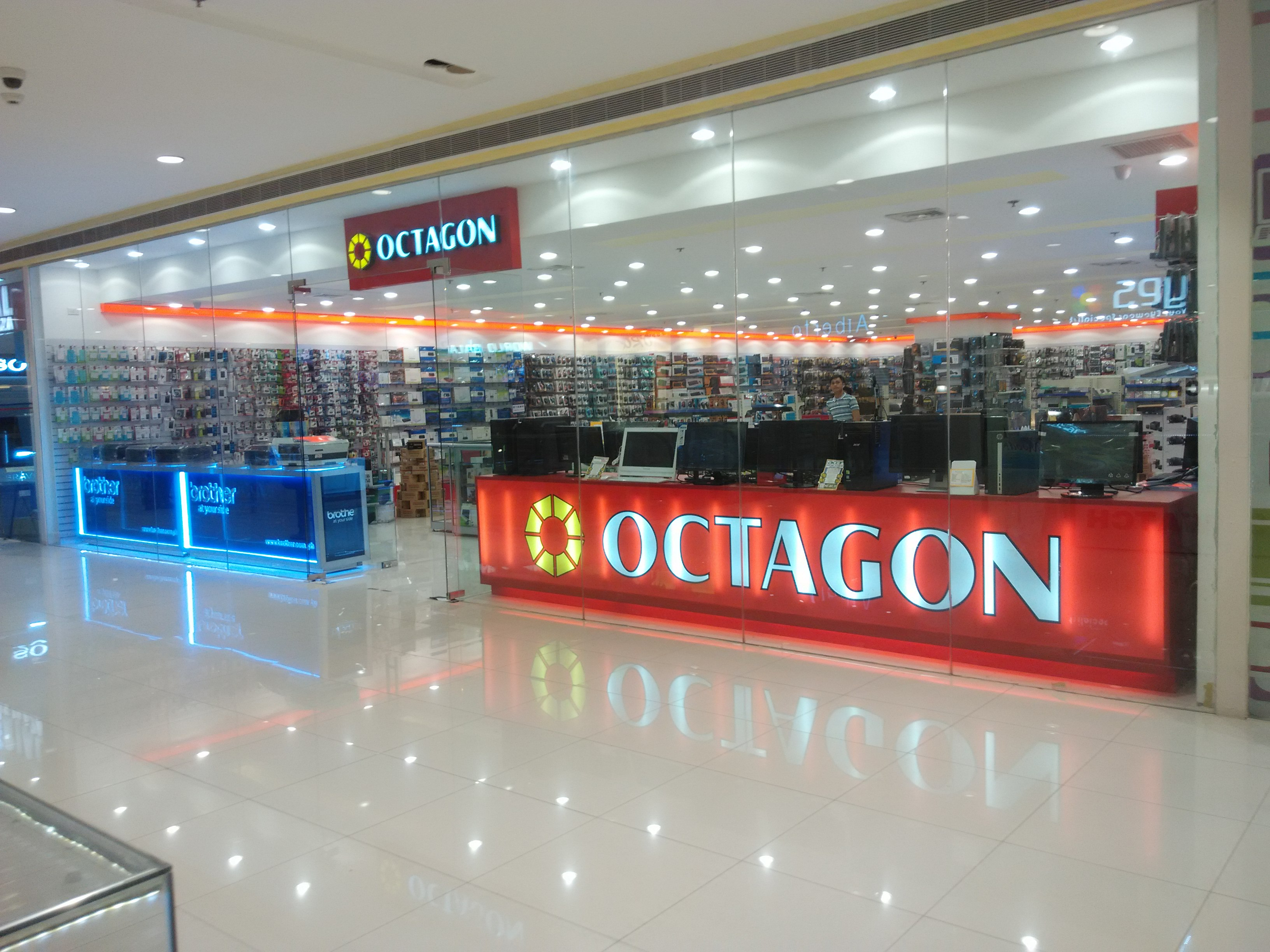
- Octagon Computer Superstore branch at KCC Mall de Zamboanga
- Company type: Private
- Industry: Retail
- Founded: 1982
- Headquarters: 747 Romualdez Cor. Zobel St. Ermita, Manila, Philippines
- Area served: Philippines
- Products: Consumer electronics
- Number of employees: 1000
- Subsidiaries: MicroValley & Gadget King
- Website: Octagon Official Website

Octagon Computer Superstore is a computer retail store in the Philippines. It has 150 branches nationwide along with their subsidiary, Micro Valley Computer Center with headquarters at 747 Romualdez Street, corner Zobel Street, Ermita, Manila. The store offers information technology products, mainly computers and components, laptops, smartphones and tablets and the like.

== History ==
Octagon Computer Superstore started in 1982 as an IT products retailer. They mainly sell computer sets, accessories and components. It then grew from a being an IT products retailer with a lone store in Manila to a chain of computer retail stores with branches nationwide.

From 1990s to 2010, Octagon became a reselling partner to various computer component manufacturers such as Acer, Hewlett-Packard, Logitech, and Seagate. With high sales, the company was given citations such as the Acer's Excellent Major Account Development Award in 1995 and Cisco's Retail Store of the Year in 2009.

Upon attaining nationwide reach, Octagon opened their subsidiary store, Micro Valley Computer Center, with several branches in Cabanatuan, Davao, Dumaguete and Manila. Micro Valley are focused more on computer parts and accessories, and also offers extended computer repair service. Meanwhile, from IT products, Octagon expanded their product range to computer accessories, gadgets, Android phones and tablets, and digital printers.

In 2012, Octagon became the official Philippine retail partner of Antec, an American computer component manufacturer.

Octagon Computer Superstore remains to be the predominant computer retailer company in the Philippines with 151 branches versus its rivals Silicon Valley Computer Group Philippines with 51 branches and Gaisano Interpace Computer Systems with 20 branches.

== Branches ==
Octagon now has 150 branches nationwide with around 1,000 employees. Across the country, they are commonly seen in major malls like SM Malls, KCC Malls, Robinson's Malls, and Gaisano Malls. Octagon Computer Superstore and Micro Valley Computer Center has stand-alone branches in Manila, Zamboanga, Dumaguete, Vigan, Batangas, Butuan, Cagayan de Oro, Dipolog and Davao.

== See also ==
- CD-R King
- Silicon Valley
