= Jarius Bondoc =

Filipino investigative journalist

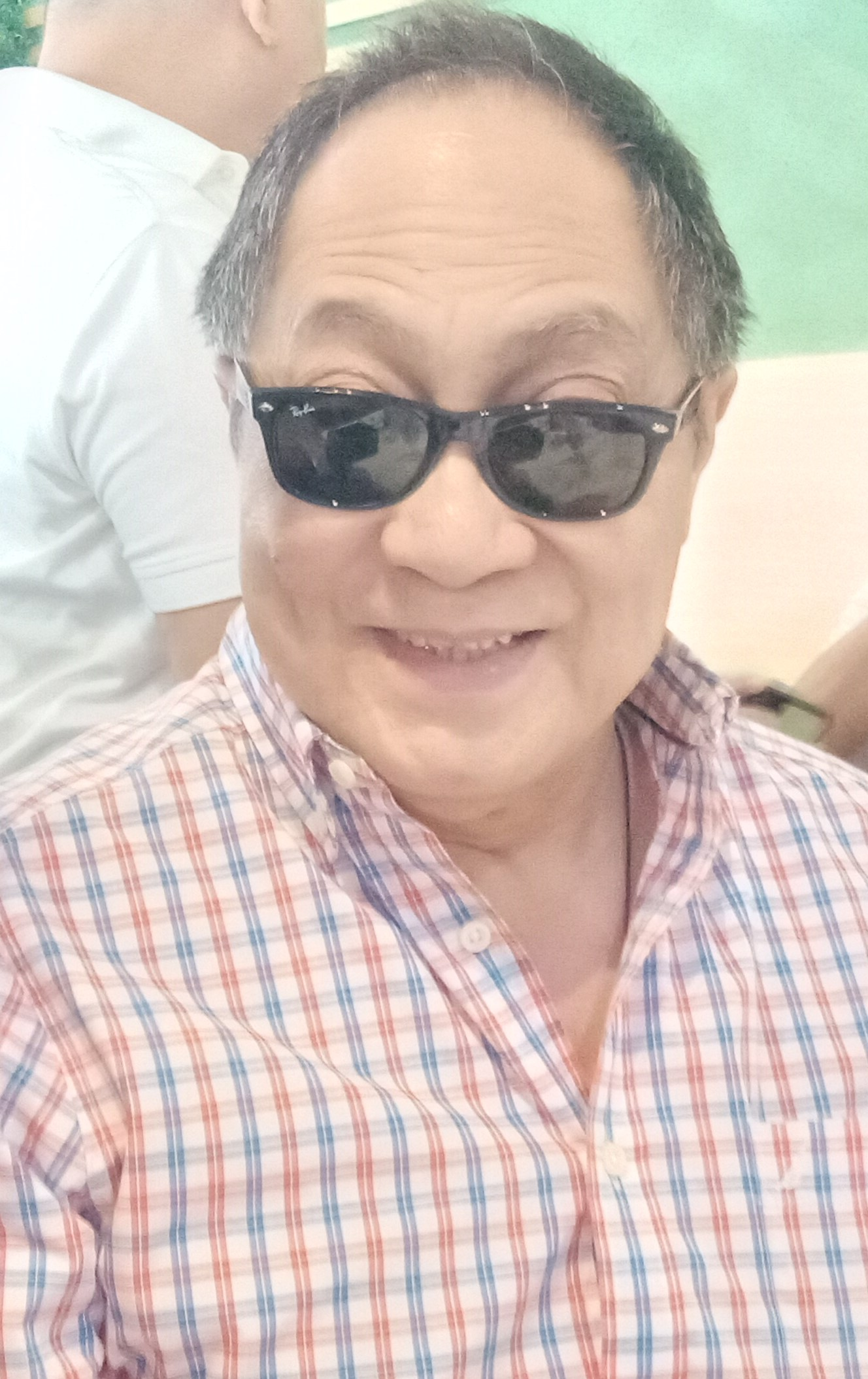
Bondoc in 2025

Jarius Ymzon Bondoc is a Filipino investigative journalist. He is a long-time columnist for the Philippine Star's broadsheet and tabloid.

== Biography ==
Bondoc was a martial law victim and a UP Sigma Kappa Pi alumnus.

His op-ed articles, according to a Sandiganbayan decision, give a fair commentary on an issue that is imbued with the public interest.

He hosts a Saturday radio program on DWIZ 882, apart from writing two columns for the Philippine Star and the Pilipino Star Ngayon.

Following Bondoc's decades of fearless comments and exposés, death threats were reportedly sent to him and his family.

== Awards and honors ==
- 2019 Men Who Matter, PeopleAsia
- 2018 Apolinario Mabini Award, National Press Club
- 2013 Journalist of the Year, Metrobank Foundation

== Publications ==
Bondoc is the author of books on investigative journalism and politics and society in the Philippines, including Exposes: Investigative Reporting for Clean Government (Anvil, 2012) and Gotcha: An Exposé on the Philippine Government (GE Manaog, 2021)
