= Betty Go-Belmonte =

Founder of STAR Group of Publications

- 吳友德
- Born: Billie Mary Chua Go; December 31, 1933; Santa Mesa, Manila, Insular Government of the Philippine Islands, United States
- Died: January 28, 1994 (aged 60); Quezon City, Philippines
- Resting place: Loyola Memorial Park - Marikina, Philippines
- Education: University of the Philippines Diliman (BA); Claremont Graduate School (MA)
- Occupations: Journalist, newspaper publisher
- Employer: STAR Group of Companies
- Known for: Co-founder, Philippine Daily Inquirer, The Philippine Star and Pilipino Star Ngayon
- Spouse: Feliciano Belmonte Jr. (m. 1959)
- Children: 4, including Joy

Billie Mary "Betty" Chua Go-Belmonte (Chinese: 吳友德; Pe̍h-ōe-jī: Gô͘ Iú-tek; pinyin: Wú Yǒudé; December 31, 1933 – January 28, 1994) was a Filipina journalist and newspaper publisher. In late 1985, she co-founded the Philippine Daily Inquirer. By 1986, she established both The Philippine Star newspaper and the Pilipino Star Ngayon tabloid. Her STAR Group of Publications later began publishing newspapers such as The Freeman, the tabloids Pang-Masa and Banat, as well as the magazines Starweek, People Asia, and The Fookien Times Yearbook.

A street and a Manila LRT Line 2 station were named after her.

== Early life ==
Belmonte was the eldest child of Jaime Go Puan Seng (1906–1987), founder of the Filipino-Chinese newspaper The Fookien Times, and Felisa Velasco Chua (1911–2002), the daughter of a merchant family, both of Chinese descent. She had four younger sisters namely Cecile (1936–2004), Dorcy (1938–1999), Elsie (1941–2009) and Gracie (1946–) as well as a younger brother, Andrew (1951–). She grew up with a devout Protestant upbringing in the Santa Mesa district of Manila, as well as in the Kamias district of Quezon City. When she was eight years old, her family moved to the foothills of the Sierra Madre mountains, near Ipo Dam, to escape persecution from advancing Japanese forces during World War II, where they lived in poverty.

== Education ==
After the war, Betty and her siblings took their elementary studies at Kamuning Public School and Hope Christian High School, and their high school studies at the Philippine Christian Colleges and UP High School. She was often teased at school for having a boy's name, so her father started calling her Betty. When she was 19, she wanted to become a Protestant missionary and stay single. This upset her grandmother, who wanted her to marry. In college, she wanted to be a painter and pursue a course in Fine Arts but her father thought she would not be able to make a living as a painter and enrolled her in an English degree at the University of the Philippines Diliman instead. There, she became a member of the Sigma Delta Phi sorority.

In UP, Betty Go experienced prejudice for being a Filipino of Chinese ancestry. Despite being born in the Philippines and having a local-born mother, because of her father's dual citizenship and emigrant status, she was treated a dual citizen unfairly as well by (native) Filipino students. Henceforth, she decided to join student organizations and activities, as well as, ran and won in the student elections to prove that a person of Filipino of Chinese ancestry can run and hold office.

After finishing college, Go attended Claremont Graduate School for her master's degree in English and American literature.

== Career ==
Betty Go's father, Jaime Go Puan Seng, founded The Fookien Times in 1927, which was once the biggest Filipino-Chinese newspaper in the Philippines. During the 1930s, the newspaper was known for exposing government anomalies and corruption, which led to libel lawsuits being filed against her father. He was acquitted and his case became the basis for the establishment of Philippine libel laws.

Her father regarded her as a potential successor in managing the newspaper. After completing a master's degree abroad, she joined the company as an editorial assistant, where she worked on proofreading articles and gained experience in newspaper management and publishing.

=== Martial law ===
During the administration of Ferdinand Marcos, The Fookien Times was one of newspapers critical of the government. After Marcos' declaration of Martial Law in 1972, the newspaper was one of several newspapers forced to close by the government. Go Puan Seng went on a self-imposed exile in Canada after the newspaper ceased publication. Belmonte, who was by then already married to Feliciano Belmonte, Jr., remained in the Philippines despite threats from Imelda Marcos that she will kick them out of the country. She continued writing through her weekly Dear Billie advice column in the Daily Express newspaper.

In the early 1980s, when Marcos eased restrictions on publications, Belmonte started a small monthly magazine called The Star, a predecessor of The Philippine STAR. It was one of several opposition magazines and tabloids, like Mr & Ms Special Edition, Panorama, We Forum, and Tempo, that were critical of the Marcos administration, dubbed the mosquito press.

On December 9, 1985, following the demand for a credible and independent broadsheet, Belmonte, together with Mr & Ms publisher, Eugenia Apostol, and columnist Maximo Soliven, founded the Philippine Daily Inquirer which would become the leading Philippine broadsheet at that time.

=== The Philippine STAR ===
After the EDSA Revolution that toppled Ferdinand Marcos and restored democracy in the Philippines, questions finances and divergence of priorities caused a rift among Inquirer's publishers that led Belmonte and Soliven to leave the newspaper and to establish their own broadsheet. Belmonte was perceived as affecting the newspaper's credibility and was asked to leave. She left the newspaper even as its publishers owed her money which was used to put up Inquirer.

On March 17, 1986, Belmonte established her own Filipino tabloid newspaper, Ang Pilipino Ngayon. It would grow in circulation to become the leading Filipino tabloid in the Philippines. A few months later, on July 28, 1986, Belmonte, Soliven, and Art Borjal established the national broadsheet The Philippine STAR that would compete against Inquirer and Manila Bulletin. Under Belmonte's chairmanship, STAR would later on surpass the two broadsheets to become the most widely circulated newspaper in the Philippines, distinguished for its balanced, objective, and fair reporting.

== Philanthropy ==
As chairman of STAR, Belmonte was active in various corporate social responsibility activities. In the STAR's maiden issue, the day's biggest news was the death of 23-year-old Stephen Salcedo at the hands of Marcos loyalists, just because he was wearing yellow. The headline screamed, "Wear yellow and die," and was accompanied by photos of the mob beating Salcedo to death. For several days, the paper closely followed the story and, through photos, those responsible were eventually caught.

The story touched Belmonte so much that she extended financial (from donations solicited through her column "Pebbles") and emotional support to Salcedo's widow and children. This laid the foundation of Operation Damayan, the STAR's corporate social responsibility arm, which was formed in 1989 and would help thousands of communities in the Philippines during natural disasters and calamities.

Belmonte was also involved in other civic associations. She was president of the Quezon City Associated Ladies Foundation, Inc., governor of the Philippine National Red Cross, director of the UP Alumni Association, and trustee of the UP Foundation and the Sigma Delta Phi Foundation, Inc. In 1993, Belmonte was awarded the Gintong Ina award for her contributions to media and journalism.

== Personal life and death ==
Belmonte was married to Feliciano Belmonte, Jr. from 1959 until her death. The couple had four children, namely Isaac, Kevin, Miguel, and Joy. Their three sons hold editorial and managerial positions at The Philippine STAR, and its sister publications like Pilipino Star Ngayon, Pang Masa, and The Freeman. Her daughter Joy is the incumbent mayor of Quezon City.

Belmonte was a devout Protestant, instructing the staff of The Philippine Star to forfeit the Sunday issue in its first two years of existence to avoid working on the Sabbath.

She died in Quezon City on January 28, 1994, due to bone cancer, 27 days after her 60th birthday.
