= Pilipino Star Ngayon =

Filipino tabloid

Pilipino Star NGAYON
- Diyaryong Disente ng Masang Intelihente
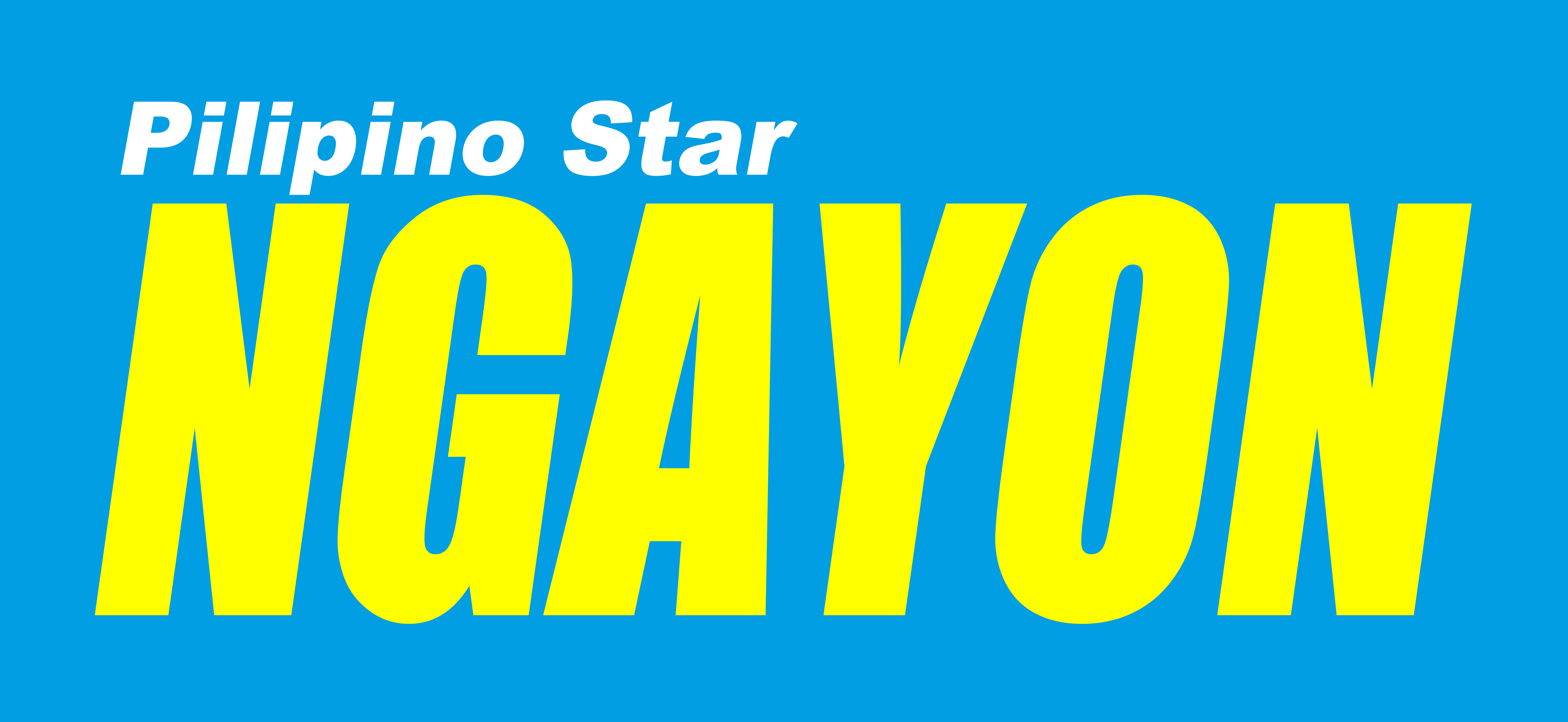

- Front page from March 29, 2018
- Type: Daily newspaper
- Format: Tabloid
- Owner(s): Philstar Daily, Inc. MediaQuest Holdings (51%); Belmonte Family (21%); Private stock (28%)
- Founder: Betty Go-Belmonte
- Publisher: Pilipino Star NGAYON, Inc.
- President: Miguel G. Belmonte
- Managing editor: Rowena S. del Prado
- News editor: Rowena del Prado
- Opinion editor: Ronnie M. Halos
- Founded: March 17, 1986
- Political alignment: Independent
- Language: Filipino
- Headquarters: The Philippine STAR Building, Amvel Business Park, Dr. A Santos Avenue, Sucat, Parañaque City, Metro Manila, Philippines
- City: Manila
- Country: Philippines
- Circulation: 502,083 (2012)
- Sister newspapers: The Philippine STAR; BusinessWorld; Pang-Masa; The Freeman; Banat
- Website: philstar.com/ngayon

Pilipino Star Ngayon, self-styled as Pilipino Star NGAYON and first known as Ang Pilipino Ngayon, is the a tabloid newspaper of daily nationwide circulation in the Philippines. It is written and published in Filipino, the national language of the Philippines. The tabloid newspaper is owned and operated by PhilStar Daily, Inc., under its subsidiary, Pilipino Star NGAYON, Inc.

== History ==
Like its sister publication The Philippine STAR, Pilipino Star NGAYON was established a few months after the EDSA People Power Revolution that toppled the dictator Ferdinand Marcos and propelled Corazon Aquino to the Philippine presidency. Journalist and newspaper publisher Betty Go-Belmonte, along with Fr. Jose C. Blanco, SJ and Tess Ramiro of the Catholic civic group Center for Active Non-violence, met a few weeks after the revolution to discuss the establishment of an affordable Filipino-language tabloid newspaper that the masses can read. Belmonte envisioned the paper to be reading public's "guiding star" by providing credible news and information, intelligent opinions and family-friendly content, unlike the usual smut featured in most Filipino tabloid newspapers at the time.

On March 17, 1986, the first issue of the tabloid was published, first as Ang Pilipino Ngayon, which was eventually changed to Pilipino Star Ngayon in the early '90s following the publication of its sister newspaper, The Philippine Star. It caters primarily to lower income or masa readers in the country, providing them intelligent news and opinion with decent presentation, hence its motto, "Diyaryong Disente ng Masang Intelihente" (Decent Newspaper of the Intelligent Masses).

With the death of publisher Betty Go-Belmonte in 1994, her son Miguel took over as president of the newspaper. In 2015, the tabloid, along with its sister publication The Philippine Star, was among the print media acquired by entrepreneur Manny V. Pangilinan's MediaQuest Holdings, Inc. The company owns a 51-percent stake in the newspaper, while the Belmonte family retained 21 percent as well as management and editorial control over the newspaper.

=== Innovation ===
Pilipino Star NGAYON led the innovation in the tabloid newspaper industry in the Philippines. It is the first tabloid in the country to be published in full color and the first tabloid in the Philippines to establish a presence on the Internet.

=== Awards ===
In 2013 and 2014, Pilipino Star NGAYON was awarded "Newspaper of the Year" by Gawad Tanglaw (Gawad Tagapuring mga Akademisyan ng Aninong Gumagalaw), an award-giving body in the Philippines composed of critics, scholars, historians, and professors from different colleges and universities.

== Columnists ==
- Al Pedroche
- Dennis Antenor, Jr.
- Jarius Bondoc
- Wilson Lee Flores
- Ben Tulfo
- Korina Sanchez
- Atty. Jose C. Sison
- Deo Macalma
- Butch Quejada
- Dr. Tranquilino Elicaño, Jr.
- Dr. Willie Ong
- Ramon M. Bernardo
- Bening Batuigas
- Mer Layson
