= Magnolia (SMC brand) =

Brand owned by San Miguel Corporation

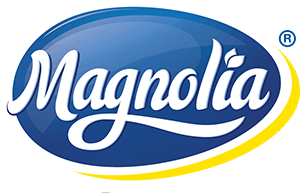
- Primary logo in use since 2015.
- Product type: Dairy products, margarine, cooking oil, chicken products, gelatin dessert, baking products, non-alcoholic beverages
- Current owner: San Miguel Corporation
- Produced by: San Miguel Food and Beverage
- Country: Philippines
- Introduced: 1925; 101 years ago
- Markets: Philippines
- Tagline: Celebrate Goodness Everyday
- Website: Magnolia on Facebook; magnolia.com.ph; magnoliaicecream.com.ph; magnoliachicken.com; magnoliahealthybeverages.com

Magnolia is a food and beverage brand owned by San Miguel Corporation (SMC) and used by its various subsidiaries. The brand was commercially established by SMC (then known as San Miguel Brewery) as an ice cream brand in 1925.

== History ==
The history of the Magnolia brand can be traced back to 1899 when an American by the name of William J. Schober arrived in the Philippines as a cook in the United States Army. After the Philippine–American War, Schober would remain in the Philippines and introduced the "magnolia pie", "magnolia ice cream" and "magnolia ice-drop". In 1925, Schober sold his "magnolia" business interests to SMC (then known as San Miguel Brewery). Schober would move on to establish Legaspi Garden Restaurant at Pier 7, Port Area, Manila (the location is now the headquarters of Philippine Coast Guard), behind the Manila Hotel.

Under SMC, the dairy plant at 526 Calle Aviles in the San Miguel district of Manila stood on the same street as the site of the original San Miguel brewery (6 Calle Aviles). In 1926, the dairy plant was relocated to Calle Echague (now Carlos Palanca Sr. Street) in Quiapo, Manila. In 1970, production was transferred to a new modern facility in Aurora Boulevard, Quezon City, known as the Magnolia Dairy Products Plant. The facility, designed by National Artist Leandro Locsin, also housed the main branch of its Magnolia ice cream parlor.

In 1972, SMC entered the poultry business with its first breeder farm in Cavite. The following year, SMC established its first chicken processing plant in Muntinlupa, Rizal to produce Magnolia Fresh Chicken. The poultry business, along with its B-Meg feeds business were operated as the Feeds and Livestock Division of SMC until it was spun-off as a new subsidiary (San Miguel Foods, Inc.) in 1991.

In 1981, SMC spun off its butter and margarine production to a new subsidiary named Philippine Dairy Products Corporation (now known as Magnolia, Inc.), a joint-venture with New Zealand Dairy Board, with its production facility based in the Aurora Boulevard plant.

In 1994, SMC transferred its ice cream and milk businesses to a new company, Magnolia-Nestlé Corporation, a joint-venture with Nestlé. SMC retained ownership of the Magnolia brand since it was also being used by other SMC products. SMC also retained ownership of the Aurora Boulevard property. In 1998, SMC withdrew from the Magnolia-Nestlé venture and a non-compete clause barred it from the ice cream and milk businesses for five years. Upon the expiration of the non-compete clause in 2004, SMC revived its ice cream and milk businesses through its subsidiary, Magnolia, Inc.

In 2008, SMC sold the Aurora Boulevard property to Robinsons Land Corporation (RLC), a subsidiary of JG Summit Holdings, Inc. News reports stated that the property was sold for ₱1.6 billion. The property was developed by RLC into a mall (Robinsons Magnolia) and residential condominiums (The Magnolia Residences). One of the mall’s first establishments was a Magnolia-franchised ice cream parlor named Magnolia Flavor House, which operated from 2012 to present, as a fitting homage to the property’s roots.

On May 19, 2010, Magnolia, Inc. inaugurated its main ice cream production facility in Santa Rosa, Laguna.

== Trademark dispute ==
In the United States, Ramar Foods International, a company founded in 1969 and based in Pittsburg, California, markets its own line of ice cream under the Magnolia trademark "since 1972" using a logo identical to that created and used by SMC. The company has no connection with SMC.

SMC currently exports its ice cream in the US and Canada under the San Miguel Gold Label brand and its line of butter, margarine and cheese to the US under the Magnolia brand. In a decision dated August 27, 2015, the Ninth Circuit U.S. Court of Appeals denied the appeal filed by Ramar on the March 2013 judgment of the U.S. District Court for the Central District of California in favor of SMC regarding the use of the Magnolia brand on its butter, margarine and cheese products. Additionally, the Court of Appeals had reversed the injunction issued by the District Court that prevented SMC from using the Magnolia brand for new Magnolia food products in the United States. It noted that Ramar had failed to prove that it suffered any irreparable injury by SMC's use of the Magnolia trademark on its products in the United States. In rendering the decision, the US Court of Appeals recognized that SMC was using the Magnolia brand on its butter, margarine and cheese products to invoke the goodwill that SMC had built in the Philippines, not the goodwill created by Ramar in the United States.
