= Procter & Gamble Philippines =

Philippine subsidiary of Procter & Gamble

Procter & Gamble Philippines, Inc.
- Secondary logo since 2013, concurrently used with the 2002 lettermark
- Trade name: P&G Philippines
- Formerly: The second incarnation of Philippine Manufacturing Company (1935–1964); Procter & Gamble PMC (1964–1989)
- Type: Subsidiary
- Industry: Consumer goods
- Predecessors: Manila Refining Company (1908–1913); The first incarnation of Philippine Manufacturing Company (1913–1935)
- Founded: 1935; 91 years ago
- Headquarters: 11/F Net Park Building, 5th Avenue, Crescent Park West, Bonifacio Global City, Taguig, Metro Manila, Philippines
- Area served: Philippines
- Key people: Agraj Sharma (President and CEO); Raffy Fajardo (General Manager)
- Products: Home and personal care; Consumer healthcare products
- Revenue: ▲ ₱864 million (2023)
- Number of employees: 5,000 (2024)
- Parent: Procter & Gamble
- Website: ph.pg.com

Procter & Gamble Philippines, Inc. (also known as P&G Philippines) is the Philippine subsidiary of American multinational consumer goods company Procter & Gamble. It is a manufacturer of laundry detergents and soaps, shampoos and hair conditioners, toothpastes, deodorants, skin care products, household cleaners, toilet soaps and consumer healthcare products. Since 2016, the company is based in Bonifacio Global City, Taguig.

Procter & Gamble Philippines serves as part of The Procter & Gamble Company to produce, manufacture and supervise P&G brands (like Safeguard, Head & Shoulders, Tide, Downy, Ariel, among others) in the Philippine market. To maintain the needs of mass production of most of the products, the company also imports P&G products from neighboring countries such as Malaysia, Indonesia, Thailand, Vietnam and South Korea.

== History ==
Primary logo still used today on P&G branded products.

In 1935, P&G expanded its international presence with the acquisition of Philippine Manufacturing Company (PMC), making P&G Philippines, the company's first operational unit in the Far East and the second-oldest P&G subsidiary outside North America.

As part of expansion in 1964, Procter & Gamble merged with its Philippine counterpart to form the new company, Procter & Gamble PMC and adopted the Moon and Stars logo until 1989.

In 1989, Procter & Gamble PMC was renamed as Procter & Gamble Philippines. Originally displayed as its original plant in Tondo, Manila, and continues to be displayed in Cabuyao, Laguna.

== Brands ==
=== Current brands ===
- Ambi Pur (acquired from Sara Lee Philippines in 2010)
- Ariel
- Dolo-Neurobion
- Downy
- Gillette
- Gillette Venus
- Head & Shoulders
- Herbal Essences
- Joy
- Neurobion
- Olay
- Old Spice
- Oral-B
- Pantene
- Safeguard
- Secret
- Sangobion
- Tide
- Vicks

=== Former brands ===
- Ace
- Ascend
- Bonux (discontinued in 2019)
- Camay
- Crest
- Dari Creme (sold to San Miguel Corporation in 1994, under the Magnolia brand)
- Duracell
- Fit
- Fresco
- Gain
- Glendale
- Ivory
- Luto
- Mayon
- Mr. Clean (discontinued in 2010, changed into Bonux for the Philippine market, then the latter discontinued in 2018)
- Ola & Agro
- Pampers
- Perla (sold to SCPG Asia Pacific in 2016)
- Prell
- Pringles (sold to Monde Nissin in 2017, under license from Kellogg's)
- Purico
- Rejoice
- Star (sold to San Miguel Corporation in 1994, under the Magnolia brand)
- Sunshine
- Victor & Venus
- Vidal Sassoon
- Whisper
- Zest

== See also ==
- List of companies of the Philippines
