= Aurora Boulevard =

Road in Metro Manila, Philippines

Coordinates: 14°37′11″N 121°2′45″E

R-6 Aurora Boulevard

- The route of Aurora Boulevard in Metro Manila. Aurora Boulevard is highlighted in red.

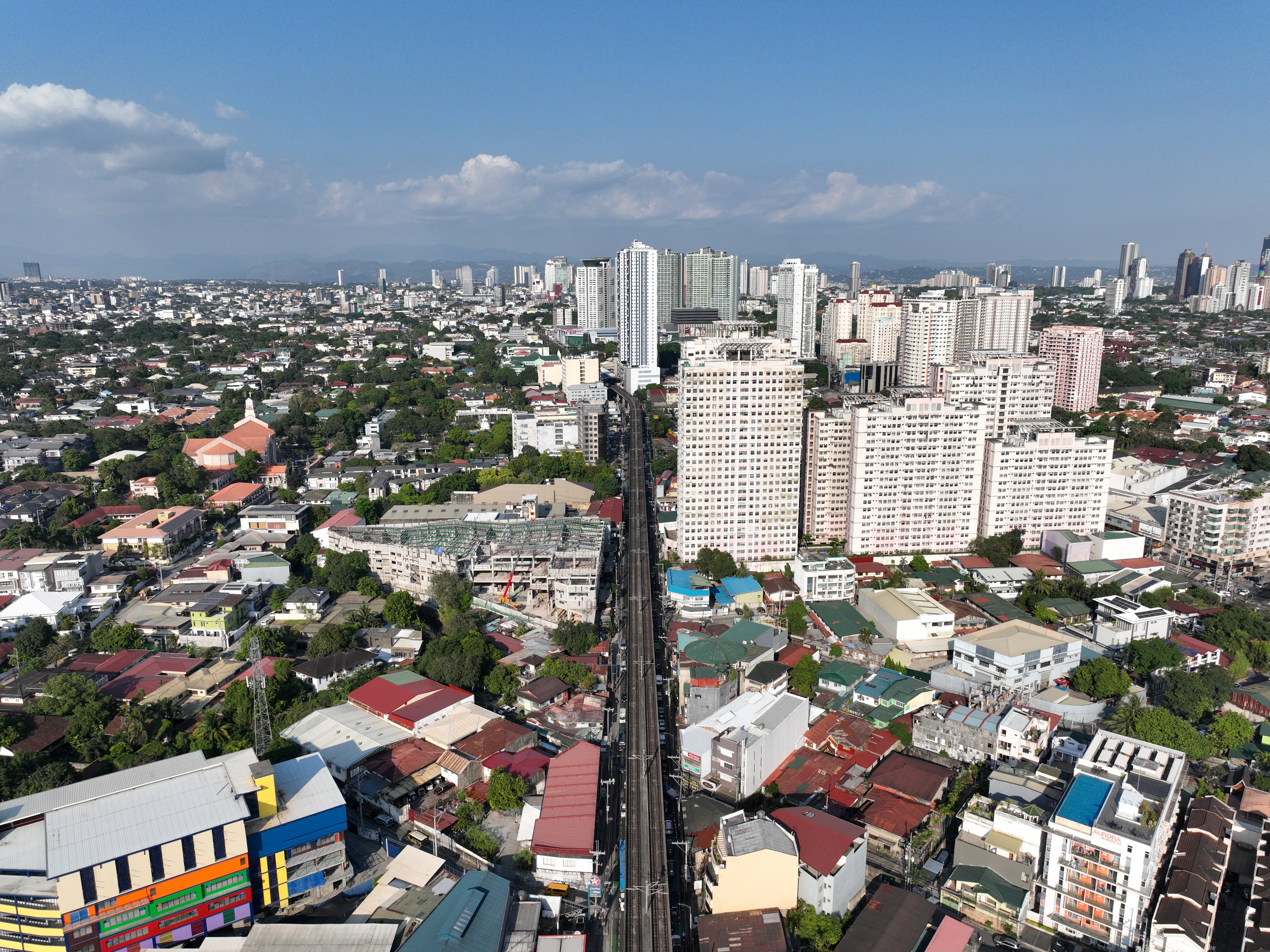
- Aerial view of Aurora Boulevard in San Juan (2026)

Route information
- Component highways: R-6 R-6; N59 from EDSA to Katipunan Avenue; N180 from G. Araneta Avenue to EDSA

Major junctions
- West end: N130 (Gregorio Araneta Avenue) / N180 (Magsaysay Boulevard) in Quezon City
- N184 (Gilmore Avenue); AH26 (Epifanio de los Santos Avenue)
- East end: N11 (Katipunan Avenue) / N59 (Marcos Highway) in Quezon City

Location
- Country: Philippines
- Major cities: Quezon City and San Juan

Highway system
- Roads in the Philippines; Highways; Expressways; List

Aurora Boulevard is a four-to-ten-lane major thoroughfare in Quezon City and San Juan in Metro Manila, Philippines. It is named after Doña Aurora Quezon, the consort of Commonwealth President Manuel Luis Quezon. It is one of the major roads in the commercial district of Araneta City in Cubao. LRT Line 2 follows the alignment of the boulevard.

== Route description ==
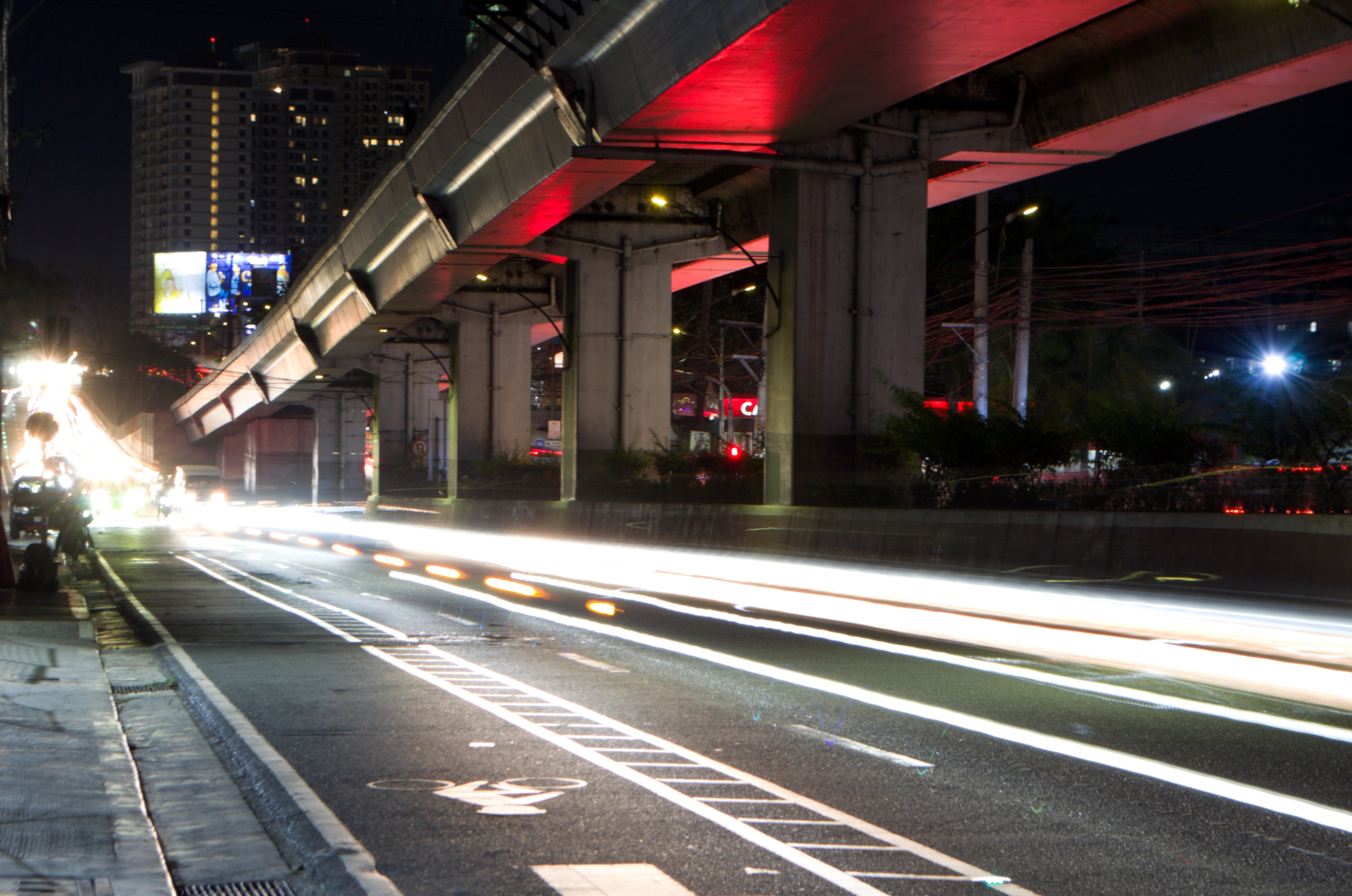
The boulevard at night

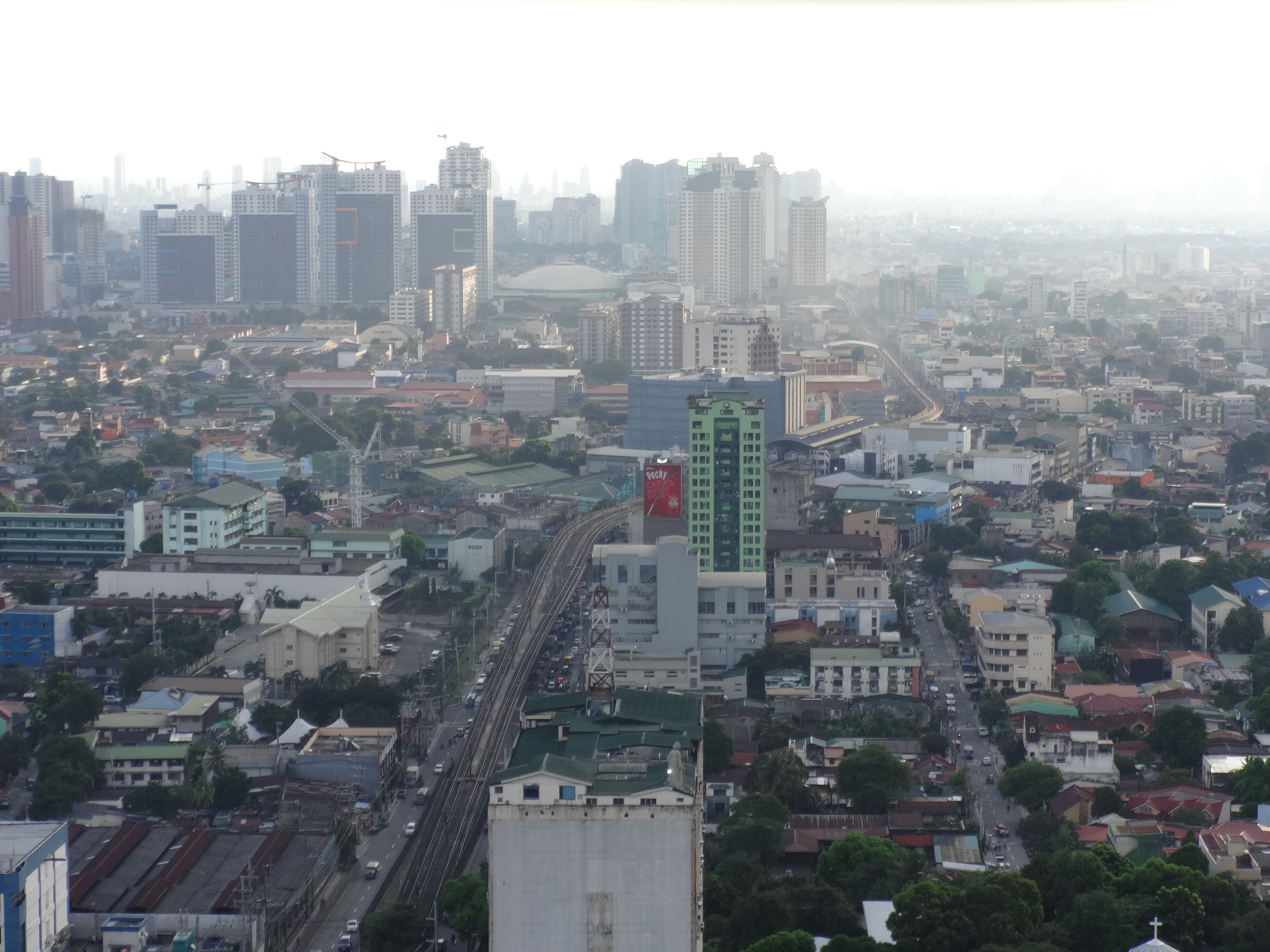
Cubao and Loyola Heights

Aurora Boulevard is divided into two routes: the segment from G. Araneta Avenue to EDSA and EDSA to Katipunan Avenue (C-5). Most of the road is a 4-lane dual carriageway, with LRT Line 2 having five stations above ground and one (Katipunan station) located underground.

Aurora Boulevard starts as a physical extension of Ramon Magsaysay Boulevard past the intersection with Araneta Avenue near the Manila–Quezon City boundary. It then enters San Juan before crossing Ermitaño Creek near Broadway Centrum to return to Quezon City, this time at the New Manila district. It then intersects Gilmore Avenue, Balete Drive, and E. Rodriguez Sr. Avenue before it meets EDSA.

Past EDSA, it passes near the Araneta City Complex in Cubao. The road continues eastward through the barangays of Silangan, Quirino 3-A, and Duyan-Duyan until it ends at Katipunan Avenue (C-5) near the Quezon City–Marikina boundary. It continues eastward to Rizal province as Marikina-Infanta Highway (commonly known as Marcos Highway).

The entire road and its continuations have Class II paint-separated one-way bike lanes as part of the national government's Metropolitan Bike Lane Network. The segments within Quezon City are integrated with the city's bike lane network, with the segment from EDSA to Katipunan Avenue having 0.6-meter (2.0 ft) painted buffer zones on both sides of the bicycle lanes.

== History ==
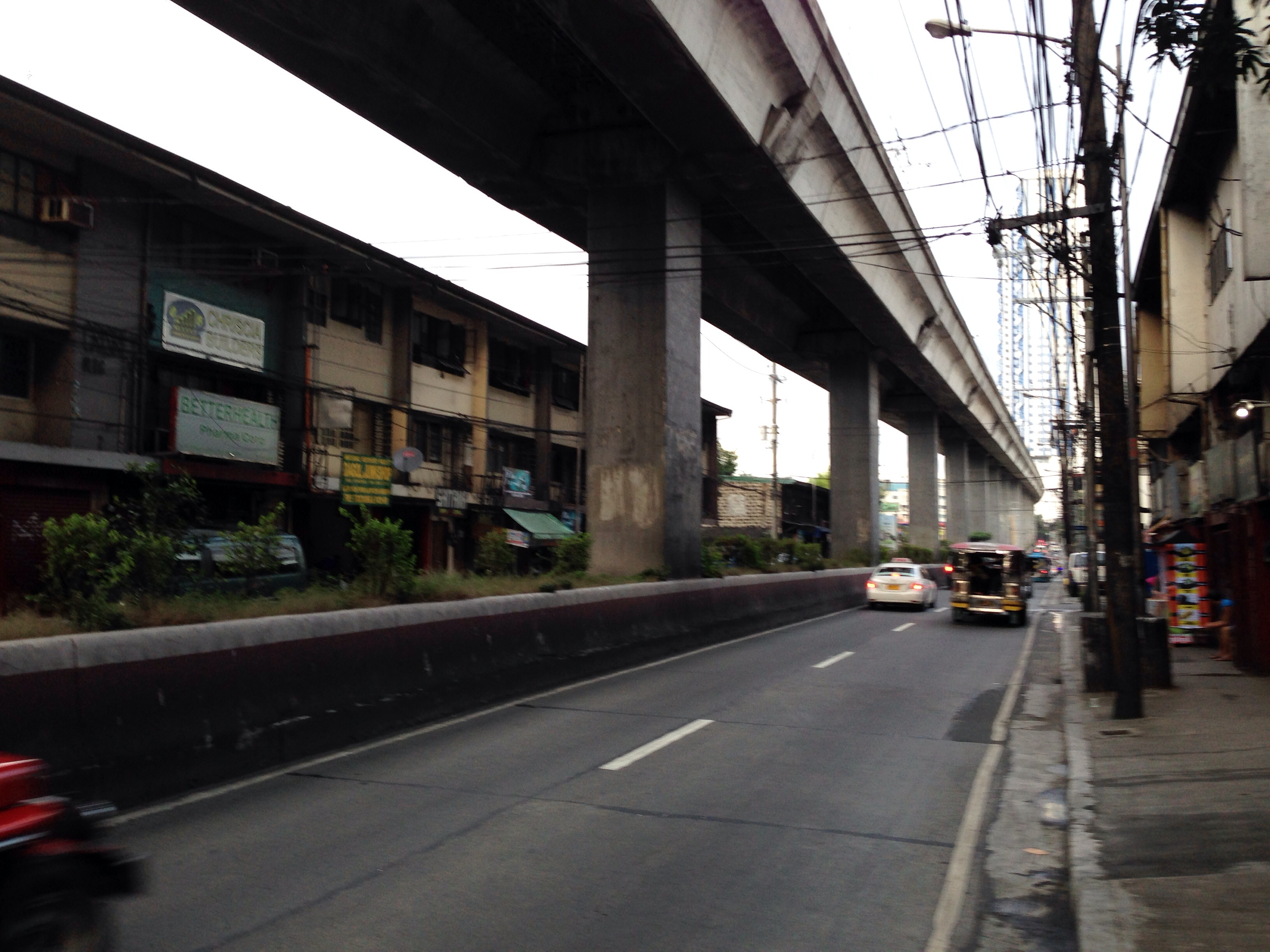
Eastbound lane of Aurora Boulevard in northern San Juan

The boulevard's origins can be traced back to the Camino de Mariquina (Marikina Road, also called San Juan-Marikina Road), a small road built in 1900 to link Manila to the western Manila province (later annexed to Rizal in 1901) municipalities of San Juan del Monte (San Juan) and Mariquina (Marikina). The road was named Calle N. Domingo (now N. Domingo Street) after Nicolas Domingo, a relator (court reporter) of the Real Audiencia of Manila in 1898.

Before 1945, Calle Santa Mesa (Santa Mesa Boulevard, now Magsaysay Boulevard) was extended eastwards from its intersection with Santol Street, crossing the San Juan River and absorbing majority of Calle Morales in San Juan and 2nd Street in New Manila Subdivision, Quezon City. The extension was classified as part of Highway 53 and was named the Santa Mesa Boulevard Extension. It was named Calle Morales after the old street in San Juan that it absorbed. Eventually, the Santa Mesa Boulevard Extension intersects with N. Domingo Street, whose remaining sections from present-day EDSA to present-day Katipunan Avenue were absorbed by the extension.

By 1955, the Santa Mesa Boulevard Extension was known as Marikina-Ermita Avenue (or the Manila Provincial Road). In 1963, the road was renamed Aurora Boulevard (as it is known today) to honor the former First Lady Aurora Quezon, the assassinated wife of former Philippine President Manuel L. Quezon. The Magnolia Ice Cream House ice cream parlor and factory once stood at the corner of Aurora Boulevard and Doña Hemady Street. It is now occupied by Robinsons Magnolia, which got its name from the former ice cream parlor and factory.

== Intersections ==
Province	City/Municipality	km	mi	Destinations	Notes
Quezon City		6	3.7	N130 (Gregorio Araneta Avenue)	Traffic light intersection. No left turn from westbound. Continues westward to Santa Mesa as N180 (Magsaysay Boulevard).
Quezon City				Guirayan Avenue	Westbound access only.
Quezon City–San Juan boundary				Lambingan Bridge over San Juan River	
San Juan				H. Lozada/S. Veloso Streets	Traffic light intersection. No left turn from both directions
San Juan		7	4.3	J. Ruiz Street	Unsignaled intersection.
San Juan				F. Santos Street	Eastbound only.
San Juan–Quezon City boundary				Ermitaño Bridge over Ermitaño Creek	
Quezon City				Broadway Avenue / Valencia Street	Traffic light intersection, no left turn from westbound. Access to Broadway Centrum.
Quezon City		8	5.0	N184 (Gilmore Avenue)	Traffic light intersection. Access to Greenhills Shopping Center and St. Paul University. No left turn from both directions.
Quezon City		8	5.0	Doña Hemady Street	Traffic light intersection. No left turn from both directions.
Quezon City				Robinsons Magnolia Access Road	Eastbound only. Access to Robinsons Magnolia.
Quezon City				Balete Drive	Traffic light intersection. No left turn from both directions.
Quezon City				Seattle Street	Traffic light intersection.
Quezon City		9	5.6	Betty Go-Belmonte Street	Unsignaled intersection.
Quezon City				N. Domingo Street	Eastbound only. Unsignaled intersection.
Quezon City				C. Benitez Avenue	Eastbound only.
Quezon City				Eulogio Rodriguez Sr. Avenue	No eastbound exit.
Quezon City				AH26 (EDSA)	Traffic light intersection. Route number changes from N180 to N59.
Quezon City				General Santos Street	Eastbound only. Access to Araneta City.
Quezon City				General Araneta Street / Annapolis Street	Unsignaled intersection. Access to Araneta City.
Quezon City		10	6.2	General Aguinaldo Avenue / Imperial Street	Traffic light intersection. Access to Araneta City.
Quezon City				Times Square Avenue / Cambridge Street	Traffic light intersection.
Quezon City				Oxford Street	Westbound only.
Quezon City				General Romulo Avenue / Yale Street	Traffic light intersection. General Romulo Avenue leads to Araneta City.
Quezon City				Stanford Street	Eastbound/westbound access only. Access from opposite directions via U-turn slots.
Quezon City				15th Avenue	Traffic light intersection.
Quezon City		11	6.8	20th Avenue	Eastbound only. Traffic light intersection.
Quezon City				Ermin Garcia Street	Westbound only.
Quezon City		11.5	7.1	Anonas Street	Traffic light intersection.
Quezon City				F. Castillo Street	Eastbound only. Traffic light intersection.
Quezon City		12	7.5	Supa Street / J.P. Rizal Street	Traffic light intersection. No traffic lights to and from Supa Street.
Quezon City				Emerald Street	Eastbound only. Access to Villa Aurora.
Quezon City		13	8.1	N11 (Katipunan Avenue)	Traffic light intersection. Continues eastward to Antipolo as N59 (Marcos Highway).
1.000 mi = 1.609 km; 1.000 km = 0.621 mi: Incomplete access; Route transition

== Landmarks ==
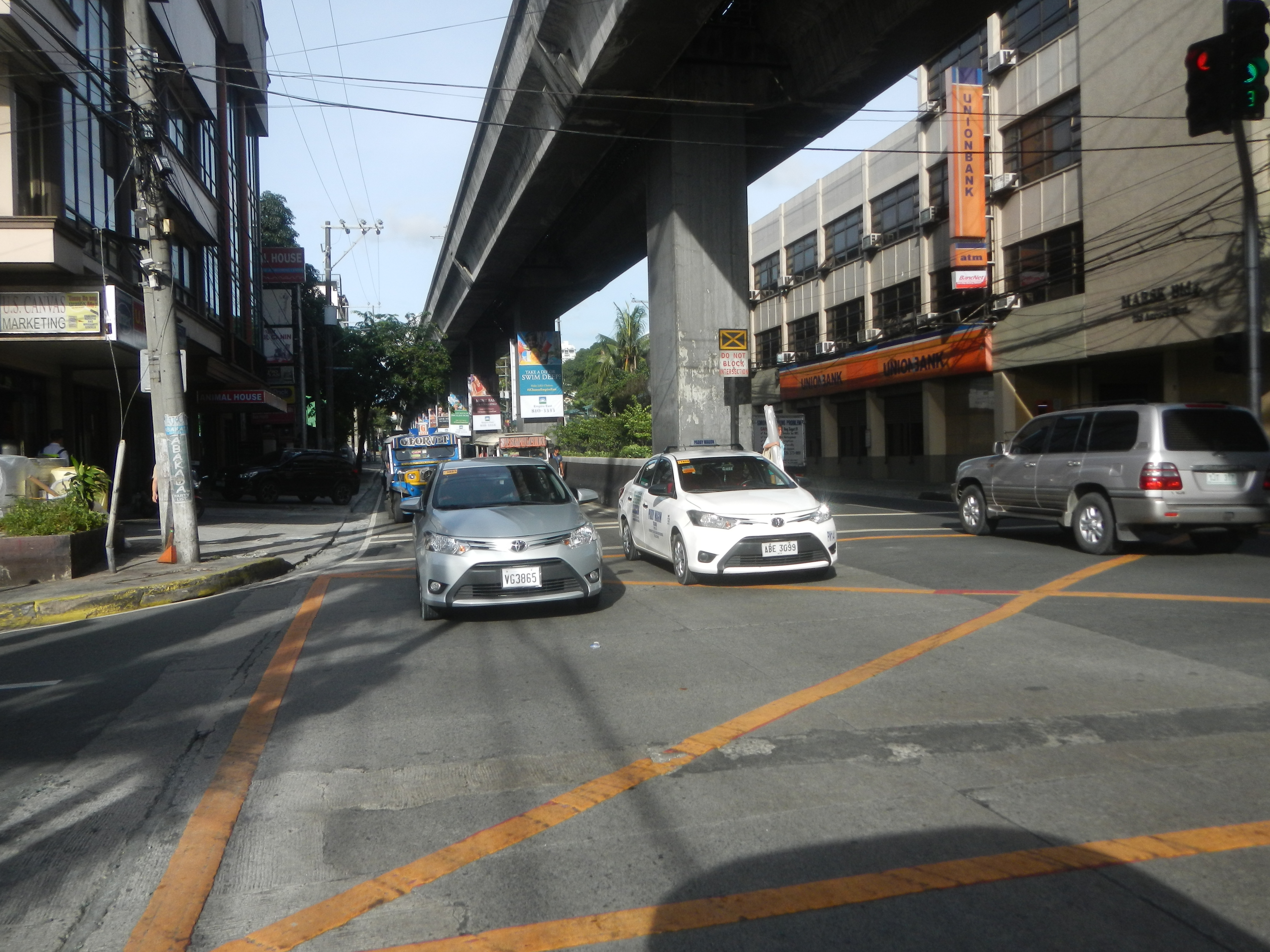
Westbound lane of Aurora Boulevard, at its intersection with Balete Drive in New Manila, Quezon City

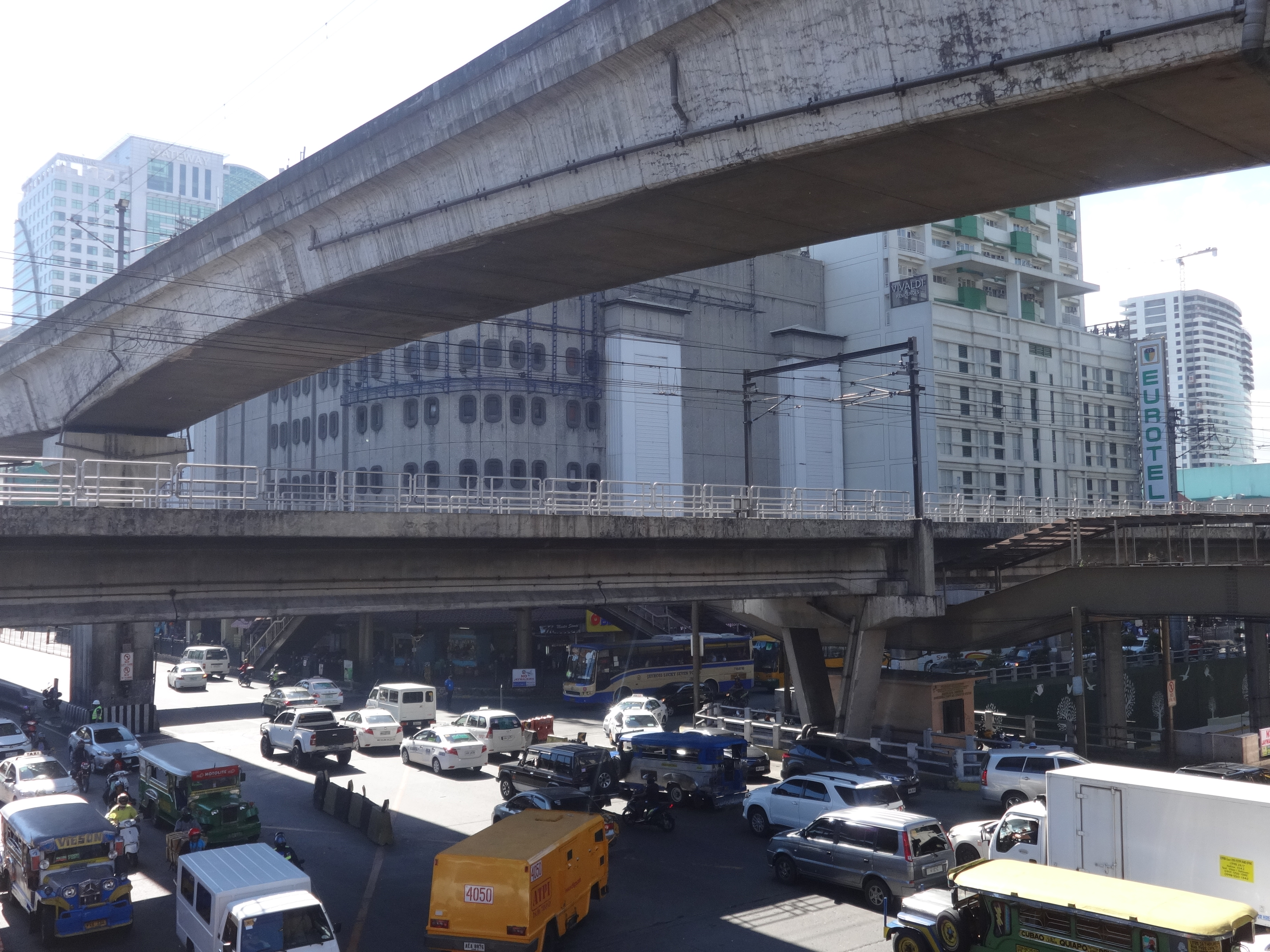
EDSA–Aurora Boulevard Intersection

This is from Gregorio Araneta Avenue in the west to Marikina–Infanta Highway in the east:

=== Quezon City ===
- Central Colleges of the Philippines
- Immaculate Heart of Mary College
- UERMMMC College of Medicine
- Lambingan Bridge (San Juan River)

=== San Juan ===
- J. Ruiz station
- Ermitaño Bridge (Ermitaño Creek)

=== Quezon City ===
- Broadway Centrum
- Gilmore station
- St. Paul University Quezon City
- Robinsons Magnolia
- Betty Go-Belmonte station
- ACT Theater
- Cubao Elementary School
- Araneta City
  - Gateway Mall
- Araneta Center–Cubao LRT station
- World Citi Colleges
- Diocesan Shrine of St. Joseph
- Anonas station
- Anonas City LRT center
- National College of Business and Arts
- Katipunan station
