= The Philippine Star =

Daily newspaper in the Philippines

- Truth Shall Prevail

- Front page from March 19, 2018
- Type: Daily newspaper
- Format: Broadsheet and news website
- Owner(s): PhilStar Daily, Inc. MediaQuest Holdings (51%); Belmonte family (21%); Private stock (28%)
- Founder(s): Betty Go-Belmonte; Maximo V. Soliven; Art Borjal
- Publisher: Pilipino Star Printing Co., Inc.
- President: Miguel G. Belmonte
- Editor-in-chief: Ana Marie Pamintuan
- Associate editor: Millet M. Mananquil; Doreen G. Yu; Marichu A. Villanueva
- Managing editor: Romel A. Lara
- Founded: July 28, 1986; 40 years ago (14,644 issues)
- Political alignment: Centre-left
- Language: English
- Headquarters: The Philippine STAR Building, Amvel Business Park, Dr. A Santos Avenue, Sucat, Parañaque City
- City: Manila
- Country: Philippines
- Circulation: Mon–Sat: 262,285 (2012); Sunday: 286,408 (2012)
- Sister newspapers: BusinessWorld; Pilipino Star Ngayon; Pang-Masa; The Freeman; Banat
- OCLC number: 854909029
- Website: philstar.com

The Philippine Star (self-styled The Philippine STAR) is an English-language newspaper in the Philippines and the flagship brand of the Philstar Media Group. First published on July 28, 1986, by veteran journalists Betty Go-Belmonte, Max Soliven and Art Borjal, it is one of several Philippine newspapers founded after the 1986 People Power Revolution.

Its sister publications include business newspaper BusinessWorld; Cebu-based, English-language broadsheet The Freeman; Filipino-language tabloids Pilipino Star Ngayon and Pang-Masa; Cebuano-language tabloid Banat, online news portals Philstar.com, PhilstarLife.com, Interaksyon (formerly with News5), Latest Chika, Wheels.PH, PropertyReport.PH, Multiverse.PH and TV/digital production unit Philstar TV. In 2025, The Philippine Star also launched the Pinoy pop online platform JuanCast.

In March 2014, the newspaper was acquired by MediaQuest Holdings, Inc., a media conglomerate subsidized by the PLDT Beneficial Trust Fund, after the company purchased a majority stake in Philstar Daily, Inc.

== History ==
The first issue of The Philippine Star on July 28, 1986.

=== Founding ===
The Philippine Star was first published seven months after the 1986 People Power Revolution that toppled strongman Ferdinand Marcos and propelled Corazon Aquino to the Philippine presidency. Before its establishment, founders Betty Go-Belmonte, Max Soliven and Art Borjal were veteran journalists involved in the "Mosquito Press", a collective name for the different newspapers critical of the Marcos administration that were published after the Martial Law era from 1972 to 1981. At that time, Belmonte was the publisher of a small, monthly magazine called The Star, a predecessor of The Philippine Star.

On December 9, 1985, a few months before the 1986 People Power Revolution, Belmonte, Soliven, and Borjal, together with Eugenia Apostol, Louie Beltran, and Florangel Rosario-Braid, founded the English-language newspaper Philippine Daily Inquirer, which soon became the Marcos administration's most vocal critic. However, after the revolution, questions about finances and a divergence of priorities caused a rift among the Inquirer's founders, which led to Belmonte, Soliven, and Borjal's founding of The Philippine Star. Belmonte served as the founding chairman of the Board of Directors, while Soliven acted as the founding publisher and chairman of the editorial board. Antonio Roces served as the first editor-in-chief until his resignation in 1989.

=== Early years ===
Philstar Media Group
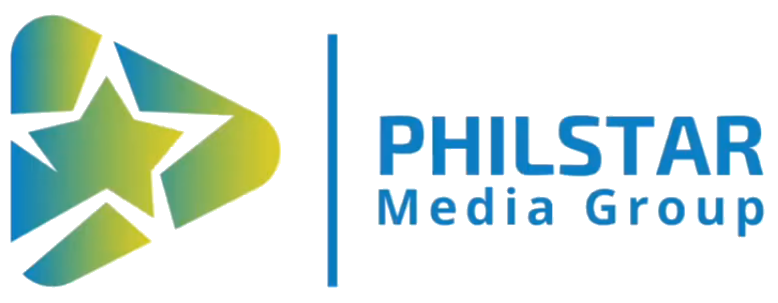
- Type: Subsidiary
- Industry: Mass media
- Founded: 1986
- Founder: Betty Go Belmonte
- Headquarters: The Philippine STAR Building, Amvel Business Park, Dr. A. Santos Avenue, Sucat, 1700 Parañaque City
- Key people: Victorico P. Vargas (Chairman); Miguel G. Belmonte (President and CEO); Carlos R. Dizon (CFO)
- Products: Print publishing, digital media, Out-of-home advertising, television production, event management
- Brands: BusinessWorld; The Freeman; Pilipino Star Ngayon; Pang-Masa; Banat News; Philstar.com; Interaksyon; PhilstarLife.com; Latest Chika; PropertyReport.ph; Wheels.ph; JuanCast
- Owner: PLDT Beneficial Trust Fund
- Parent: MediaQuest Holdings
- Subsidiaries: BusinessWorld Publishing Corporation (majority stake); Philstar Daily, Inc. Philstar Global Corporation; Pilipino Star Ngayon, Inc.

The first issue of the newspaper on July 28, 1986, had eight pages, no advertisements and carried the headline, "Wear yellow and die" that featured the death of 23-year-old Stephen Salcedo, a bystander killed by a mob of Marcos loyalists during a rally at Manila's Luneta Park. The masthead of the newspaper carried the motto, "Truth Shall Prevail", reflecting its editorial policy of presenting both sides of the story instead of the prevailing "scoop mentality" of that time. Aside from the main news section, the first issue also includes the World, Nation, Money, Life and Sports sections.

The first issue of The Philippine Star was printed at Philstar Daily, Inc.'s printing press in Port Area, Manila and made use of a blue and yellow color scheme, which eventually became its signature colors. For its initial price of ₱1.75, the newspaper had an initial print run of "a few thousand copies".

At first, the newspaper was only published from Mondays to Saturdays because Belmonte prohibited work on Sundays. To capitalize on Sunday readership, Philstar Daily, Inc. began publishing Starweek on February 15, 1987, which served as the Sunday magazine of The Philippine Star. Eventually, on February 14, 1988, the newspaper added a Sunday issue in response to the demand for news on that day, while continuing its publication of Starweek. Aside from The Philippine Star, Philstar Daily, Inc. also started publishing a Filipino-language tabloid Ang Pilipino Ngayon, which eventually became Pilipino Star Ngayon and its other sister papers Business Star and Evening Star.

=== Soliven era ===
With the sudden death of Belmonte due to cancer on January 28, 1994, Soliven assumed chairmanship of the Board of Directors while retaining his position as publisher. He appointed Belmonte's 30-year-old son, Miguel Belmonte, as executive vice president. In the same year, the newspaper made use of the slogan "The only paper you read from cover to cover", in keeping with the new editorial policy of improving every single section of the paper so each can stand on its own even without the main news section. On August 4, 1995, The Philippine Star became the first Philippine broadsheet newspaper to publish a colored front page.

=== Miguel Belmonte era ===
In 1998, the Board of Directors unanimously appointed Miguel Belmonte as president and CEO, while Soliven remained as chairman of the board of directors and publisher. The following year, the newspaper introduced "Hotline 2000", which made use of SMS as a means for opinion polling, thus becoming a pioneer in televoting in the Philippine print media industry. It was the beginning of other digital endeavors that brought the newspaper to the Digital Age. In 2000, the newspaper debuted its website, philstar.com, thus becoming one of the first newspapers in the Philippines to have a presence in the Internet (the website itself would later launched its own editorial team and began publishing news articles independently since 2009). In the same year, the company began using computer-to-plate printing system. In that year too, Miguel's brother, Isaac Belmonte, was appointed editor-in-chief of the newspaper.

To further expand its readership, The Philippine Star entered into a partnership with fast food restaurant Jollibee in 2003 to become the first newspaper to be distributed free of charge in a fast food restaurant. A complimentary copy of the newspaper was given to Jollibee patrons nationwide for every purchase of a Jollibee breakfast meal.

On August 24, 2004, The Philippine Star acquired Cebu City-based English-language newspaper (which is also the longest running newspaper in the city) The Freeman and its sister publication, the Cebuano-language tabloid Banat as part of its strategy to strengthen its presence and influence in the Visayas-Mindanao region. The Freeman is the longest-running broadsheet newspaper in Cebu City, established on May 10, 1919, while Banat was first published on August 23, 1994. Both newspapers are owned by the influential Gullas political family.

The newspaper lost its founding publisher after Soliven died in Tokyo, Japan on November 24, 2006. Isaac Belmonte eventually replaced him as publisher and chairman of the editorial board in 2012. Former executive editor Ana Marie "Amy" Pamintuan serves as current editor-in-chief after replacing Isaac Belmonte in 2012.

Philstar.com began as an online repository of The Philippine Star. In addition to this, however, the website has begun producing its own content and has a separate editorial team. While Philstar Daily Inc. operates the newspaper and social media platforms as well as niche websites, the website is operated by Philstar Global Corp.

=== Acquisition by MediaQuest Holdings ===
As early as 2009, businessman and PLDT chairman Manuel V. Pangilinan had expressed his interest in acquiring a stake in The Philippine Star in a bid to dominate the multimedia industry. The following year, MediaQuest Holdings, Inc., the media conglomerate of the PLDT Beneficial Trust Fund, acquired a 20-percent stake in the newspaper, as well as an 18-percent stake in its rival Philippine Daily Inquirer. In 2014, MediaQuest finally took control of The Philippine Star after it acquired a majority stake of 51 percent The Belmonte family retained a 21-percent stake, as well as management and editorial control. Pangilinan who also serves as MediaQuest's chairman has since appointed lawyer Ray Espinosa as chairman of the newspaper's board of directors.

The Philippine Star acquired the 76.67% stake of Hastings Holdings, Inc. in its sister broadsheet BusinessWorld in 2015. The transaction was done to enhance to its market leadership and to strengthen BusinessWorld's position in the newspaper business.

== Notable columnists ==
=== Opinion ===
- Betty Go-Belmonte, journalist and founding chairman of The Philippine Star; wife of former House Speaker Feliciano Belmonte, Jr.
- Louie Beltran, journalist and former editor-in-chief of the Philippine Daily Inquirer
- Max Soliven, journalist, founding publisher and former chairman of the Editorial Board of The Philippine Star
- Art Borjal, journalist, legislator, and president of The Philippine Star (1988 to 1990)
- Teddy Benigno, journalist, talk show host and former Press Secretary during the Corazon Aquino administration.
- Ricky Lo, Former entertainment writer, showbiz commentator, and TV host.
- Ernesto Maceda, lawyer, former Philippine ambassador to the US and former Senate President.
- F. Sionil José, writer, novelist and National Artist of the Philippines for Literature.
- Alex Magno, political scientist and academician from the University of the Philippines. He was a former director of the Development Bank of the Philippines.
- Satur Ocampo, activist, journalist, writer and former congressional representative for Bayan Muna party-list group.
- Ronald Llamas, former Presidential Adviser on Political Affairs to Benigno Aquino III and former president of Akbayan
- James Michael Lafferty, prominent CEO and Olympic Athletics Coach.

=== Entertainment ===
- Boy Abunda, television host, publicist, talent manager and celebrity endorser.
- Joey de Leon, comedian, actor, recording artist and TV presenter. He hosts the noontime variety show Eat Bulaga! (formerly E.A.T.)
- Pepe Diokno, motion picture director, producer and screenwriter.

=== Lifestyle ===
- Tim Yap, TV and radio host, newspaper editor, creative director, columnist, club owner and eventologist.
- Cheryl Tiu, lifestyle columnist and editor-at-large of Lifestyle Asia magazine.
- Lucy Torres, actress, model, television host and mayor of Ormoc.
- Bianca Gonzalez, lifestyle columnist, TV host and model.

=== Sports ===
- Quinito Henson, sports analyst and TV sports commentator.

=== Others ===
- Jarius Bondoc
- Rene Alviar
- Jing Castañeda
- Ana Marie Pamintuan

== See also ==
- Manila Bulletin
- Philippine Daily Inquirer
- The Manila Times
