= New Zealand Dairy Board =

New Zealand organization that controlled dairy exports from 1923–2001

The New Zealand Dairy Board (NZDB) was a statutory board in control of the export of all New Zealand dairy products from its formation in 1923 until 2001. It operated through a global network of marketing subsidiaries.

In 2001, the Dairy Board was merged with the two largest New Zealand dairy cooperatives (which represented 96% of the industry) to a company initially called GlobalCo, but shortly afterwards renamed Fonterra.

The merger required approval from the Commerce Commission, which it declined, so a special Act of Parliament, the Dairy Industry Restructuring Act 2001 was passed allowing the merger to occur.

== See also ==
- Fonterra
- New Zealand Meat Producers Board 1922
- New Zealand Wool Board 1944
- Dairy farming in New Zealand
- Agriculture in New Zealand
