= Lady in Red (ghost) =

Type of female ghost

A Lady in Red or Red Lady is a type of female ghost, similar to the White Lady, but according to legend is more specifically attributed to a jilted lover, killed in a fit of passion, or a woman of vanity. In all cases, the Lady in Red is wearing a scarlet or blood red dress. She is said to typically be friendly in disposition, with a story attached to historic hotels, theatres or other public places, with a higher frequency of reports.

== United States ==
=== Northeast ===
Accounts of a Lady in Red have been told by actors and guests at the Ghostlight Theatre in Amherst, New York.

At Wilkes University in Wilkes-Barre, Pennsylvania, the Weckesser building is reportedly haunted by a Lady in Red that according to one witness appears real until vanishing.

=== South ===
A Lady in Red has been reported haunting Wrexham Hall in Chesterfield, Virginia where it is believed Susannah Walthall, daughter of the original proprietor, died. The book Chesterfield County Chronicles relates that the woman is seen sitting on the porch and that her footsteps can be heard. Rocking chairs move on their own and doors open and close.

The Red Lady of Huntingdon College in Montgomery, Alabama was a former student that mainly wore red. Her ghost is said to linger in the corridors and further inspired an annual run by students called The Red Lady Run.

A Lady in Red at the Gladstone Inn has been the subject of multiple reports and oral histories in Black Mountain, North Carolina and whose story is included on their local walking tour.

In Charleston, South Carolina, near Dock Street Theatre, a Lady in Red is said to be the ghost of Nettie Dickerson, a prostitute who frequented the Planter's Hotel (now the historic French Quarter building). According to legend, she worked as a clerk in the nearby St. Philip's Episcopal Church, while visiting the hotel at night. At the age of 25 she was standing in her red dress on the balcony of the hotel during a storm when she was struck by lightning and killed.

The Rawls Hotel in Enterprise, Alabama is purportedly haunted by a Lady in Red that was shoved from the balcony to her death.

=== Midwest ===
Visitors of the National House Inn bed and breakfast in Marshall, Michigan have reported seeing a Lady in Red on the front staircase.

In Chicago's Drake Hotel, a jealous woman wearing a blood-red dress took her life after jumping from the 10th floor (or the roof, as accounts vary). Guests claim to see her in her last steps from the Gold Coast Room, the Palm Court, and on the 10th floor.

A Lady in Red is said to haunt Illinois Wesleyan University's Kemp Hall. The mansion was once owned by the prosperous DeMange family, whose matriarch died only after a year in the house. Her reflection is reportedly seen on certain evenings in a full-length mirror off the top steps of the second floor where she is preparing herself for a grand ball. Reportedly she is also said to sometimes interrupt the broadcast of the student radio station, WESN 88.1 FM, which is located in the basement of Kemp Hall. Urban legend states that there was at one time a procedural sheet for students, listing what to do to appease her, as she occasionally interferes with a wall of static.

In Madison, Indiana, the Civil War era Lanier Mansion references on their walking tour a Lady in Red disturbing the grounds.

=== West ===
The fifth floor of the Mizpah Hotel in Nevada is known for a Lady in Red known as "Rose" (her prostitute name) who died at the hands of a jealous lover. According to one source, Rose's real name, was Evelyn May Johnston, though there are no records to confirm that a woman by this name existed at that time, nor that a murder similar to the "Red Lady" crime ever took place in the hotel. Reportedly in the suite named for her, she is known to whisper in men's ears and leave pearls from her broken necklace on guest pillows.

Blake Street Vault in Denver is said to have a resident Lady in Red, referred to as Lydia, who was a saloon girl from the 1860s. She is allegedly seen in the shadows of its basement and the sound of her high heels walk across its floorboards. Lydia is said to have been murdered by an enraged male patron of the saloon while one story explains she was pushed by him down the staircase.

The Lady in Red is said to frequent the Spirit Room of the Connor Hotel in Jerome, Arizona.

In San Antonio, Texas at the St. Anthony Hotel, reports of a Lady in Red have held that she enters the women's restroom, clicks her heels against the marble, and sits in a stall before vanishing.

The Texas State Capitol in Austin has its own Lady in Red sighting and is rumored to be the ghost of a woman that was having an affair with a man that worked on the third floor.

=== California ===
Truckee, California features a Lady in Red on their ghost walk.

In Palm Springs, a Lady in Red is said to frequent the spot of her death outside of Korakia Pensione, a Moroccan styled Inn once known as Dar Marroc an exclusive stopover for the likes of Winston Churchill, Rudolph Valentino and Errol Flynn.

At the Mendocino Hotel, a Lady in Red is said to haunt the establishment having died in a car accident on her honeymoon.

The winding McEwan Road to Burlington Hotel in Port Costa lays claim to a Lady in Red that allegedly worked on the premises when it was a bordello in the 19th century.

=== Northwest ===
The Moran Mansion in Orcas Island, Washington is allegedly haunted by a Lady in Red who is believed to be the spirit of Alice Goodfellow Rheem, the eccentric wife of the mansion's second owner Donald Rheem.

== Canada ==
In Vancouver, there is said to be the spirit of a woman named Jennie Pearl Cox, a socialite who died in a car accident in 1944 by the doors of the Fairmont Hotel Vancouver.

The FirstOntario Concert Hall, informally known as Hamilton Place, in Hamilton, Ontario is said to be haunted by a Lady in Red that also weeps red tears. She has been reported by both staff and theatre-goers.

Toronto's Lower Bay transit station has been closed since 1966 but has numerous reports of a Lady in Red. According to witnesses, the ghost appears distraught as it glides without feet or eyes. Furthermore, workers who claim to have seen her have refused to go back to work in the tunnel.

== United Kingdom and Ireland ==
A Red Lady is said to walk around the Church of St Nicholas in Pluckley, England since the 12th century.

Leap Castle is claimed to be haunted by a Red Lady who is holding a dagger. It is reported she committed suicide after being captured and raped.

On the historic site of Greenbank House in Glasgow, Scotland, a Lady in Red is said to haunt the garden with the phantom of a large dog.

== Asia ==
In Malacca, a Lady in Red has been reported on the ninth floor of the nine-storey apartments in Little India, Malacca. The area is known for jumpers.

In Kengtung, Myanmar, the New Kengtung Hotel (now known as the Amazing Kengtung Resort) is a historic hotel built on the site of the former royal palace of a Shan sawbwa. Guests staying there have reportedly experienced paranormal encounters, including the sound of ancient music and apparitions of women dressed in traditional red clothing with red-painted fingernails.

In Thailand, there is a story of a Lady in Red, believed to be the spirit of a woman who drowned in the Bang Pakong River. Witnesses have reported seeing her while driving across the Bang Pakong River Bridge at night.

== In popular culture ==
Korean drama series The Ghost Detective is named for a Lady in Red that accompanies the main character in solving crimes.

In Kat Shepherd's children's book, a Lady in Red haunts a theater in The Twilight Curse.

In the film Crimson Peak, Allerdale Hall is haunted by Red Lady ghosts whose red color comes from being buried in red clay vats. They are all explained as having been married by its owner Thomas Sharpe, brought to the manor, and murdered by Thomas's elder incestuous sister Lucille. They exist to warn Thomas's fourth wife Edith of her eventual fate.

== See also ==
- Apparitional experience
- Baobhan sith
- Bloody Mary (folklore)
- Clíodhna
- Hulder
- Kuldevta
- La Llorona
- Leanan sídhe
- List of ghosts
- Madam Koi Koi
- Moura Encantada
- Onryō
- Pontianak (folklore)
- Resurrection Mary
- Samodiva
- Niles Canyon ghost
- Sayona
- Shadow people
- Weiße Frauen
- Witte Wieven
- Xana
- Yūrei
