= Hulder =

Seductive forest creature found in Scandinavian folklore

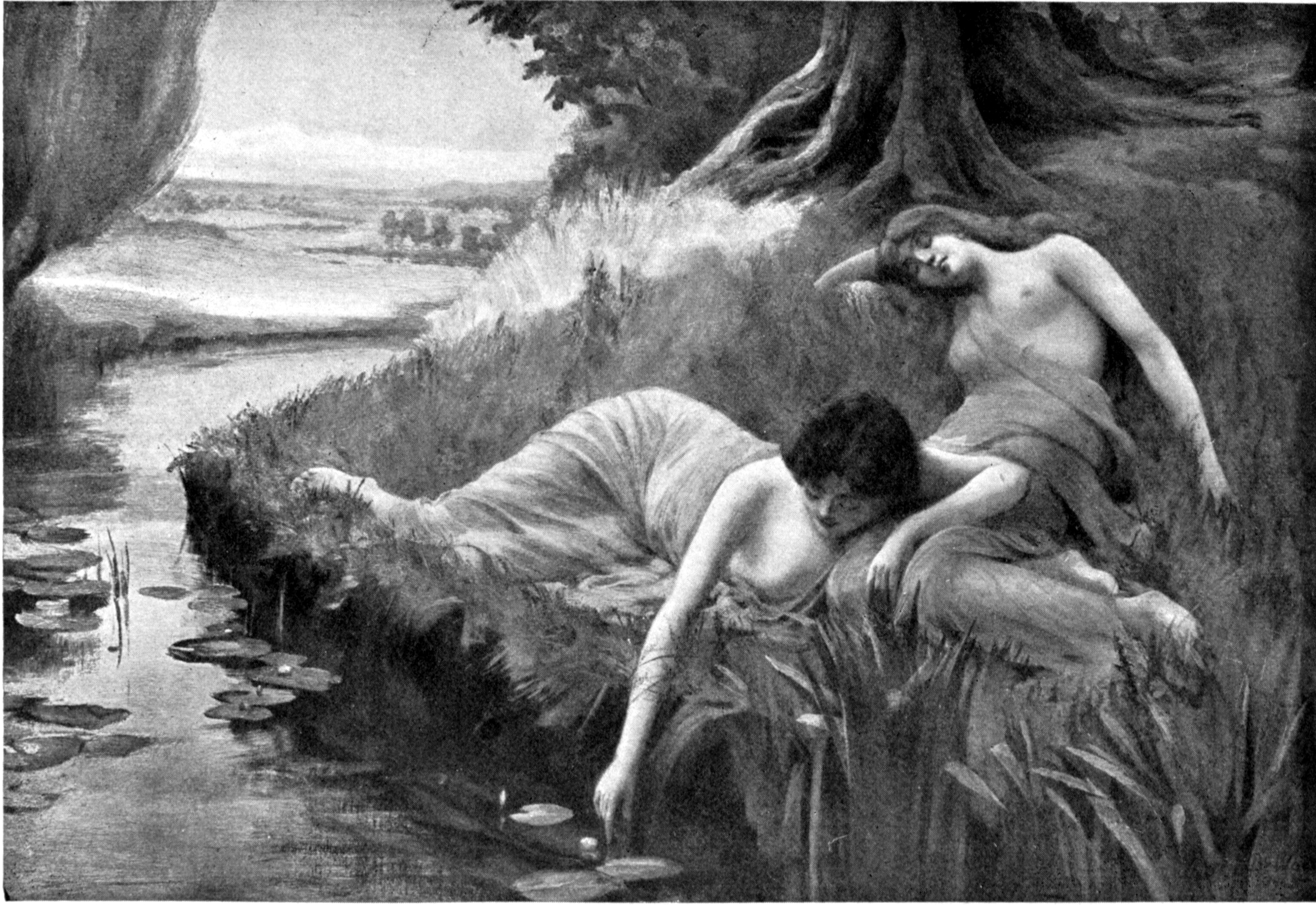
- Huldra's Nymphs (1909) by Bernard Evans Ward

Creature information
- Grouping: Legendary creature
- Sub grouping: Humanoid
- Similar entities: Huldufólk "hidden folk", skogsrå baobhan sith, glaistig siren, succubus

Origin
- Country: Norway
- Region: Scandinavia
- Habitat: Forests

A hulder (or huldra) is a seductive forest creature found in Scandinavian folklore. Her name derives from a root meaning "covered" or "secret". In Norwegian folklore, she is known as huldra ("the [archetypal] hulder", though folklore presupposes that there is an entire Hulder race and not just a single individual). She is known as the skogsrå "forest spirit" or Tallemaja "pine tree Mary" in Swedish folklore, and ulda in Sámi folklore. Her name suggests that she is originally the same being as the völva divine figure Huld and the German Holda.

The word hulder is only used of a female; a "male hulder" is called a huldrekall and also appears in Norwegian folklore. This being is closely related to other underground dwellers, usually called tusser (sg., tusse).

Though described as beautiful, the huldra is noted for having a distinctive inhuman feature—an animal's hairy legs and tail, (usually a cow's or a fox's), and/or a back resembling a hollowed-out tree—carefully disguised under long clothing.

== Folklore ==
The hulder is one of several rå (keeper, warden), including the aquatic sjörå or havsfru, later identified with a mermaid, and the bergsrå in caves and mines who made life tough for the poor miners.

Further information can be found in the collected Norwegian folktales of Peter Christen Asbjørnsen and Jørgen Moe.

=== Relations with humans ===
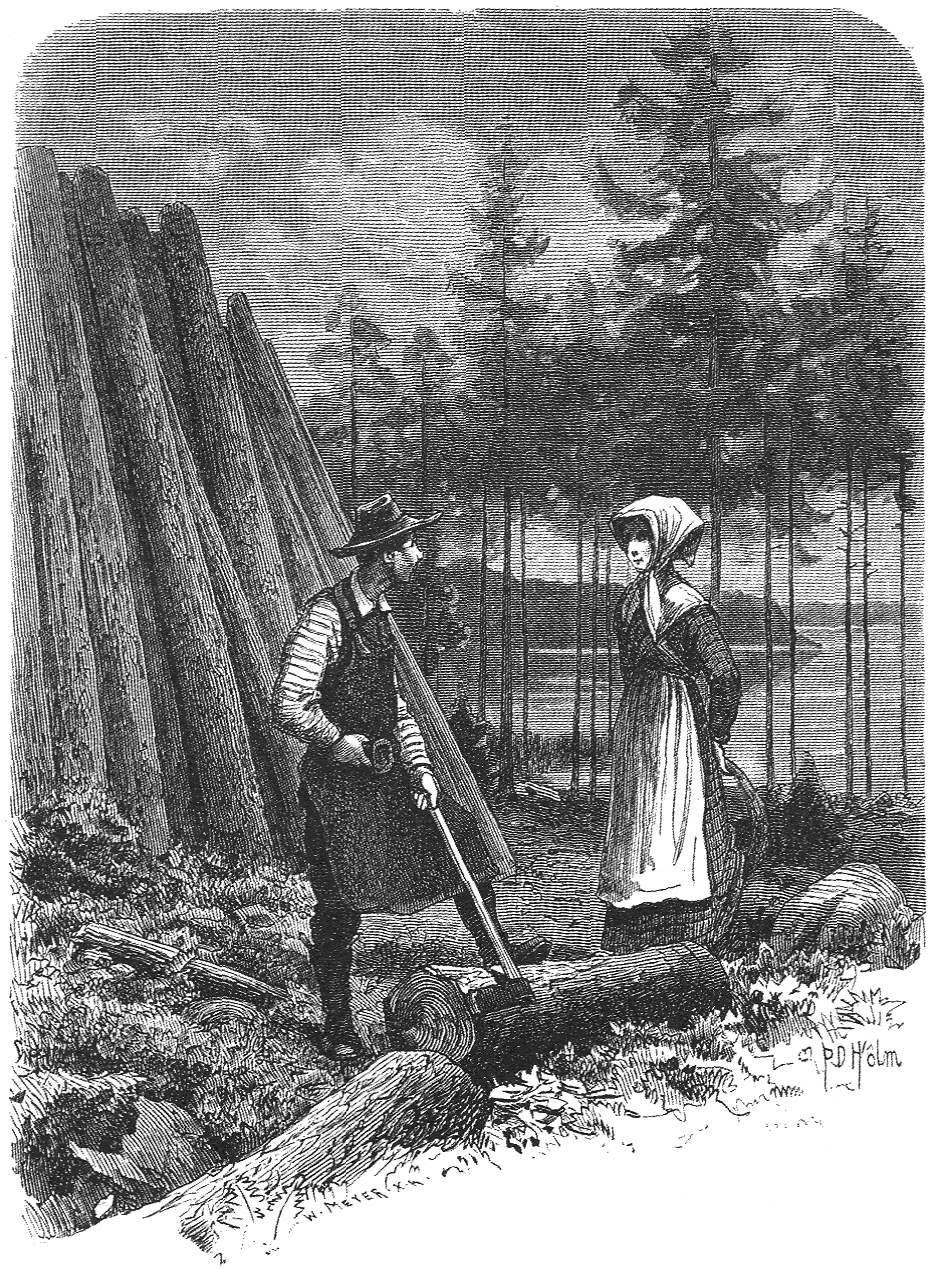
A hulder is talking with a charcoal burner. She looks like a young farmer woman, but her tail is peeking out under her skirt. From Svenska folksägner (1882).

The hulders were held to be kind to charcoal burners, watching their charcoal kilns while they rested. Knowing that she would wake them if there were any problems, they were able to sleep, and in exchange they left provisions for her in a special place. A tale from Närke illustrates further how kind a hulder could be, especially if treated with respect (Hellström 1985:15).

== Toponyms ==
A multitude of places in Scandinavia are named after the Hulders, often places by legend associated with the presence of the "hidden folk". Here are some examples showing the wide distribution of Hulder-related toponyms between the northern and southern reaches of Scandinavia, and the terms usage in different language groups' toponyms.

=== Danish ===
- Huldremose (Hulder Bog) is a bog on Djursland, Denmark famous for the discovery of the Huldremose Woman, a bog body from 55 BC.

=== Norwegian ===
- Hulderheim is southeast on the island of Karlsøya in Troms county, Norway. The name means "Home of the Hulder".
- Hulderhusan is an area on the southwest part of Norway's largest island, Hinnøya, whose name means "Houses of the Hulders".

=== Sámi ===
- Ulddaidvárri is a place in Kvænangen Municipality in Troms county (Norway). The name means "Mountain of the Hulders" in North Sámi.
- Ulddašvággi is a valley southwest of Alta in Finnmark county (Norway). The name means "Hulder Valley" in North Sámi. The peak guarding the pass over from the valley to the mountains above has a similar name, Ruollačohkka, meaning "Troll Mountain"—and the large mountain presiding over the valley on its northern side is called Háldi, which is a term similar to the above-mentioned Norwegian rå, that is a spirit or local deity which rules a specific area.

== In popular culture ==
- In the mobile game Year Walk, one of the Watchers is a Huldra.
- Neil Gaiman's novella The Monarch of the Glen, published in the collection Fragile Things, includes references to Hulder legends.
- In the subsequent Year Walk: Bedtime Stories for Awful Children, the first chapter is devoted to the Huldra.
- Huldror play a key role in Arlo Z. Grave's dieselpunk fantasy series The Duskingr Saga. The cultural rift between the huldror and selkie is a central issue in the series. In book 1, The Ice Moves for No One, the huldra woman Vespald plays a major role and will be a primary character in the series moving forward. She is also portrayed as autistic and speaks partially in a signed language. There are several other named huldror characters including a priest named Lylok.
- The titular character (portrayed by Silje Reinåmo) from the 2012 Norwegian film Thale is a huldra.
- There's a Belgian/American Black Metal band named Hulder based in Washington.
- A horror film festival called Huldra has been taking place since 2020 in Nottinghamshire, UK.

== See also ==
- Banshee
- Baobhan sith
- Bloody Mary (folklore)
- Clíodhna
- Dames blanches
- Enchanted Moura
- Glaistig
- Glashtyn
- Huldufólk
- Leanan sídhe
- Mami Wata
- Mavka
- Miss Koi Koi
- Neck (water spirit)
- Nymph
- Patasola
- Pontianak (folklore)
- Rusalka
- Samodiva (mythology)
- Sihuanaba
- Siren (mythology)
- Skogsrå
- Succubus
- Thale (film)
- Weiße Frauen
- White Lady (ghost)
- Wight
- Witte Wieven
