= Leanan sídhe =

Spirit figure in Irish folklore

The leannán sídhe (Irish: [ˈl̠ʲan̪ˠaːnˠ ˈʃiː]; lit. 'fairy lover'; Scottish Gaelic: leannan sìth, Manx: lhiannan shee) is a figure from Celtic mythology. She is depicted as a beautiful woman of the Aos Sí ("people of the fairy mounds") who takes a human lover. Lovers of the leannán sídhe are said to live brief, though highly inspired, lives. The name comes from the Gaelic words for a sweetheart or lover and the term for inhabitants of fairy mounds (fairy). While the leannán sídhe is most often depicted as a female fairy, there is at least one reference to a male leannán sídhe troubling a mortal woman.

A version of the myth was popularized during the Celtic Revival in the late 19th-century. The leannán sídhe is mentioned by Jane Wilde, writing as "Speranza", in her 1887 Ancient Legends, Mystic Charms and Superstitions of Ireland. W. B. Yeats popularized his own 'newly-ancient' version of the leannán sídhe, emphasizing the spirit's almost vampiric tendencies. As he imagined it, the leannán sídhe is depicted as a beautiful muse who offers inspiration to an artist in exchange for their love and devotion; although the supernatural affair leads to madness and eventual death for the artist:

The Leanhaun Shee (fairy mistress) seeks the love of mortals. If they refuse, she must be their slave; if they consent, they are hers, and can only escape by finding another to take their place. The fairy lives on their life, and they waste away. Death is no escape from her. She is the Gaelic muse, for she gives inspiration to those she persecutes. The Gaelic poets die young, for she is restless, and will not let them remain long on earth—this malignant phantom.

== In literature and pop culture ==
The 2017 horror movie MUSE, written and directed by John Burr, features her as the mythical and deadly spirit who becomes the muse and lover of a painter.

== See also ==
- Irish mythology in popular culture
- Banshee
- Baobhan sith
- Cliodhna
- Dames Blanches
- Ganchanagh
- Hulder
- Pontianak
- Rusalka
- Samodiva
- Sayona
- Soucouyant
- Succubus
- Weiße Frauen
- Witte Wieven
