= White Lady =

Type of female ghost in folklore

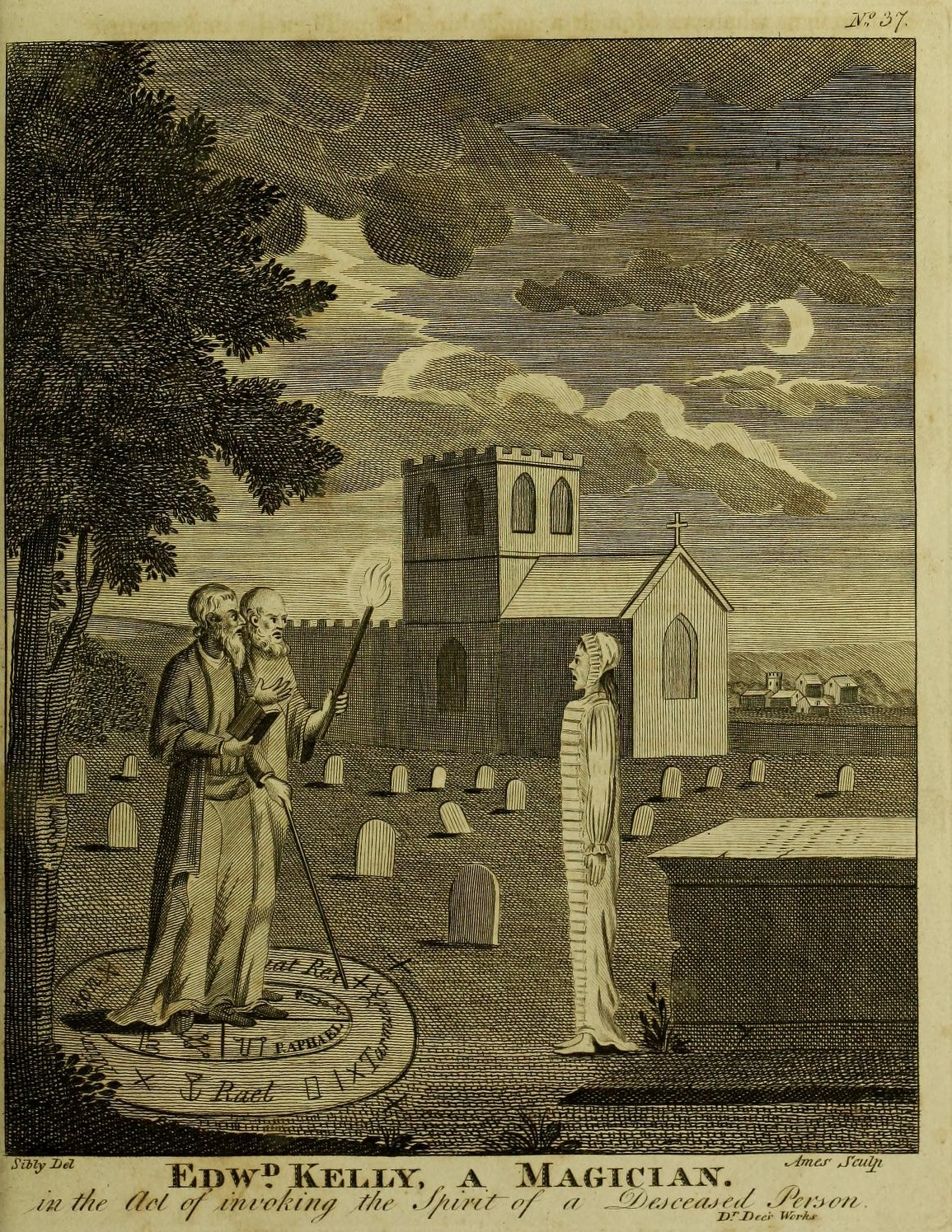
A depiction of John Dee (1527–1608) and Edward Kelley invoking a spirit.

A White Lady (or woman in white) is a type of female ghost, typically dressed in a white dress or similar garment, reportedly seen in rural areas and associated with local legends of tragedy. White Lady legends are found in many countries around the world. Common to many of these legends is an accidental or impending death, murder, or suicide and the theme of loss, betrayed by a husband or fiancé, and unrequited love.

Although the details differ, many White Lady traditions share recurring themes of untimely death, grief, betrayal, or unfulfilled love. In numerous accounts, the White Lady is believed to be the spirit of a woman who died through murder, suicide, accident, or abandonment. Some legends portray her as a silent apparition or an omen of misfortune, while others describe encounters in which she asks travelers for assistance before mysteriously disappearing.

== Global versions ==
In popular medieval legend, a White Lady is fabled to appear by day as well as by night in a house in which a family member is soon to die. They also appear within photos just before or after death. According to The Nuttall Encyclopædia, these spirits were regarded as the ghosts of deceased ancestors.

=== Brazil ===
Called Dama Branca or Mulher de Branco in Portuguese, the Brazilian Lady in White is said to be the ghost of a young woman who died of childbirth or violent causes. According to legend, she appears as a pale woman in a long white dress or a sleeping gown. Although usually speechless, she will occasionally recount her misfortunes. The origins of the myth are not clear. Luís da Câmara Cascudo's Dicionário do Folclore Brasileiro (Brazilian Folklore Dictionary) proposes that the ghost is related to the violent deaths of young white women who were murdered by their fathers or husbands in an "honor" killing. The most frequent reasons for these honor killings were adultery (actual or suspected), denial of sex, or abuse. Monteiro Lobato, in his book Urupês describes a young woman starved to death by her husband because he suspected she was in love with a black slave and only gave her the stewed meat of his corpse for food.

=== Canada ===
White Ladies are called Dames blanches in French. One legend claims that the surroundings of Montmorency Falls near Quebec City are haunted by a white lady. It is said to be the spirit of a young French-Canadian woman whose fiancé was killed while fighting against the British in the Battle of Beauport. The young couple allegedly used to meet near the top of the falls. Accordingly, the grieving woman is said to have chosen the site to end her life by throwing herself in the raging waters while wearing the wedding dress that she had recently ordered to be made. A smaller waterfall in the vicinity now bears the name Chute de la Dame Blanche (White Lady Waterfall) in reference to this legend.

=== Czech Republic ===
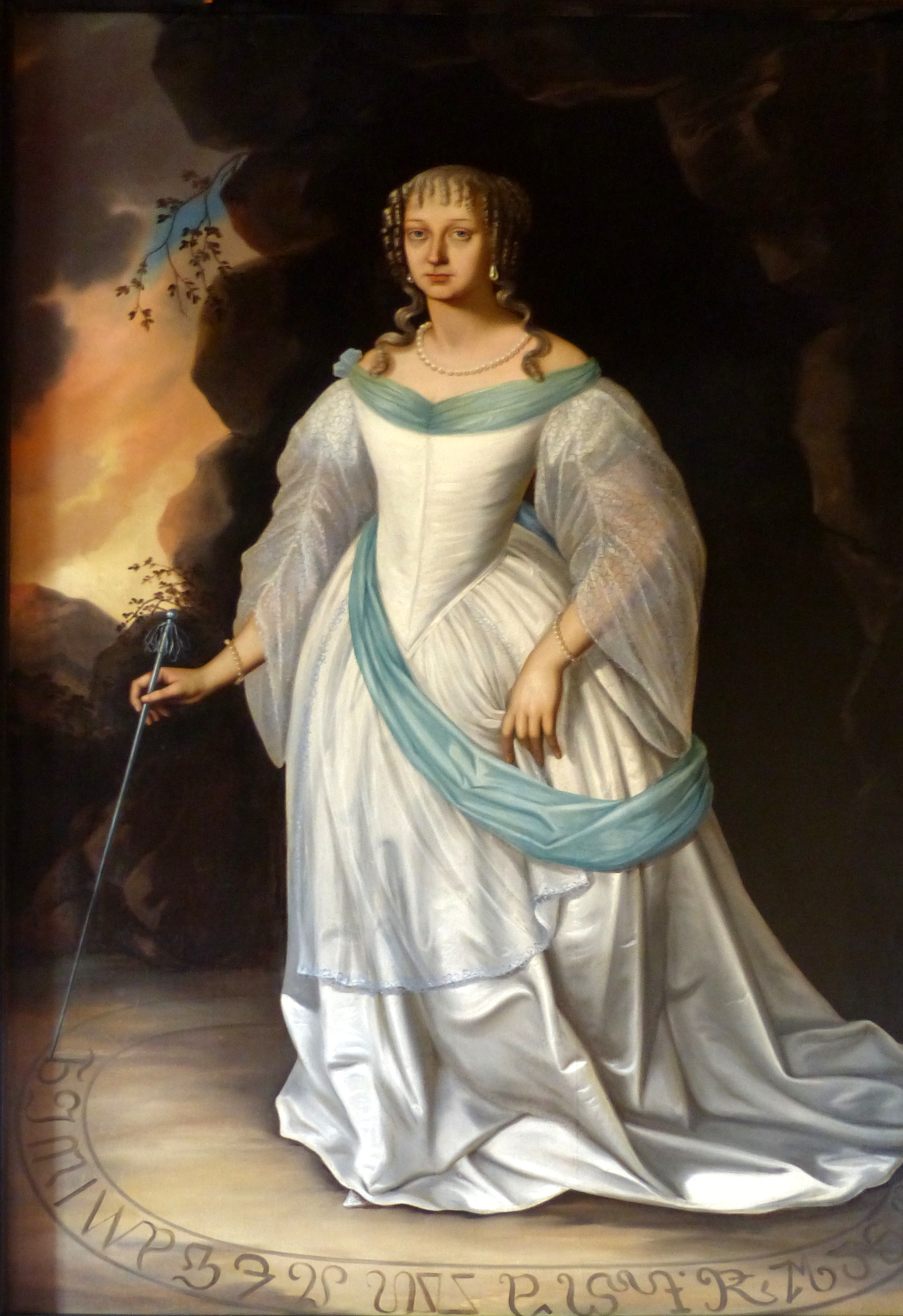
Perchta of Rožmberk

The best-known White Lady of the Czech Republic is the ghost of Perchta of Rožmberk at Rožmberk Castle. Perchta of Rožmberk (c. 1429–1476) was a daughter of an important Bohemian nobleman, Oldřich II of Rožmberk. She married another nobleman, Jan of Lichtenštejn (John of Liechtenstein) in 1449. The marriage was quite unhappy. One reason may have been that Perchta's father was reluctant to pay the agreed dowry. During her married life, Perchta wrote many letters to her father and brothers with colourful descriptions of her unhappy family life and the bad treatment by Jan of Lichtenštejn, including financial abuse and neglect. Some 32 of these letters had been handed down. Legend has it that as her husband was dying, he asked for her forgiveness for his treatment of her. Perchta refused, and her husband cursed her. After her death, she returned as a ghost to her family holdings. According to legends, the ghost was most apparent in the settlements of Rožmberk, Český Krumlov, Jindřichův Hradec, Třeboň and Telč. The story of White Lady is also included in the Ancient Bohemian Legends.

=== Estonia ===
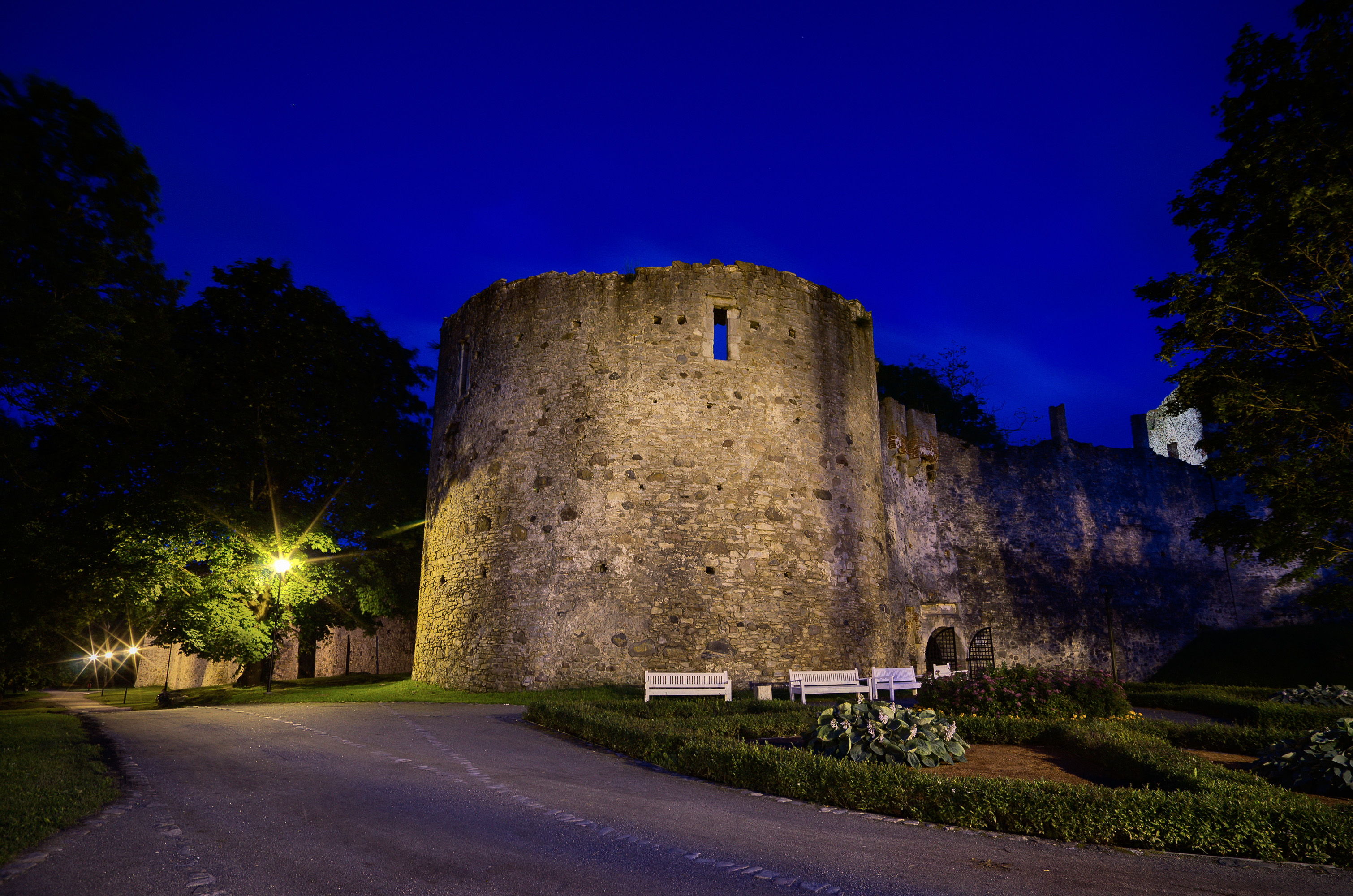
Haapsalu Castle

The most famous white lady of Estonia is said to reside in Haapsalu Castle. According to the legend, a canon fell in love with her, so she hid in the castle disguised as a choir boy, but she was discovered when the Bishop of Ösel-Wiek visited Haapsalu and subsequently immured in the wall of the chapel for her crime. To this day, she is said to look out of the Baptistery's window and grieve for her beloved man. According to legend, she can be seen on clear August full-moon nights.

=== Germany ===
White Ladies are called Witte Wiwer in northern Germany and Weiße Frauen in Standard German. Stories of white lady ghosts are associated with residential castles of the Hohenzollern family. Two women are supposed to be the historical basis of a ghost haunting the Plassenburg. According to legend, the countess Kunigunda of Orlamünde murdered her two children because she believed this could enable her to marry Albert of Nuremberg, who married Sophie von Henneberg († 1372) instead of her. She became a nun and died as an abbess of the monastery Himmelskron. A white lady ghost reportedly appeared in 1486, 1540, 1554 and 1677 as a harbinger of misfortune. A variation of the tale holds that the white lady of the Plassenburg is the unfortunate widow Bertha of Rosenberg from Bohemia, overthrown by the heathen Perchta.

A white lady ghost, said to be a harbinger of death and misfortune, was claimed to be seen in the Berliner Schloss in 1598 shortly before the death of John George of Brandenburg, and again in 1618, 1625, up until 1940. The castle is the residence of the kings of Prussia, and the stories associate the lady with several historical figures, most notably Anna Sydow, the paramour of Joachim II of Brandenburg (father of John George), who bore him two extramarital children. Sydow was imprisoned in the Spandau Citadel after Joachim's death by John George, despite his promise to care for her. She died in 1575 without regaining her freedom.

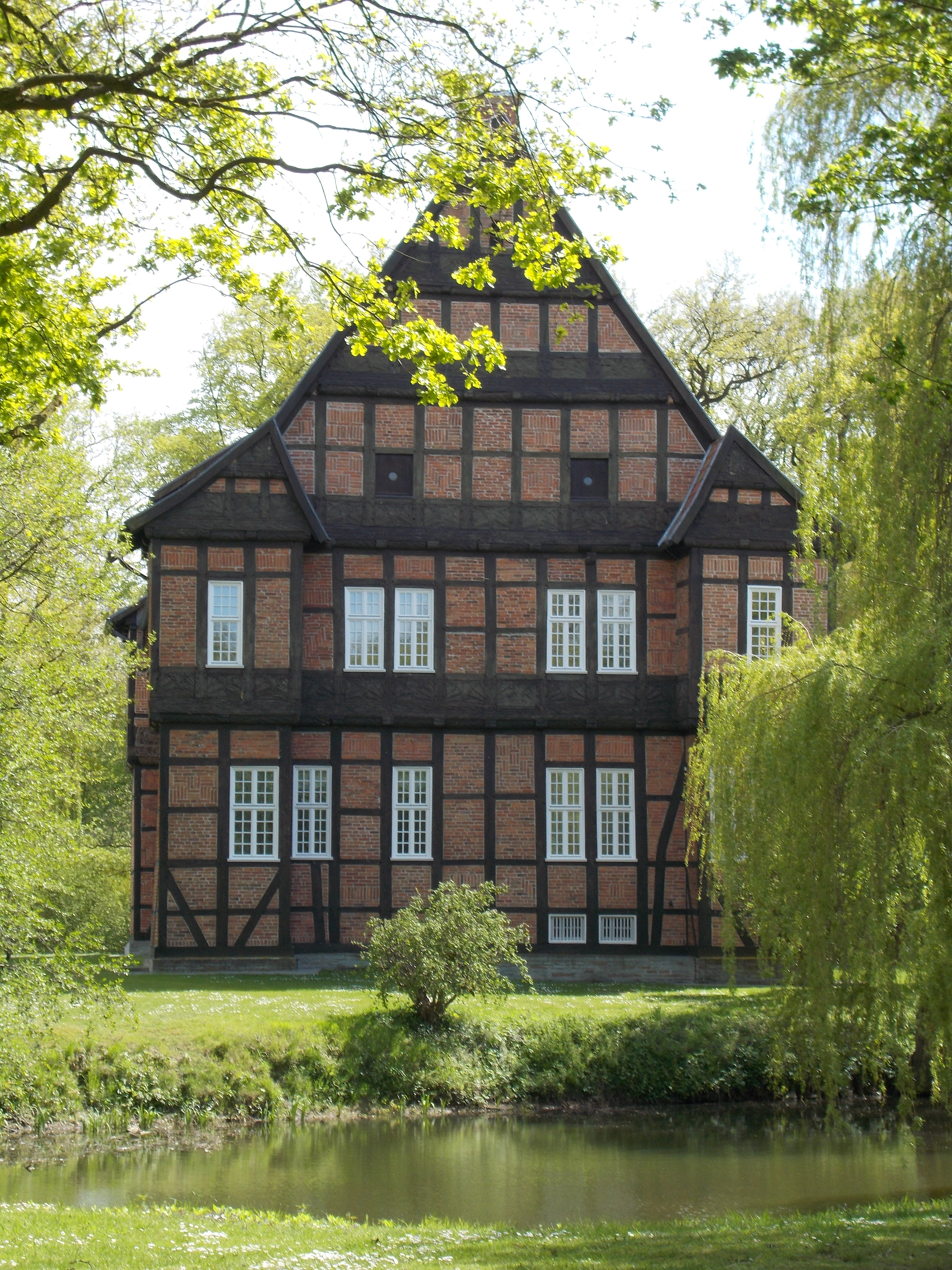
Haus Aussel, Civil Parish of Batenhorst, Germany

The castle of Düsseldorf is claimed to be haunted by a white lady. The castle was built in 1260 and demolished in 1896 with only an old tower remaining. According to legend, a duchess named Jakobine and her lover were murdered by her jealous husband. Her ghost was said to be seen before each of a series of fires that plagued the castle.

Friedland in Brandenburg is claimed to be haunted by a white lady, supposedly the daughter of a baronet cursed by her father for not giving him an heir. According to the legend, her ghost haunts the castle and surrounding forests, strangling anyone who talks to her.

Lahneck Castle is the site of a legend of a white lady ghost claimed to be stalking the castle. It is said that the ghost is Idilia Dubb (the main character of a novel, The Diary of Miss Idilia).

There is a legend about an adulterous nobleman's wife in the civil parish of Batenhorst, Rheda-Wiedenbrück, Westphalia. The legend originates from the time of the Thirty Years' War. According to the story, the nobleman encased her in the cellar of his manor Haus Aussel to assure she could not betray him while he went away to war, but he never returned, and her spirit supposedly haunts the premises forever afterwards. During recent renovations to the manor, workers found no human remains that might give factual basis to the legend.

According to legend a white lady haunts the remains of a monastery in the forest of the Uhlberg near to the famous Altmühltal with its limestone-underground and many potholes.

=== Hungary ===
In Hungarian mythology, a white lady was the ghost of a girl or young woman that died violently; usually, young women who committed suicide, were murdered, or died while imprisoned. The ghost is usually bound to a specific location and is often identified as a specific person (e.g. Elizabeth Báthory).

=== Ireland ===
In Charles Fort (Ireland), there is the story of a white lady, the ghost of a young woman that died on her wedding night. Her death was a suicide which followed the death of her husband at the hand of her father. She came back as a ghost to search for her father, and now every year on her marriage night you can hear her scream.

=== Netherlands ===
Vrouwen in wit (plural of vrouw in wit), or "Witte Wieven" as these women are called in local dialects, are mythical creatures of Low Saxon origin and so most known in the eastern and northern parts of the Netherlands. Sometimes referred to as witte joffers ("white maidens"), they can have a benevolent and malevolent nature. Often related with witches and/or ghosts, they show many similarities with the banshee, the fairy, and the elf. Understood as malevolent beings, they abduct or switch newborns, abduct women, and punish people who have mistreated them. As benevolent beings, they may aid in childbirth or offer good advice. Indeed, though the adjective wit means "white", it may originally refer to the Germanic word wid, related to English "wit" and "wise", and so might be better understood as "wise women", as they are known in Germany, where they are connected to the Völva.

They are believed to dwell in tumuli, the Hunebedden and on the moors. Wisps of mist and fog banks are sometimes called witte wieven.

The Schinveldse Bossen forest is also home to another White Lady story. Archival evidence suggests that the forest was once home to a castle farm that was built in 1396. In the 17th century (estimated 1667), this site was burned down killing the daughter of Lord Lambert Reynart. This historical event has spawned a few variations on a White Lady ghost story based around the death of the woman who burned with the castle farm. The most common versions of the tale involve the woman having two fighting lovers or of the site being burned on her wedding day by a jealous nobleman. However, all versions claim that she now wanders the forest like a ghost in a long white dress, some saying she only appears at midnight, and others saying she only appears on nights of the full moon. The site of the former castle farm is referred to as Lammendam after the ghost who supposedly haunts the area. The term is a Dutch adaptation of the French "La Madame Blanche." It is now protected as a cultural-historical site.

=== Philippines ===
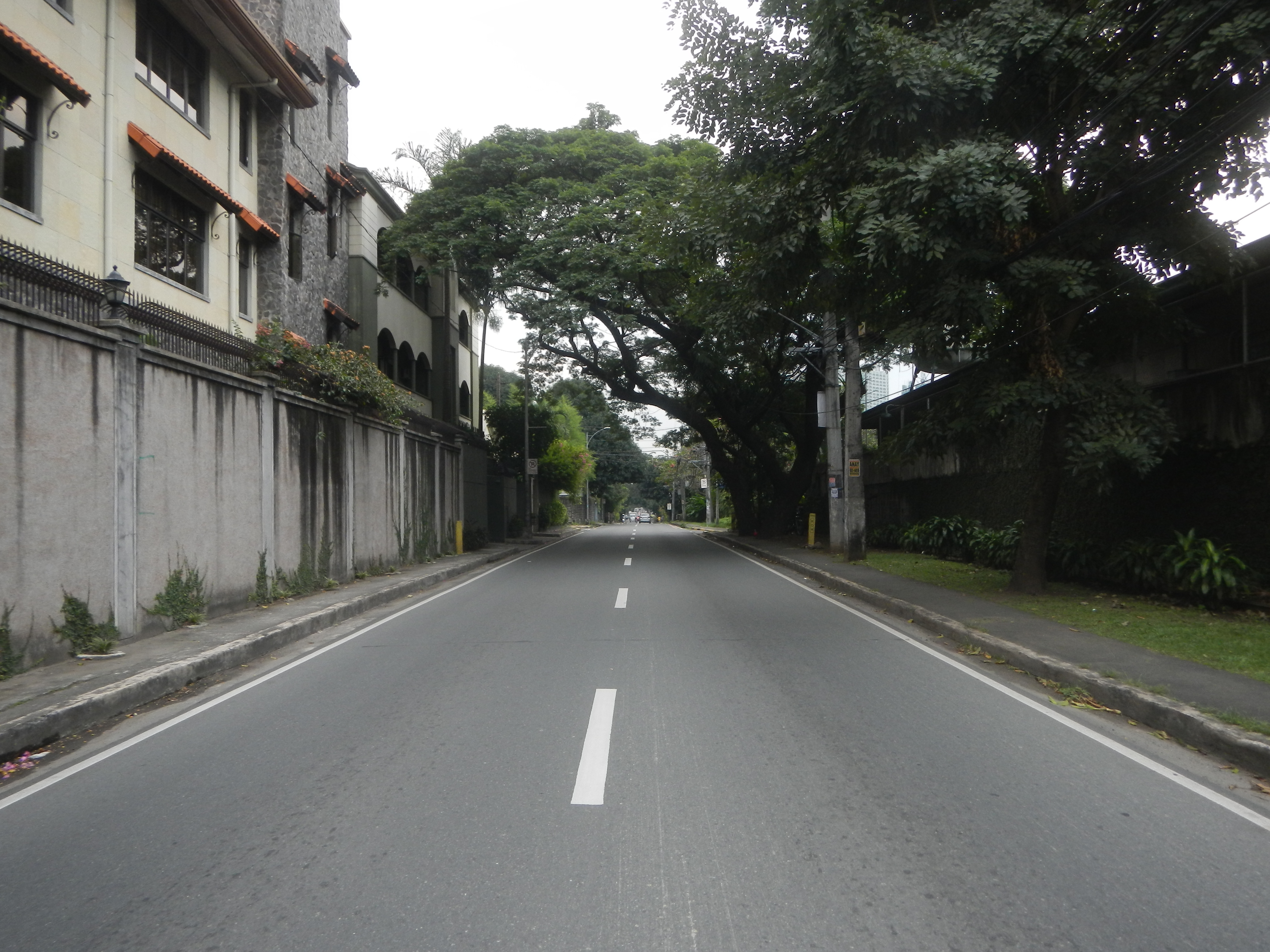
Balete Drive

White Ladies, indigenously known as kaperosa, are popular ghost story topics in the Philippines. White Ladies are often used to convey horror and mystery to young children for storytelling. Sightings of White Ladies are common around the country. The most prominent one is the White Lady of Balete Drive in Quezon City. It is said that it is the ghost of a long-haired woman in a white dress who, according to legend, died in a car accident while driving along Balete Drive. Most stories about her were told by taxi drivers doing the graveyard shift, such as when a taxi crosses Balete Drive, and a stunning woman is asking for a ride. The cabbie then looks behind and sees the woman's face was full of blood and bruises, causing him to abandon his taxi in terror.

In other instances, it is said that when solitary people drive on that street in the early morning, they briefly see the face of a white-clad woman in the rear-view mirror before she quickly disappears. Some accidents on this road are blamed on apparitions of the White Lady.

Many sources have said a reporter manufactured this legend in the 1950s as a combination of multiple stories from the area.

=== Russia ===
"The Maidens of Uley" is an East Siberian legend of the west Buryad people from the village of Ulei (or Ungin), Irkutsk Oblast, Russia. The legend tells about a young lady, Bulzhuuhai Duuhai, who did not want to marry. She kept running away from her husband, who treated her disrespectfully and locked her in a black yurt, instead of a traditional white one. Bulzhuuhai then hanged herself in a barn after singing and dancing at someone else's wedding for eight days and eight nights, feeling unwanted and unloved. After her death, she became a "zayan" (spirit). She joined other spirit maidens (some 350 of them), who haunt fiancés on their wedding day, bewitching them with their beauty and dragging them to the netherworld.

=== Serbia ===
In the village of Koprivica near Zaječar there is a legend about a ghost of a woman in a wedding dress that walks around at night scaring people. This ghost is most commonly referred to as the Dead Woman in White (Serbian cyrillic: Мртва Жена у Белом). There are two stories about the death of this woman: The first states that she died in the 70s in a car accident while going on her honeymoon while the second states that she hanged herself after her fiancé left her right before their wedding. She is apparently also seen stopping cars on the road between Bor and Zaječar. In August 2011, two brothers from Bor, inspired by the legend of the Woman in White, decided to prank drivers on the road towards Zaječar by having one of them put on a wedding dress and approach drivers while the other filmed it. The incident was reported to the police who managed to identify the brothers however they couldn't be charged with anything since they technically didn't break any laws.

=== Switzerland ===
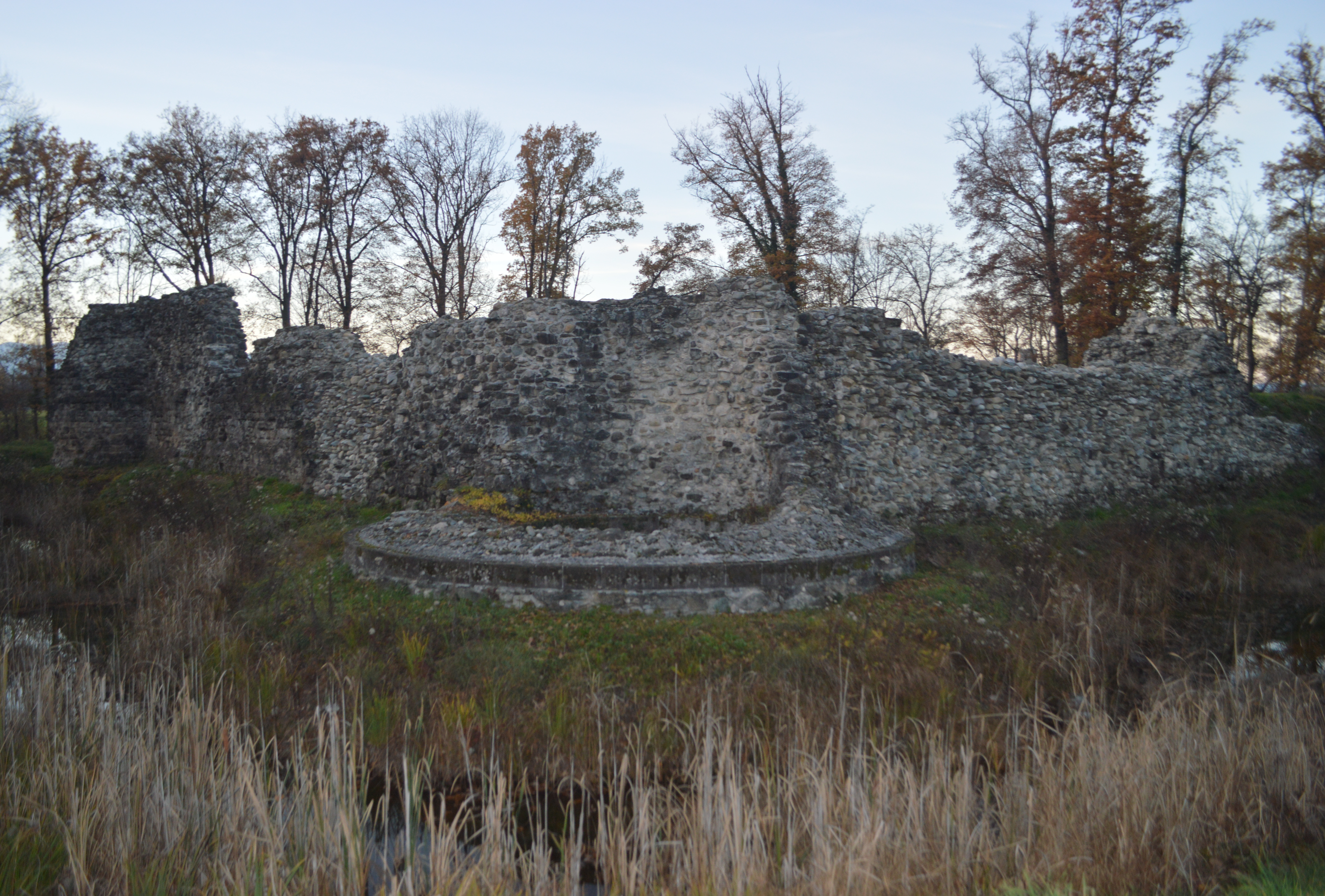
The ruins of Rouelbeau Castle, southeastern side

A popular legend has been associated for centuries with the ruins of Rouelbeau Castle in today's municipality of Meinier in the canton of Geneva. It centers around a woman without a name, supposedly the first wife of the knight Humbert de Choulex, under whose leadership the castle was constructed in a swampy area at the beginning of the 14th century. He reportedly repudiated her when she did not give birth to a son. The ghost has been linked to the disappearance of people and deaths from unexplained causes. It is unclear whether such supposed appearances occurred rather during moonless nights or full moon. However, it is undisputed that Christmas Eve is said to be her preferred timing. On some occasions, the whole castle and its former inhabitants were reportedly resurrected in its old glory for the night. La Dame Blanche herself is rumoured to be of striking beauty and wearing a diadem.

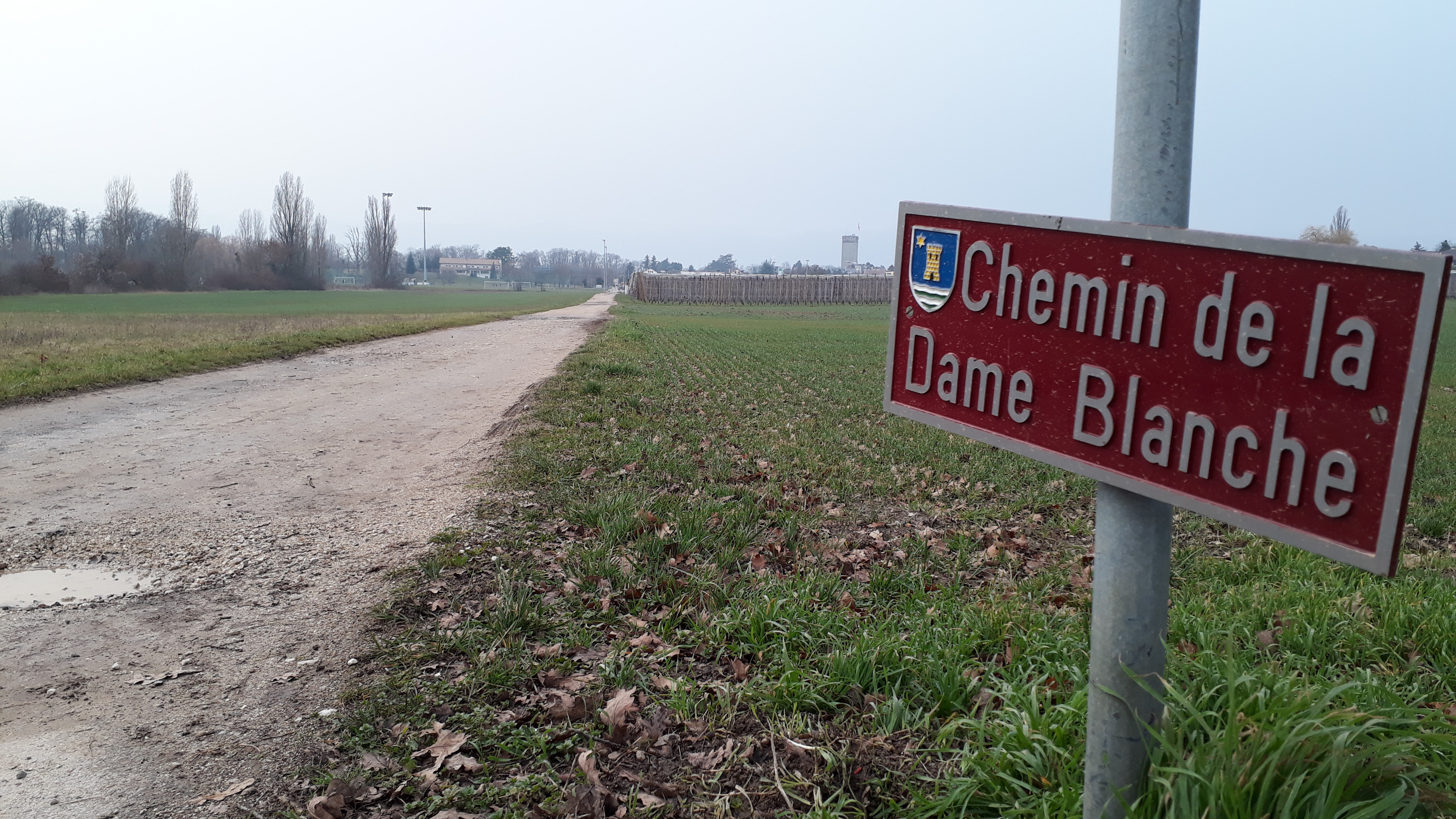
Chemin de la Dame Blanche with the ruins of the castle to the left behind the trees

In a version from 1870, which was published in 1902, a certain Jean Bahut told the story that he went out to the castle ruins on Christmas Eve as a sixteen-year-old during the French occupation of Geneva at the beginning of the 19th century to shoot some animals for dinner with his widowed and impoverished mother. He was hit by an ice-cold breath of air, which made him shudder, his blood clot and his hair stand on end. In the darkness, a white shadow came out of the tower uttering hollow groans. It touched him and disappeared. The young man tried to flee but could not lift his feet from the ground. While the White Lady rewarded his commitment to his mother with a treasure of gold and silver, she punished his wealthy and greedy relative one year later in a deadly way by tricking and locking him into the vaults.

A dirt road through the fields next to the ruins is named Chemin de la Dame Blanche. In addition, a street about one kilometer to the North of the ruins bears the name Chemin de la Dame, a bus stop at its junction with the main street is called Vésenaz, La Dame. Some two and a half kilometers to the South in the municipality of Vandœuvres another street is named Chemin de la Blanche. The neighbouring municipality of Choulex still bears the name of the family, whose lineage Humbert as the first lord of the castle was from and which was first mentioned in a document almost nine hundred years ago.

In late September 2019, the Geneva Chamber Orchestra performed a series of five concerts in the inner court of the castle ruins. The collaboration by four Geneva-born and/or -based artists, included a video installation and was titled Qui a Peur de la Dame Blanche?:

Who is afraid of the White Lady?

=== Thailand ===
Although the image of a white lady is not traditionally part of Thai ghost lore, a story appeared on local TV that claimed several unnamed teenagers "died in separate, unexplained accidents" after passing by a house in Bangkok's Thawi Watthana district, unnamed "witnesses" reported seeing a woman in white at the scene, and "a psychic' later claimed a vengeful spirit named "Dao" or "Deuan" was responsible.

=== United Kingdom ===
==== England ====
Thirteen tales within England also suggest that the White Lady may be a victim of murder or suicide who died before she could tell anyone the location of some hidden treasure. In the early 1900's, the castle of Blenkinsopp in Northumberland was occupied by a family. One night the parents woke to their boy screaming, "The White Lady!" By the time they arrived at his bedside, she had vanished. However, the boy reported that the lady had been angry and tried to take him away after he refused to accompany her to a box of gold buried in the vaults below. She could not rest while it was there. The same events took place the following three nights. When the child began sleeping with his parents, the White Lady no longer disturbed him, but he never again traveled through the castle alone for fear of her.

The White Lady (also known as the "Running Lady") of Beeford, East Yorkshire resides on the "Beeford Straight," a stretch of road between Beeford and Brandesburton. Motorists have reported her apparition running across the Beeford Straight toward the junction of North Frodingham. Anecdotal tales also report a motorcyclist picking up a female hitchhiker on the same stretch of road. A few miles later, the motorcyclist, upon turning around, noticed the passenger had vanished. In one instance, a car crashed into a tree, killing six people. It is rumored to be the white lady's curse.

In another story, a White Lady is seen retracing her steps; she was said to have jumped off the Portchester Castle while trying to retrieve her fallen child. Her spirit is said to haunt the castle.

At Worstead Church in Norfolk, there are stories of ghostly woman in white. Her story is diverse, from being a good ghost to a ghost who brings death to people. She is known locally as "White Lady" and her stories are said to have been around since the 1830s. Said that she often appears during Christmas Eve. The most famous case occurred in 1975, when Peter Berthelot and his wife Diane visited a church to shelter from the heat, and Peter took a photo of ill Diane sitting in a pew inside, with a vague image of a woman in old-fashioned white with a bonnet sitting behind her. After that, she recovered from her illness.

An old ballad is sung about a ghost, that is haunting Okehampton Castle: "My Ladye hath a sable coach, with horses two an four. My Ladye hath a gaunt blood-hound, that goeth before. My Ladye's coach hath nodding plumes, the driver hath no head. My Ladye is an ashen white – as one who is long dead."This lady is said to be a Howard-lady of the 17th century, who has murdered several husbands and children of hers. Her curse is to collect grassblades in the castle ruins until the end of time. No historical event or person could be found to correlate.

The ghost of a Pomeroy-lady called Matilda (also called Margaret) is told to haunt Berry Pomeroy Castle (near to Totnes in Devon) as a harbinger of death to everyone to see her in the dungeon of the St.Margaret-tower. Matilda is said to have been starved to death by her sister in that dungeon. Edward Montague created a novel titled "The Castle of Berry Pomeroy".

==== Wales ====
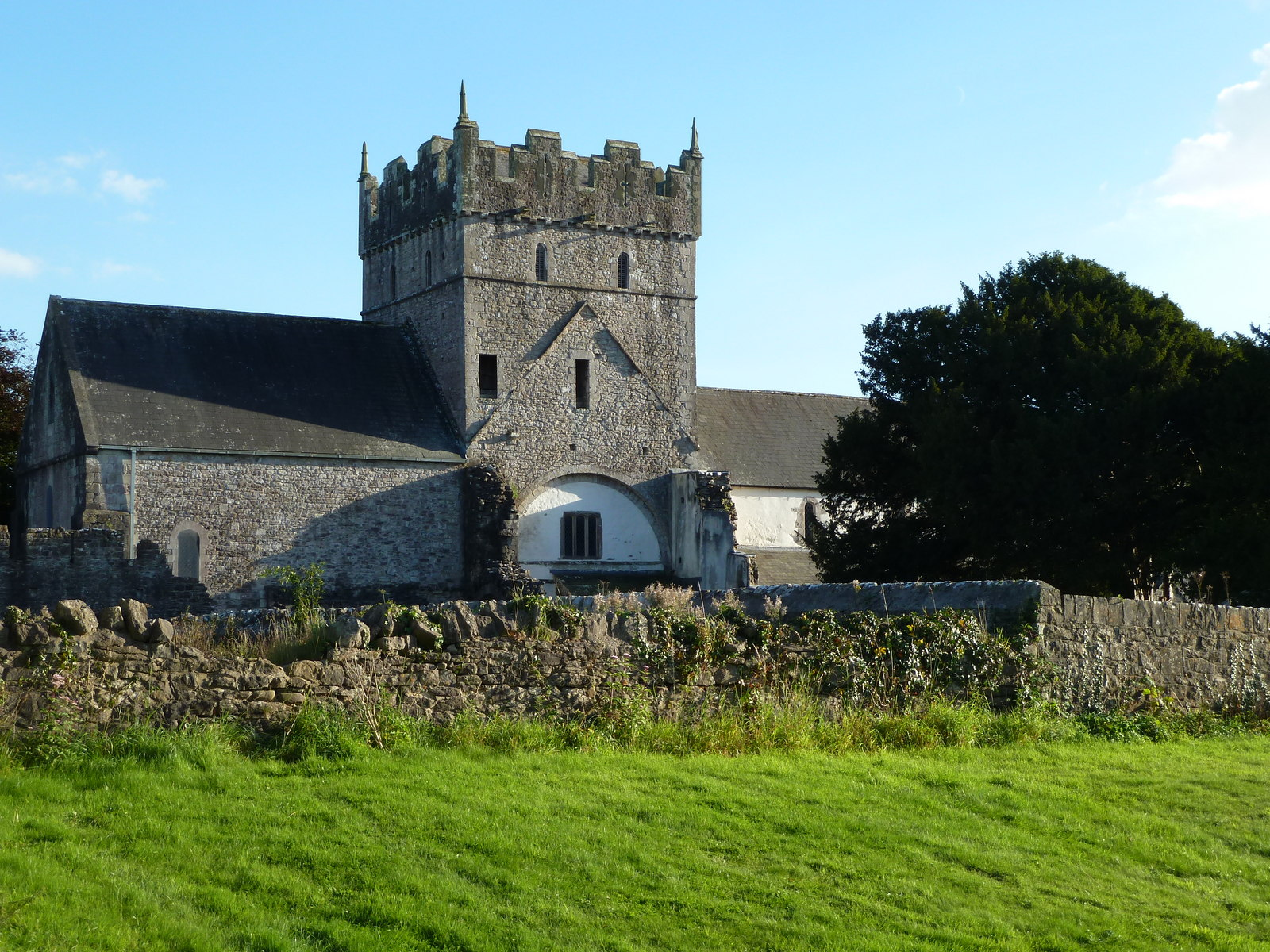
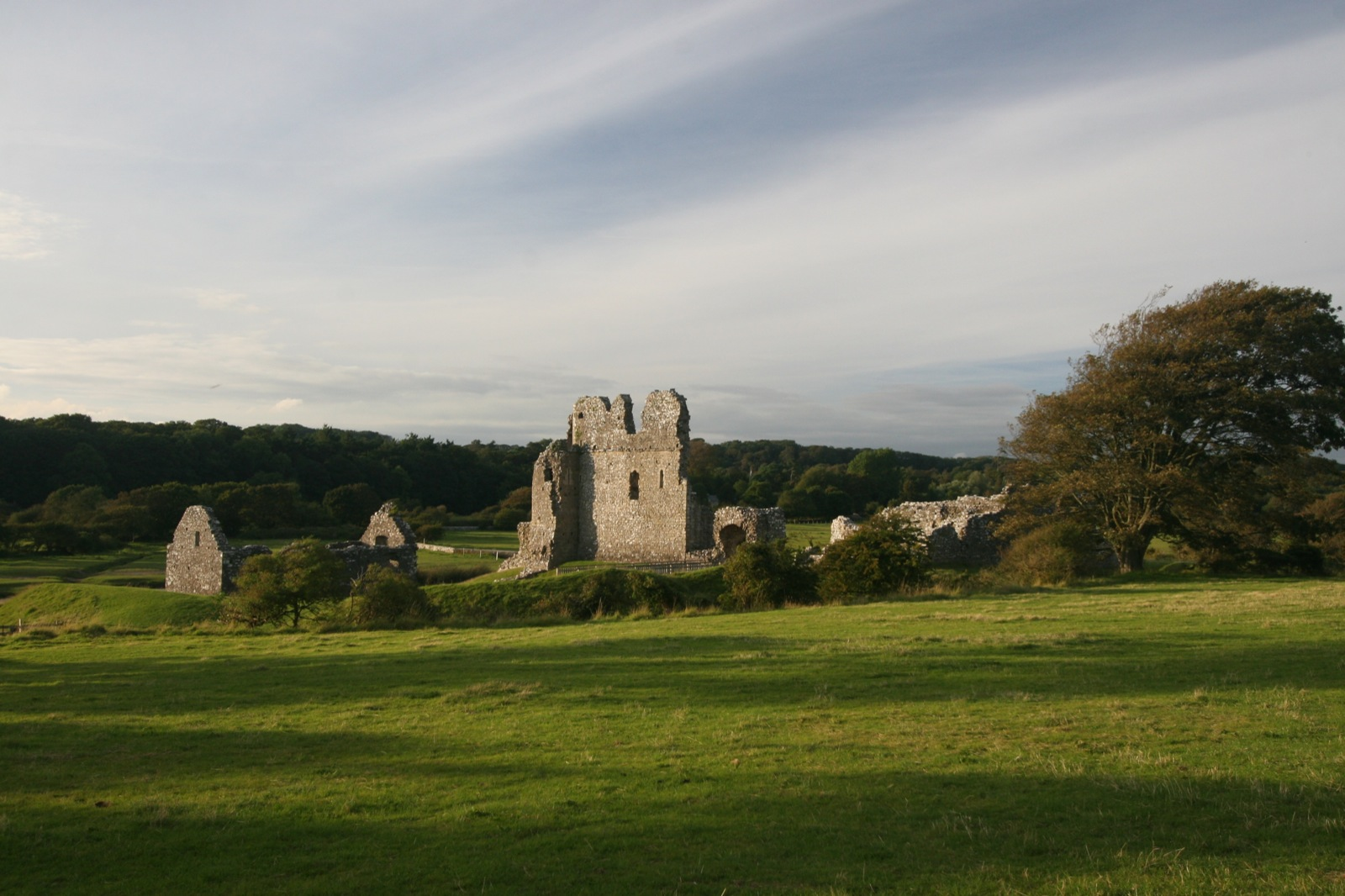
locations such as Ewenny Priory (left) and the ruins of Ogmore Castle have separate traditions of Y Ladi Wen.

Y Ladi Wen (The White Lady) or Dynes Mewn Gwyn (Woman in white) is a common apparition in the Celtic Mythology of Wales and Welsh folklore. Dressed in white, and most common at Calan Gaeaf (the Welsh Halloween), she was often evoked to warn children about bad behaviour. Y Ladi Wen is characterized in various ways including being a terrifying ghost who may ask for help if you speak to her.

Y Ladi Wen is also associated with restless spirits guarding hidden treasures, with perhaps the best-known example of this at Ogmore, Bridgend. The Ogmore apparition story is also noteworthy for containing many of the archetypal aspects common to such Celtic and Welsh stories, including a hidden cauldron, changing physical characteristics, and a chastising morality. Here, a spirit was long said to wander the area until a man finally approached her. When such a man eventually did so, the spirit led him to a treasure (a cauldron filled with gold) hidden under a heavy stone within the old tower of Ogmore Castle and allowed the man to take half the treasure for himself. However, the man later returned and took more of the treasure. This angered the spirit, who, with her fingers turning into claws, attacked the man as he returned home. The man became gravely ill but only died once he had confessed his greed. After that, an ailment known as Y Ladi Wen's revenge was said to befall any person who died before disclosing hidden treasure.

Welsh topography inspired by sightings and tales of Y Ladi Wen can be found throughout Wales. The village of Ewenny has both a White Lady's Meadow and White Lady's Lane, and St Athan also has a tradition of Y Ladi Wen.

=== United States ===
A White Lady is said to haunt Durand-Eastman Park in Rochester, New York. Also known as the Lady in the Lake, the 19th-century White Lady wanders the park area, obsessively looking for her daughter's body. The latter was slain by a boyfriend or group of hoodlums, depending on the story you hear. Legend has it that the human White Lady either killed herself in grief, or died alone and heartbroken.

"The Lady in White" or the "White Lady of Avenel" is the most commonly reported apparition at Avenel (Bedford, Virginia). The apparition is thought to be Mary Frances "Fran" Burwell, of the Burwell family of Virginia. "The legend has it that she stayed on the front porch waiting for her husband to come home from the Civil War, but he never did," says Adam Stupin, founder of SouthWest Virginia Ghost Hunters.

"The Ghostly Sphinx of Metedeconk" by Stephen Crane recounts the tale of a White Lady whose lover was drowned in 1815.

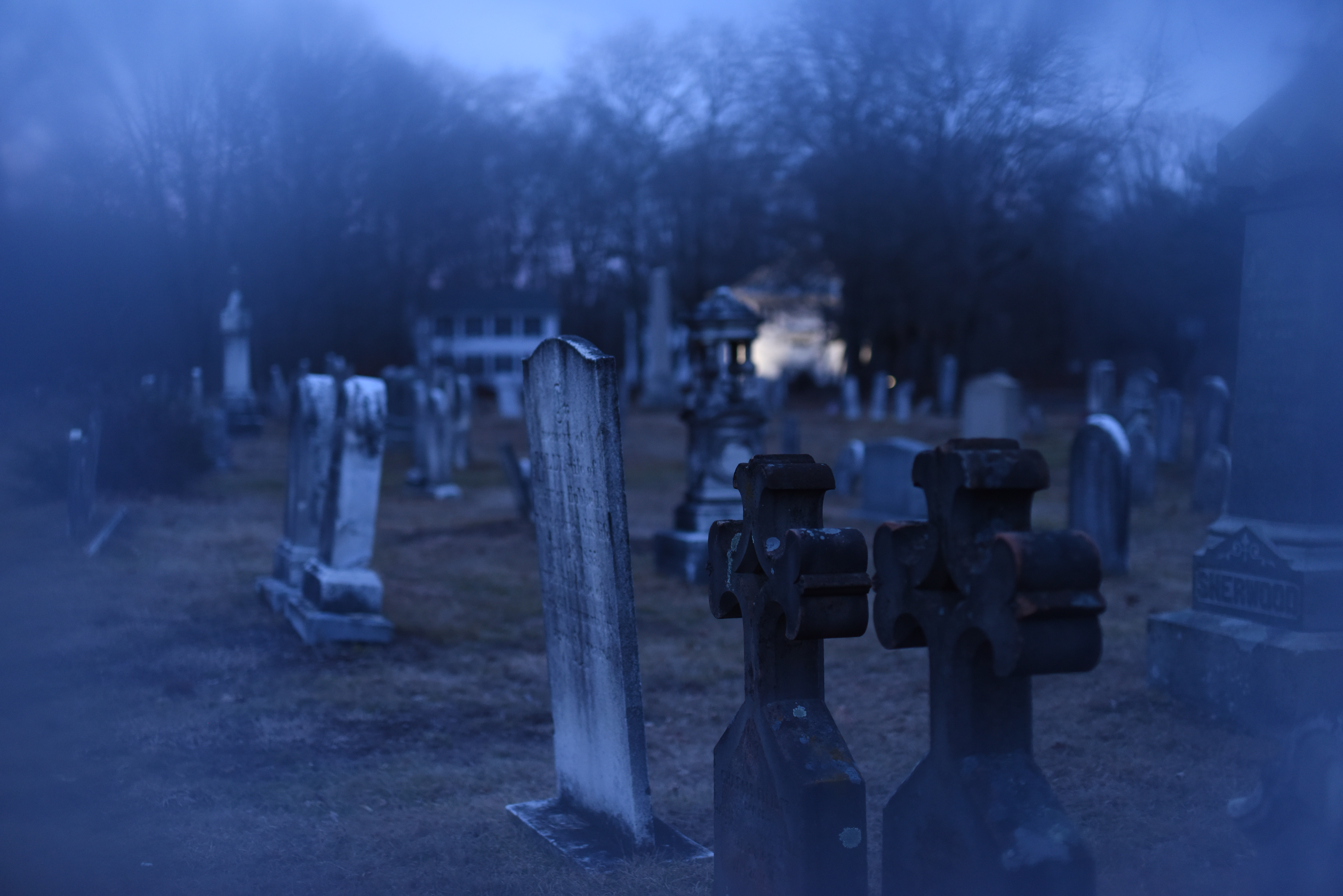
Union Cemetery at early night

Union Cemetery in Easton, Connecticut, has reported sightings of a white lady since the late 1940s, said to haunt the nearby Stepney Cemetery in Monroe, Connecticut.

In Altoona, Pennsylvania, she is known as the White Lady of Whopsy. Her ghost is said to haunt Wopsononock Mountain and Buckhorn Mountain in the western part of Altoona. It's said that she and her husband had an ill-fated crash over what's known as Devil's Elbow as you head into the city itself where both of them tumbled over the side of the mountain. According to legend, she is seen looking for her husband on foggy nights, has been picked up as a hitchhiker, and her reflection is not seen in the mirror, but she always disappears around Devil's Elbow.

In Fremont, California, there are two instances of the White Lady Legend. One known as the White Witch and the other simply known as the Prom Dress Girl. Both legends have ghost sightings in the Niles Canyon Area. The White Witch story is about a woman named Lowerey. She was one of the first people in the area killed in a horse carriage accident in the early 20th century. People claim to have seen her in a cemetery in the area with strange lights. Local legend says you can see her walking the ridge between the Niles Hollywood-style sign and the canyon. The Prom Dress Girl story is about a high school girl who gets in a car accident on February 26 somewhere around in the late 20th century. Sightings of her claim she wears a white prom dress and tries to hitch a ride from passing by vehicles on the route 84 highway between Fremont, California, and Sunol, California.

In Dallas, Texas at White Rock Lake Park, it is reported that the ghost of a twenty-year-old looking girl, known as "The Lady of White Rock Lake" described as wearing a water-soaked 1930s evening dress, who usually appears at night along the roadside of East Lawther Drive. Witnesses claim the phantom asks to be taken to her home on Gaston Avenue in Dallas before disappearing in the car during the ride and leaving behind a waterlogged car seat. Legend claims the woman to be a drowning victim from a boating accident in the 1930s. Reports of the ghostly encounters were published in Dallas-area newspapers in the 1960s.

== See also ==
- Apparitional experience
- Lady in Red
- La Llorona
- List of ghosts
- Sayona
