= Baobh-shìth =

Female fairy in Scottish Highlands folklore

The baobh-shìth (Scottish Gaelic pronunciation: [ˈpɤːv ˈhiː], literally "fairy witch" or "fairy hag" in Scottish Gaelic, plural baobhan-sìth Scottish Gaelic pronunciation: [ˈpɤːvan ˈʃiː]) is a female fairy in the folklore of the Scottish Highlands, though they also share certain characteristics in common with the succubus. They appear as beautiful women who seduce their victims before attacking them and killing them.

== Folklore ==
There are numerous stories about the baobhan-sìth with a general theme of hunters being attacked in the wilderness at night. In the tale recorded by Mackenzie, there were four men who went hunting and took shelter for the night in a lonely shieling or hut. One of the men supplied vocal music while the others began dancing. The men expressed a desire for partners to dance with, and soon after that four women entered the hut. Katharine Briggs suggested that the baobhan-sìth was unable to catch the fourth man among the horses because of the iron with which the horses were shod, iron being a traditional fairy vulnerability.

In a similar tale one of the men noticed that the women had deer hooves instead of feet and fled from them. He returned the next morning to find that the other hunters had their "throats cut and chests laid open".

In a third story the hunters took refuge in a cave. Each of the men said he wished his own sweetheart were there that night, but one of them, named Macphee, who was accompanied by his black dog, said he preferred his wife to remain at home. At that moment a group of young women entered the cave, and the men who had wished for their sweethearts were killed. Macphee was protected by his dog who drove the women from the cave.

One recurring motif in these stories is that the baobhan-sìth appear almost immediately after the hunters express their desire for female companionship. This is connected with a traditional Scottish belief that if one were to make a wish at night without also invoking God's protection, then that wish would be granted in some terrible manner.

== In popular culture ==
- The baobhan-sìth have appeared on a number of occasions in author Mark Chadbourn's fantasy trilogies The Age of Misrule, The Dark Age, and Kingdom of the Serpent.
- They appear in Faerie Tale by Raymond E. Feist where they are portrayed as evil fairies of the Unseelie Court, who (aside from their great beauty) possess a strong compelling magic which they use to force solitary males in isolated locations to follow them to their deaths.
- Desdemona, an Oriental dancer and commander of the Fae army in Amy Hoff's Scottish urban fantasy series Caledonia, is a baobha- shìth.
- In Night and Silence, the twelfth installment of Seanan McGuire's October Daye series, the protagonist is attacked and repeatedly bitten by a starving baobh-shìth. In this portrayal, a baobh-shìth is able to mimic both the appearance and supernatural abilities of anyone whose blood she has recently consumed.
- A baobh-shìth appears as an adversary in the Fighting Fantasy gamebook "Vault of the Vampire".
- In The Book of Life from the All Souls Trilogy, the baobh-shìth was said to have been inspired by Janet Gowdie, a Vampire-Witch hybrid and daughter of the real falsely accused witch Isobel Gowdie and a vampire named Nickie-Ben.
- Scarlett Johansson's character in Under the Skin is thought to be loosely based on the legend of baobhan-sìth.

== See also ==
- Banshee
- Dames Blanches
- Deer Woman
- Glaistig
- Hulder
- Leanan sídhe
- Patasola
- Rusalka
- Samodiva
- Sayona
- Sundel Bolong
- Aicha Kandicha
