= Dames blanches =

Spirits in French mythology

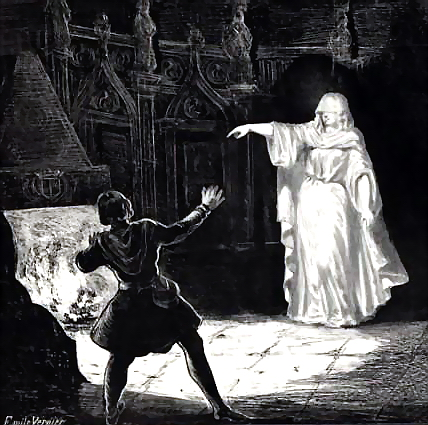
- Illustration for the opera La dame blanche

Creature information
- Grouping: Ghost; Fairy
- Sub grouping: White lady
- Similar entities: Weiße Frauen

Origin
- Country: France

In French mythology or folklore, Dames Blanches (meaning literally White Ladies) are spirits frequently seen in French folklore and horror, comparable to the Weiße Frauen of both Dutch and German mythology.

== Description ==
Dames Blanches are most commonly described as spectral women wearing all white. They are sometimes considered a type of malevolent Fée or ghost and can be found in ravines, on bridges, or along roads. A Dame Blanche may require passerby to dance with or help her in some way before they are allowed to go on safely. In other versions, the Dame Blanche will force the passerby to dance until they die of exhaustion.

Dames Blanches are also sometimes thought to appear as a warning of road hazards, and if a driver does not greet her than they will be more likely to die in an accident. Another version of Dames Blanches are as spirits that protect treasure in castles. They are often considered a harbinger of death.

== Legends ==
=== In France ===
La Dame d'Apringy is described as a Dame Blanche who appeared in a ravine at the Rue Quentin at Bayeux in Normandy, where one must dance with her a few rounds to pass. Those who refused were thrown into the thistles and briar, while those who danced were not harmed. Another Dame was known on a narrow bridge in the district of Falaise, named the Pont d'Angot. She only allowed people to pass if they went on their knees to her. Anyone who refused was tormented by the lutins, cats, owls, and other creatures who helped her.

Another legend is that of Noelle, the fictitious daughter of Raymond VI. It is said she took refuge in the castle with her lover whom her father disapproved of and when soldiers went looking for them, they couldn't find her. She is believed to have become the Dame Blanche of Thouzon, and can be seen in the castle during the full moon.

=== In Canada ===
In Quebec, there are stories of a Dame Blanche at Montmorency Falls. It is believed that this is the spirit of a young woman named Mathilde. Mathilde had was engaged to a soldier named Louis, but he had been called to battle on the day of their wedding. The Quebec army was victorious, but when Mathilde went to the battlefield to congratulate Louis she found him dead. Distraught, she threw herself over the falls while still in her wedding gown.

== Origins ==
J. A. MacCulloch believes Dames Blanches are one of the recharacterizations of pre-Christian female goddesses, and suggested their name Dame may have derived from the ancient guardian goddesses known as the Matres, by looking at old inscriptions to guardian goddesses, specifically inscriptions to "the Dominæ, who watched over the home, perhaps became the Dames of mediæval folk-lore."

== See also ==
- La dame blanche (opera)
- Mont Blanc, nicknamed La Dame Blanche
- Moura Encantada
- Weiße Frauen
- White Goddess (Pan-European deity, posited by Robert Graves)
- White Lady, a type of ghost
- White Woman (disambiguation)
- Witte Wieven
- Witte Wiwer
