= Witte Wieven =

Spirits in Dutch mythology

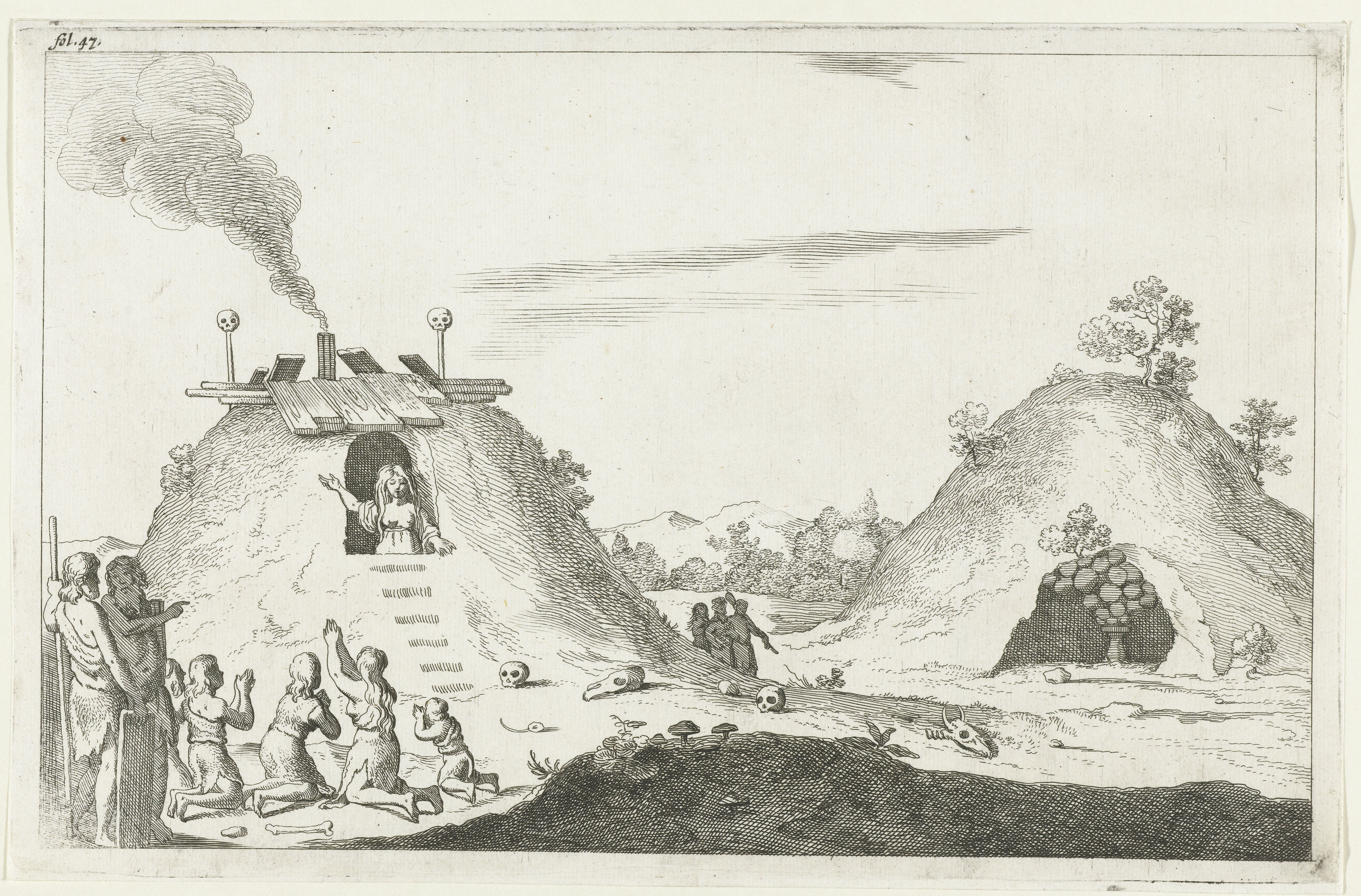
1660 etching depicting "Witte Wieven" living in tumuli

In (low) Saxon mythology and legends, the Witte Wieven (also known as Wittewijven) are spirits of "wise women" (or else elven beings). The mythology dates back at least to the pre-Christian era (7th century) and was known in the present-day regions of the Netherlands, Belgium and parts of France. In some places they were known as Juffers or Joffers ("ladies"), or as Dames Blanches (White Ladies) in French.

== Origins ==
Witte wieven, originating from modern Dutch Low Saxon, literally translates to "white women." These women are commonly associated with wisdom, so despite the literal translation, the interpretation of the term "witte" as meaning wise rather than white is common. In Standard Dutch, "wit" or "witte" solely denotes the color white. While the terms "wit" and "white" do not share the same linguistic root, regional pronunciations in the Netherlands of the corresponding words can sound very similar. This phonetic resemblance might have contributed to the association. Color symbolism of whiteness with purity possibly play a role as well, although contemporary color symbolism tends to link wisdom to the color blue rather than white.

Similar folk traditions outside the Netherlands show that the connotation of wisdom associated with "Witte wieven" might indeed have emerged at a later stage. For instance, in French folklore, these entities are referred to as Dames blanches, directly translating to "white ladies". Another parallel can be drawn with the White Goddess, a concept argued to exist more broadly in Wales, Ireland, most of Western Europe as well as the ancient Middle East.

Historically, the witte wieven are thought to be wise female herbalists and medicine healers who took care of people's physical and mental ailments. It was said they had the talent for prophecy and looking into the future. They had a high status in the communities, and so when they died ceremonies were held at their grave sites to honour them.

According to mythology, their spirits remained on earth, and they became living spirits (or elven beings) that either helped or hindered people who encountered them. They tended to reside in the burial sites or other sacred places. It was thought that mist on a gravehill was the spirit of the wise woman appearing, and people would bring them offerings and ask for help.

While many scholars believe Witte Wieven originated as above from honoring graves of wise women, others think the mythology of witte wieven come from part of the Germanic belief in disen, land wights, and/or alven (Dutch for "elf") for several reasons: The practice of bringing offerings and asking for help from their graves is very similar to honoring disen, land wights and alfen in Germanic paganism. In addition, in some localities the mythological witte wieven were described directly as "Alfen" or "Alven".

Jacob Grimm mentioned them in the Deutsche Mythologie (1835) as the Dutch variant of the German Weiße Frauen: "The people of Friesland, Drenthe and the Netherlands have just as much to tell of their witten wijven or juffers in hills and caverns ... though here they get mixed up with elvish personages."

== Characterization ==
At first, early medieval literature described the witte wieven more like pranksters and pests. Later Christian teaching transformed the idea of a "witte wieven" into mistflarden (wisps of mist or fog): ghost witches — recharacterized as evil and to be avoided.

In certain legends "Alvinne" was a ghost in a white cloak.

== Legacy ==
The following places were named after witte wieven, and report witte wieven legends:

In the Netherlands:

- Near the Village of Eefde is Wittewievenbult: this translates as "White Women Hill". Local legend holds that White Women appear on Christmas Eve every year and dance on this hill.
- Near the Village of Barchem is Wittewijvenkuil: this translates as "White Women Pit". It is a pit between two local hills. Local legend holds that three white women lived there.

== See also ==
- Dames Blanches (White Ladies of French mythology, similar)
- Völva
- Weiße Frauen (White Women of German mythology, similar)
- White Goddess (book by Robert Graves)
- White women (disambiguation)
- Witte Wiwer (name given to similar spirits in parts of Lower Saxony in Northwestern Germany)

== Sources ==
- Grimm, Jacob (1835). Deutsche Mythologie (German Mythology); From English released version Grimm's Teutonic Mythology (1888); Available online by Northvegr © 2004-2007, Chapter 32, page 3.
- Reginheim. Heathen History of the Achterhoek. 2002. Files retrieved 02-24-2007
- Reginheim. Witte wieven. 2007. (in English) File retrieved 03-08-2007.
