= Weiße Frauen =

Elven-like spirits in German folklore

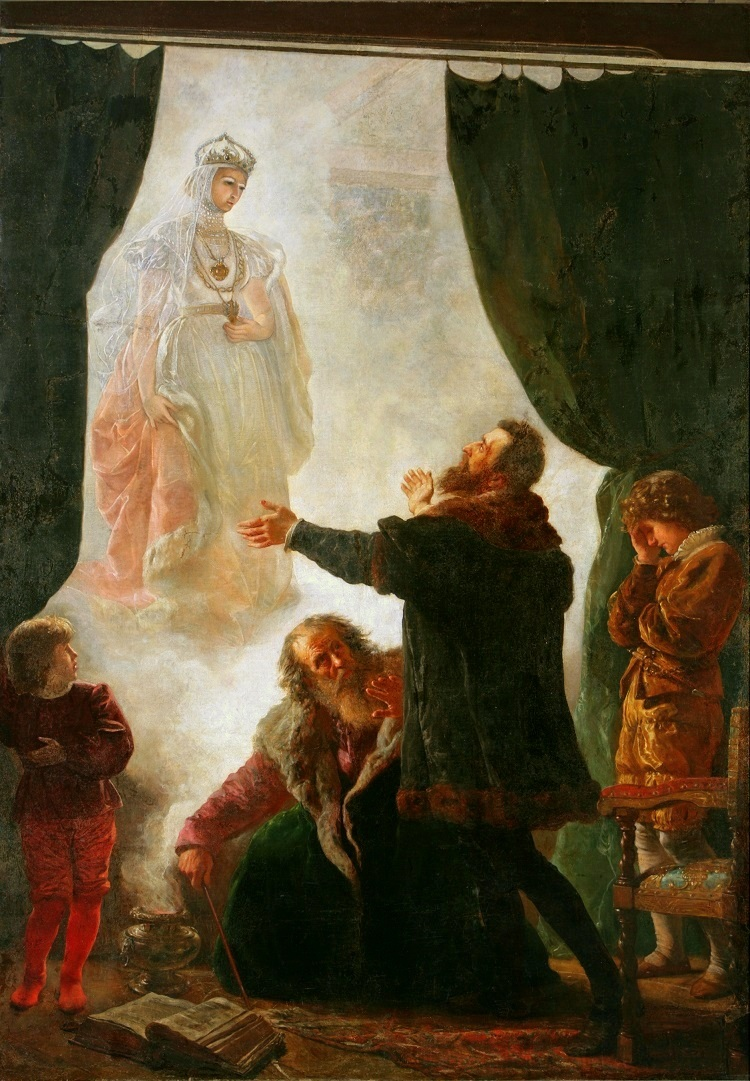
The ghost of Barbara Radziwiłł, oil on canvas, 281 x 189 cm. National Museum in Poznań, Date 1886.

In German folklore, the Weiße Frauen (German: [ˈvaɪsə ˈfʁaʊən], meaning White Women) are elf-like spirits which may derive from Germanic paganism in the form of legends of light elves (Old Norse: Ljósálfar). The Dutch Witte Wieven are traceable at least as far back as the 7th century, and their mistranslation as White Women instead of the original Wise Women can be explained by the Dutch word wit also meaning white. They are described as beautiful and enchanted creatures who appear at noon and can be seen sitting in the sunshine brushing their hair or bathing in a brook. They may be guarding treasure or haunting castles. They entreat mortals to break their spell, but this is always unsuccessful. The mythology dates back at least to the Middle Ages and was known in the present-day area of Germany.

== Origins ==
Weiße Frauen literally means "white ladies" in German. The association with the color white and their appearance in sunlight is thought by Jacob Grimm to stem from the original Old Norse and Teutonic mythology of alven (elves), specifically the bright Ljósálfar. These "light elves" lived in Álfheim (part of heaven) under the fertility god Freyr. As mythology evolved, elves no longer lived in Álfheim but lived on earth in nature. The White Women also may represent ancient beliefs in ancestral spirits or older native goddesses and nature spirits, such as the Idis for example. Jacob Grimm noted in particular they might come from Holda, "Berhta, white by her very name" and Ostara. According to Grimm's Teutonic Mythology and to the Mythology of All Races Series, the enchantment under which they suffer "may be a symbol of the ban laid by Christianity on the divinities of the older faith." Similar in name to the Witte Wieven of Dutch mythology, the Weiße Frauen may have come from the Germanic belief in disen or land wights and alven.

== Related beings ==
Grimm notes the image of the Weiße Frauen basking in the sun and bathing "melts into the notion of a water-holde [i.e. Holda] and nixe". The Weiße Frauen also have counterparts in both name and characterization in neighboring countries: In the Netherlands they are known as the Witte Wieven, and in France as the Dames Blanches. Their Low German equivalent are the Witte Wiwer.

There are also many legends in German folklore regarding Weiße Frauen, which are actually equivalent to the legends of White Ladies, ghosts of the United Kingdom. In the Alpine regions of Austria and Southern Germany they are called Salige Frauen or just Salige (Salkweiber, Salaweiber).

== See also ==
- Fänggen – Gigantic female wood sprites from Tyrolean folklore
- Salige Frau - regional variant of the Weiße Frau

== Sources ==
- Bellows, Henry Adams. Grimnismol. The Poetic Edda (Princeton: Princeton UP, 1936), pp. 85–107.
- Crossley-Holland, Kevin. The Norse Myths. New York: Pantheon, 1980.
- Grimm, Jacob (1835). Deutsche Mythologie (German Mythology); From English released version Grimm's Teutonic Mythology (1888); Available online by Northvegr © 2004–2007, Chapter 32, pages 2-3.
- Marshall Jones Company (1930). Mythology of all Races Series, Volume 2 Eddic, Great Britain: Marshall Jones Company, 1930, pp. 221–222.
- Reginheim. Witte wieven. 2002. (in English) File retrieved 03-08-2007.
