= Witte Wiwer =

Female spirits in North German folklore

The witte Wiwer, (Note: The grammatically correct form would be witten Wiwer with definite article and witte Wiwer either with indefinite article or without article. Since there are no comparable adjective changes in the English language, this article uses the indeterminate form as standard form for any German language terms were such grammatical rules apply.) witte Wîwer, witte Wiewer or witte Wiver (pronounced [ˈvɪtə ˈviːvɐ]; all meaning 'white women' in Low German; Standard German: weiße Weiber, pronounced [ˈvaɪsə ˈvaɪbɐ]; sg. witt Wif or weißes Weib) are legendary creatures from (Low) German folklore similar to but distinct from the weiße Frauen. Other names are unterirdische Weiber (subterranean women) in Mecklenburg and Sibyllen (sibyls; sg. Sibylle) in Northwestern Germany.

The witte Wiwer of Mecklenburg dwell in the earth, under shrubs, in small hills, in forest clearings, or beneath the roots of old trees. They might also live beneath the cow stable in some places in Mecklenburg. In Westphalia, the witte Wiwer dwell in a pit with a clear fountain inside surrounded by a grove which is called the Wittewiwerskule (white women's pit), otherwise described as a cave with a door. They are also said to dwell in mountains. On the island of Rügen, they further use subterranean tunnels to get from one place to another.

The witte Wiwer play merry music and have very fine voices. They exchange unbaptized newborn children for changelings (German Wechselbälge, sg. Wechselbalg) if there is no light burning beside the cradle at night, warding them off. They might also take away women just out of childbed and bring them to their dwelling, threatening the woman to stay there or else they would wring her neck.

The witte Wiwer might ask to borrow the brewing copper every new moon during twilight hour, taking it away unseen if obliged. Three evenings later, they will return it the very same hour filled with some cans of the beer brewed by them as payment. They might also ask to get some sweet porridge, too, if a wedding takes place in somebody's house.

They are chased by the wild hunt (German wilde Jagd) from which they flee with flying hair. The wild hunt consists of the wilde Jägerin (wild huntswoman) and her pack of hounds. The wild huntswoman, known as de oll Fru Waur (the old Lady Waur) or de oll Węderhex Waur (the old hag [literally: weather-witch] Waur), carries the witte Wiwer she caught off on her horse, either one placed before her or – if she has caught two of them – with their hair bound together, hanging from the horse. If the witt Wif flees from Fru Waur unkempt, unwashed, and sweaty, the wild huntress will first need to wash up to catch her, using her own water and drying off with her long hunting dress. This seems corrupted, for usually it is the wild huntsman who has not washed up yet and thus has no power over his victims rather than them being unwashed.

When the witte Wiwer of Mönchgut in Rügen were driven away, the oak tree connected to them withered. They prophesied their return when the withered oak would sprout again.

== Literature ==
- Karl Bartsch: Sagen, Märchen und Gebräuche aus Mecklenburg: Erster Band. Vienna 1879. (reprint: Holzinger, Berlin 2013, ISBN 978-1-48231-586-8)
- Eckstein: Grütze. In: Hanns Bächtold-Stäubli, Eduard Hoffmann-Krayer: Handwörterbuch des Deutschen Aberglaubens: Band 3 Freen-Hexenschuss. Berlin 1931. (reprint: Walter de Gruyter, Berlin/New York 2000, ISBN 978-3-11-016860-0)
- Wilhelm Mannhardt: Wald- und Feldkulte: Band I. Berlin 1904. (reprint: Elibron Classics, 2005, ISBN 978-1-42124740-3)
- Leander Petzold: Deutsche Volkssagen. Marix Verlag, Wiesbaden 2007, ISBN 978-3-86539-138-4.
- Peuckert: Sibylle. In: Hanns Bächtold-Stäubli, Eduard Hoffmann-Krayer: Handwörterbuch des Deutschen Aberglaubens: Band 7 Pflügen-Signatur. Berlin 1936. (reprint: Walter de Gruyter, Berlin/New York 2000, ISBN 978-3-11-016860-0)
- Seemann: Musik. In: Hanns Bächtold-Stäubli, Eduard Hoffmann-Krayer: Handwörterbuch des Deutschen Aberglaubens: Band 6 Mauer-Pflugbrot. Berlin 1935. (reprint: Walter de Gruyter, Berlin/New York 2000, ISBN 978-3-11-016860-0)
