= Samodiva (folklore) =

Woodland Fairies

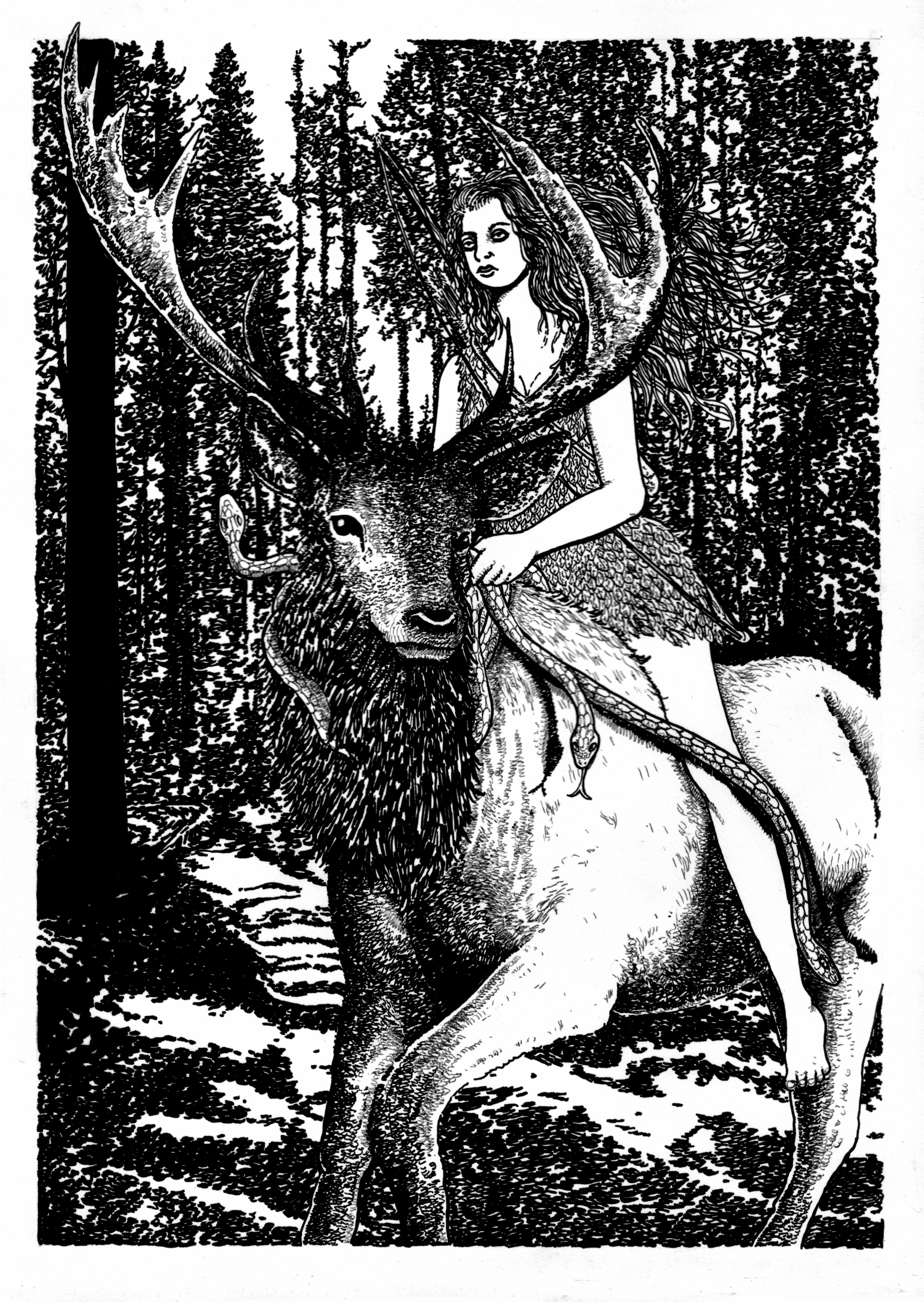
A vila mounted on a stag, holding serpents (as riding equipment). —Drawing by Andy Paciorek

The samodiva (Bulgarian: самодива; plural: samodivi самодиви), samovila (самовила; plural: samovili самовили) or vila (вила; plural: vili вили), are fairies, wood nymphs, or harmful female demons found in South Slavic folklore (mostly Bulgarian and Macedonian).

They are described as beautiful women with long flowing tresses of blonde or red hair. They wear white dresses and various other articles of clothing (white veils, wreathes, green sash) said to confer them their supernatural powers (or ability to fly); sometimes they themselves are said to be equipped with wings. One recurring theme in folklore is of a man (shepherd, prince, etc.) able to rob a samodiva of her veil, (Note: A long draping bridal veil (було).) wreathe, etc. to capture her, and force her to become his bride (§ Samodiva bride).

Their secret home occurs at a place associated with high elevation, or bodies of water, or woodland, usually in combination, e.g. a spring on a mountain, or a beechwood grove by a lake where they bathe, or else treetops, or caves, or derelict churches, etc.

Superstition cautions that one should fear trespassing upon their territory, particularly to draw water at night, and the encroacher may be stricken with illness, death, or some other suffering as consequence. Sometimes, a victim is often chosen to be spirited away (§ Abductions and deaths).

It is also explained that these fairies demand humans as labor to construct their homes, or as entertainers if they are flautists or skilled in chain dance (hora), or as caretakers of their children. A more blood-gory piece of lore contends that humans are used as building materials for their castle.

The samodivi are said to retreat to their "dragon village" at the edge of the world to spend their autumns and winters. Only the bird-kind (magpies, eagles) can otherwise reach this place.

These fairies are also said to be pluckers of eyeballs, causing blindness to trespassers, etc., but folklore tells of the victim's son being able to outwit the fairies and recover the eyesight to his father (§ Samovila as eye-snatcher).

The fairies are also very fond of song and dance. They often engage a human in a contest to see which can outlast the other in dancing versus playing of music. This presents an opportunity of folklore protagonists to gain advantage or boon from the fairies. The fairies also have their special dancing arena, often described as a circular patch of beaten down grass somewhere in a clearing in the forest.

== Nomenclature ==
The term samovila (Church Slavonic: самовила) is found used in the 15th century in Bulgaria. The homily Slovo kako zachasya samovila (Слово како зачася самовила "A Tale of How a Samovila Is Conceived") from a 15–16th century miscellany glosses the samovila as something like the Greek Nereid (cf. § Comparative analysis).

The reference to samodiva (самодива) occurs in Avram Dimitrievich's collection (Avram's Miscellany) dated 1674, where it warns against drinking uncovered water on the observance of the Massacre of the Innocents (December 28/29), since on that day the samodivi will spit or vomit in the wells. (Note: Vakarelski (1977) citing Tsonev, B. Б. Цонев (1920) Опис на славянските ръкописи в софийската народна библиотека [Catalogue of the Slavic manuscripts in the National Library in Sofia] Sofia: National Library, p. 175.)

Preferred use of the term samovila is prevalent in Eastern Serbia, Western Bulgaria and Macedonia; as for Bulgaria, samodiva tends to be referred to as samovilla on the western side of Strandja (Strandzha) Mountain.

=== Etymology ===
The terms samodiva (pl. samodivi 'wood nymph') and samovila/samovilla (pl. samovila/samovilla 'fairy') are essentially synonymous. As for the samo- prefix, (Note: Even while само is a commonly used word meaning 'only, just'.) here it is explained to be a meaningless prefix merely serving to emphasize the meaning of the base. (Note: Usually the Bulgarian prefix само- applies to a verb, e.g. само-обвинявам се means 'self-accuse' or 'blame oneself' (where само- and the reflexive се are redundant). The Russian equivalent сам- (neut. само́ fem. сама́, 'oneself') is classed as emphatic pronoun (intensive pronoun) in another source.)

The etymology of -diva is uncertain. The main hypothesis is that there are traces of the Proto-Indo-European language *deiṷos, 'god', (Note: Georgieva: "Indo-European deiwos (god) or deiwa (goddess)...") and this PIE root is known to have led to designation of divine beings across languages (Sanskrit deva, Latin deus, Avestan daeva, Lithuanian dievas). The stem diva has also been glossed as meaning "Frightful".

The etymology of vila (cf. vila (fairy) § Etymology for further information) has also been traced to Proto-Indo-European lineage, but the particulars differ depending on the hypothesis, and the developmental history will be surveyed briefly, as follows. The stem vila has been etymologically linked to Lithuanian vyti (lit. 'chase, pursue'), and considered cognate with Sanskrit vī, vêti (lit. 'to go, drive') Potebnja in the 19th century. (Note: Potebnja (1879), p. 260 cited by Šteingolde (1999), p. 252) (Note: Although Russian sources generally cite Alexander A. Potebnja, Potebnja himself credits Serbian linguist Đuro Daničić for linking the Serbian vila with these lexemes.) This is explained as making rational sense, since she, the vila is a being who chases the clouds away. (Note: Goryayev (1896), p. 48, cited by Preobrazhensky (1914).) Potebnja also linked vila with the Slavic terms viti (вити, 'to wind around, twist') or veiu (вѣю, '[I] blow' (Note: Conjugation of вѣять≈веять 'to blow'.)), from which was deduced an ancestral link to Indo-European roots *ṷēi̭-, *ṷoi̭-, *ṷī- ('to drive, chase' (Note: Goryayev (1896) credits Potebnja. However and it may have been Pelikan (1929) who first formally proposed this (vide infra))) or perhaps *ṷēi̭- ('twist, turn'). (Note: Dukova (1983) credits Ferdinand Pelikán (1929) as the first to derive vila from *uei- with an additional consonant l extension; Here it is noted that *uei- denotes 'twist, turn' (drehen).) (Note: It has also been explained that vila may be traced to Indo-European root *ṷēi-, cognate with Slavic terms meaning 'profit'.) (Note: Similar etymology connects Old English wil "wile, trick" with Church Slavonic viti ("twist, wind, plait"), Lithuanian vejù ("turn, twist"), traced to [Indo-European] *ṷēi̭- root and Sanskrit vēti.) (cf. Vila (fairy) § Etymology for further detail).

The term vila is also explained as being connected to the concept of "unbridled will" or "wild/frenzied behavior"; (Note: Bulgarian: "на неограничена воля, на лудуване".) where the term is regarded as being related to the verb vilneya (вилнея, 'rage, bluster, storm, rampage, run wild') with other related words derived from the same root, such as vihar (вихър, 'whirlwind') or viyelitsa (виелица, 'blizzard').

Some popular writers gloss diva as meaning "wild, savage", and construe samodiva to mean "wild alone" or "free-savage[-girl]".

Another hypothesis proposes that samovila derives from Jambodula (Jamba), a Greco-Thracian deity.

=== Aliases ===
The term yuda/juda (юда /jo̟dɐ/; pl. yudi) is used synonymously (interchangeably (Note: That is to say, "samovilla" is also used in the western part of Strandzha as aforementioned.)) with samovila in the Strandzha Mountain; the samodiva is referred to as yuda/juda also in the Pirin Mountains, and the Western Rhodopes. The yuda/juda in these "Southern Baltic Slavic areas" (Note: This region is defined by Plotnikova to aforementioned Bulgaria zones (Rhodopo, Pirin, Thrace, Strandzha) as well as Southern Macedonia.) is considered a personification of the whirlwind that is quite similar to the samodiva or samaovila. But locally the yuda/juda denotes a much more sinister creature, e.g. in certain villages of Pirin, (Note: Pirin[ski] kraj (1980) and MDABYa, Uzeneva's notes; apud Plotnikova.) (Southern) Macedonia, (Note: Vražinovski (1995) apud Plotnikova.) and the Rhodopian village of Gela (Note: MDABYa, Sobolev's notes; apud Plotnikova.)

The term yuda derives from an Indo-European root associated with the sense of "quarrelsomeness", "excitement", "seduction", and "whirlwind". (Note: Bulgarian: "свадљивост, возбуденост, съблазняване, вихър".)

In Macedonia, "samovila" is used for the most part; less frequently "samodiva, vila, yuda/juda". One alias rarely used nowadays in modern times is majka/mayka (Macedonian: мајка, lit. 'mother'; plural: majki/mayki). In the past, people driven mad by fear were referred to by the expression "taken by the mayki". Note that in the Ukraine, the term mavka refers to the type of demon or spirit arisen from the soul of the dead (mainly a child or young woman), and in Slovenia she is called mavje.

=== Subtypes ===
There are various subtypes recognized according to their terrain. In Bulgarian lore, there is the samovila of the forest, gorska, samogorska (горске, самогорске); of the sea, morska (морске); and beyond the sea, prekomorska (прѣкоморске).

Similarly in Macedonian lore, the vila may carry corresponding epithets, such as samovila "of the forest* (gorska or samogorska (горска, самогорска), "of the sea" morska, "from overseas" prekumorska (прекуморска). Macedonian lore also name other subtypes such as oblakjinji облаќињи "cloud fairy", planinki планинки "mountain fairy" and ezerkinji езеркињи "lake fairy". This type of naming also occurs for the vila.

== Folklore ==
Samodivi are closely connected with natural landscape (cf. § Habitat). They can bring both harm and blessings to humans (see under § Folklore by country).

=== Physical description ===
The samodivi are described as being tall, with long flowing hair, either blonde or red-haired (auburn), and having pale skin complexion with a luminous sheen. In some cases, they are said to have wings which enable them to fly up to the clouds while riding a stag. Some sources say these wings grow out under their armpits. (Note: "С крила под мишниците".)

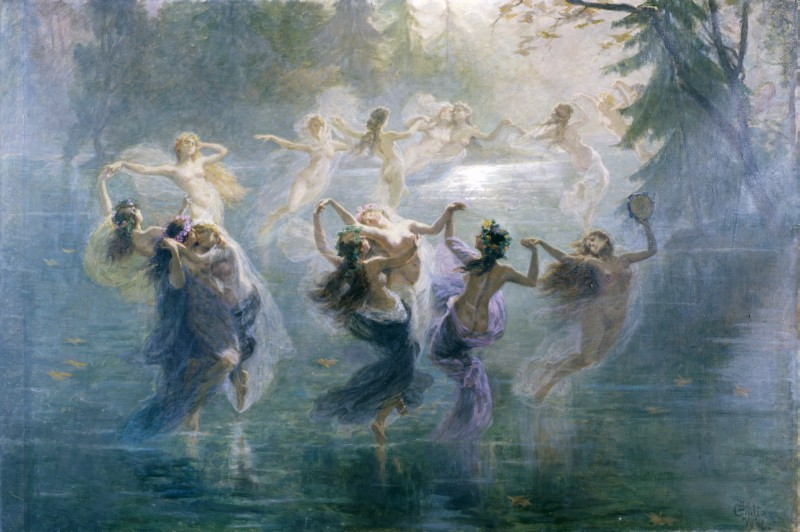
The Willis (i.e. the vili) by Bartolomeo Giuliano (1906) —Gallerie di Piazza Scala, Milan

The samodivi are said to dress in white, and girt with rainbow-colored belts/sashes, though it is the green color that predominates and noticed on these sashes. Sometimes, they are described as wearing a white veil (було; a long draping bridal veil, almost a dress) called "shadow" (syanka сянка) or "ray" (lŭch лъч), which could hold all their power. If they get deprived of their veil they lose all their power. They are also said to be rendered powerless if they lose the wreaths (венецът) which they wear on their heads These wreathes are woven out of samovila flowers (cf. the painting of the vili wearing wreathes, image right).

Their white gowns or various articles of clothing (i.e., a chemise, a dress (sukman, a gold-woven headscarf, their green sash, and a short sleeveless jacket, which are feathered) endow them with the power of flight, (Note: Cf. Kmietowitz: "The clothes play the same role as feather do for birds; therefore Samovilas fly only when they are clad") and in folktale, captured by mortal men who seize their clothing, as according to the swan maiden type tale where a man named Stoian/Stoyan traps a samodiva into marrying him by confiscating her magic garment; he becomes a despotic husband who treats her as chattel; she regains her clothes at the party celebrating the birth of a son borne by her, and departs (cf. § Samodiva bride below).

In folk song tradition, the samodiva is described as riding a light gray (Note: Bulgarian: sur сур.) stag, using snakes as rein to control her mount (cf. image top); (Note: The Serbian vila also rides a stag. Grimm attributes the riding a seven year-old stag bridled with snake to the (Serbian) vila (equivalent to Bulgarian samodiva according to footnote); he notes that such a description occurs for enchantresses i.e., the wolf-riding tröllkona or giantesses) in Norse literature.) she is also armed with bow and arrow. (Note: Georgieva (1993), p. 144, quoted in English by Zhivkov.) In song, Vida Bazdarzhikya (Вида Баздаржийкя) the samodiva (cf. Ivé and Vida, discussed below) rides a six-winged stag, harnessed with green serpent (smok смок) stirrups and a curb bit (yuzda юзда) of two fierce snakes (zmii змии). She may also use a snake-whip to lash her mount. (Note: Two zmii snakes as bridle, a third as whip(СбНУ/SbNU, Vol. 53, No. 143)) (Note: An adder as whip ("Я камшик и усойница", recited by Baba Despa).)

The samodiva was believed to assume her own (humanlike) form by night, but turned into a whirlwind during the day.

In Rhodopian regions of Bulgaria and in Macedonia, the invisible samodiva can be seen by the sabotnitsi (Bulgarian/Macedonian: саботници, people born on a Saturday), or "mixed" offspring of wood nymphs, or the povtaratsi (people who after being weaned as children went back to being breastfed), and by "four-eyed" dogs (Note: Dogs with spots above their eyebrows, simulating two more sets of eyes.) (chetiri ochi четири очи), or "Saturday dogs", but this is something that is said of diabolical creatures across the board. (Note: Thus it is said of the Bulgarian vampire that they are only visible to people or dogs born on Saturdays, or to four-eyed dogs.)

The yuda is considered invisible, and noticed only as a voice (or an echo) that's heard, or as a glimpse of light, or appears as wind, in various accounts and especially in the Rhodope region, and hypostasis as whirlwind, reflects the belief that such demonic beings are the cause of whirlwinds. (Note: Whereas in other regions of Bulgaria, the whirlwind is believed to be caused by the talasum or karakondzhul.)

=== Habitat ===
According to Bulgarian folklore, the samodivi tend to dwell in springs/wells and rivers high atop mountains; their favorite home was Mount Pirin, but they are also connected with other mountains in Bulgaria such as Belasitsa, Rudina mountain, Vitosha, Rila, Rhodopes, and the Balkan Mountains. They inhabited various watery spots: riverbanks, whirlpools, pools/ponds, and lakes, caves (grottos), and gorges.

They also live hidden in the groves near lakes where they bathe. Thus Samodivi might live inside trees (e.g., beech trees, elms, oaks, walnuts, or poplars, which are called samodiva trees); but the ash and sycamore (American English: sycamore maple (Note: Georgieva's Bulgarian original gives Явор, glossed as "sycamore maple"; it is presumably not "sycampore" in the sense of "American planetree" which is native to North America.)) trees drive them away. They may also dwell within trees that have lost their crowns. (Note: Bulgarian: аловити)

During the autumn, they go to live in the mythical village of Zmejkovo (or Zmeykovo, "dragon village" Змейково) at the edge of the world; the samodivi will again enter the human world during the spring, staying until autumn. (Note: Georgieva: "The wood nymphs lived at world's end and from spring to autumn, between the day of the Annunciation and that of John the Baptist's death by beheading, they lived on earth". She specifies the nymphs' homeland to be Zmeykovo (Змейково) in the revised work.) Other than the nymphs, only magpies and eagles can reach this village. Ancient eagles (kartali картали (Note: Apparently cognate to Turkish "kartal" denoting a carrion-eating eagle. The term картали in Macedonian language is given as the common name for Vultur monarchus (Lappet-faced vulture).)) are hitched to the samodivi's chariots.

These fairies were also believed to haunt bridges, abandoned churches, water mills, fountains, and especially crossroads. While the samodivi may be associated with water mills, the water mill was also where the monsters such as the karakondjo (Note: Also little pagans (pogancheta), bugbears (boubartsi), hobogoblins (bougantsi).) would descend upon during the Unbaptized Nights.

Alternate sources say the winter home of the samodivi, at the edge of the world, is called Kushkundalevo, (Note: Bulgarian: "открай света, от село Кушкундалево, дето живеят самодивите",) a place only the magpies can find. The samodivi homeland might also be called Omayniche (Омайниче, (Note: This is the Bulgarian common name for the plant, hairy ground-ivy, Glechoma hirsuta.)) and in Ran Bosilek's version, the samodiva, though she flees, tells the shepherd to seek her out in Omayniche (cf. § Bosilek's Samovila). Kushkundalevo (Кушкундалево) is also given as the home of the samovila in Macedonian folktale, (Note: "Ovčarot i trite samovila Овчарот и трите самовила [The Shepherd and the Three Samovila]".) though the fairyland the shepherd must quest for is called Patelevo (Пателево) in some versions.

The samodivi also have their special dancing grounds called (samovito igrishte самовито игрище, lit. 'fairy playing field'), or Samodivska Igrišca, which are found in clearings. These dancing rings are on grass, i.e., the fairies fashion a circle of trampled grass, with a dark green patch of vegetation at the center for their piper. Though according to others, the plot where they dance become scorched, thus devoid of grass.

== Folklore by country ==
=== Bulgarian folklore ===
In Bulgarian folklore, Samodivas occur as the personified form of nature. They are protectors of nature and are often juxtaposed with the ways humans live their lives.

They may endow gifts to the newborn, like the Fates, or otherwise grant boon to those who treat the fairies with respect. On the other hand, they may afflict humans with suffering, illness, or death, if disrespected. Death or illness befell any human who trespassed unwelcomed upon their territory, and the fairy disease was one that only a specific "samodiva flower" can cure, namely the Dictamnus albus (dittany or burning bush;). The dittany (rosen росен) is the wood nymphs' favorite blooming plant, and they deck themselves with this flower which they pick on Ascension Day or on the Wednesday of Midsummer Week.

The samodivi, generally believed to be knowledgeable in herb lore and plants with medicinal qualities, are also associated with such flowers or herbs as dittany, dwarf everlasting (aka immortelle; smil смил), dog rose (shipka шипка), guelder rose (kŭlina кълина), and juniper.

The samodivi, according to the folklore, form pacts of sworn brotherhood with renowned heroes (yunátsi/junáci юна́ци; sing.: yunak/junák юнак ); the heroes suckling on the milk of the samodivi acquire immense strength, for example, Sekula Detentse ('the Child'), Krali Marko, and Momchil Yunak. The samodivi also cure the wounds of heroes or resurrect them using "living water" (zhiva voda жива вода) or applying medicinal herbs. In Bulgarian song, a certain Pomak (Bulgarian-speaking Muslim) is one hero cured by his "sister", a samodiva.

Another important aspect of the figure of the samodivi wood nymphs (or the samovili) is their love of music and dance. The samodivi (or samovili) also like to engage in musical contests, especially with shepherds, betting to see if the player could outlast the fairies dancing, the prize for victory being the youngest fairy's hand in marriage, or exemption from the payment of tribute. This theme has been identified as one of AT 302.3.4.2: "Fairies dance with youth until he dies or goes mad". Another example in the poem Димо кавалджия и Гюргя самовила ("Dimo the Kaval Player and Gyurgya the Samovila") relates how the flautist Dimo outplays the fairies' hora dancing and wins the youngest fairy Gyurgya as bride; she eventually tricks the husband into liberating her. (Note: Also given online by this title "Димо кавалджия и Гюргя самовила", but attributed source, Miladinov, No. 2, does not bear such a descriptive title.) (Note: Miladinov brothers (1861), p. 42, No. 2, as cited by Georgieva (1983), p. 116) (Note: In a variant, the shepherd's name was Bozhko Божко who took Gyurgaza Гюргаза, the youngest samovila, as his wife by after his flute three days out-enduring the samovili dancing (recited by Baba Valkana Penovitsa, village of Litakovo).) Such victorious shepherds are variously named Murzho Муржо, Dimitar Димитър, Boyko Бойко, etc., in folklore, with Dimitar winning a waiver of the tribute paid to the fairies as § Grazing fee. Note also that it is when Prince Marko's companion Ivé dares to sing in her forest that Vida the samodiva decides to punish the insolence by shooting him (cf. Vida under § Prominent Samodivas in folklore)

The other major way for a human to win the fairy bride is to steal her clothing or her garland (cf. § Samodiva bride).

Also when a samodiva takes love-hold of a young man, he turns pale and sickly. His mother or sister would try to counter the effects by sewing certain herbs (tansy вратига, wormwoodпелин, melilot комунига and pheasant's eye/Adonis sp. (Note: The Adonis Гороцвет collected from virgin forest; or wormwood, tansy, melilot gathered from nine virgin gardens)) into his belt or cap, but the fairy would invariably discover this and turn angry, tearing him apart.

A number of Bulgarian folktales describe a victim's run-in with a samodiva's wedding. The bride would hand out gifts as well as wine to drink, and expected to be showered with money in return. However in the morning at the crowing of the cock, the gifts turn to sticks and leaves, the wine cup turns into a tortoise shell or a horse skull, and the money into lumpls of coal. The guest finds himself perched high on a treetop (typically a willow).

Samodivi roam in the night dancing the horo (chain dance) to the accompaniment of bagpipes and drums, while shouting "ihou-ou", as traditionally done at weddings.

They are said to feed on white bread, honey, apples and mushrooms, rowan berries (Sorbus aucuparia), and drink water or mead collected from fruit blossoms. They avoid pork and lard.

As already touched upon, the Rhodopian juda is believe to assume the guise of whirlwind, and likewise the western Bulgarian samodivi. A whirlwind-vila coils around Stoyan in the Bulgarian folk song Samodivi svatba (Самодиви сватба "Samodivi's wedding". (Note: Vasil Stoin ed. (1928), No. 1429, untitled, Stoin ed. (1930) "Samodivi svatba". Quoted in Georgieva (1983), p. 117) (Note: Retitled online as Samodivi zadigat svirets (Самодиви задигат свирец "Samodivi kidnap a musician/piper").) In Rhodopian lore, certain incantations are shouted out that are supposed to ward off the juda, such as "May you drink milk from a bitch" (От кучка мляко да пиеш).

These fairies are thought to control weather involving water, thus capable of causing rain or raising a storm. (Note: Cf. the Bulgarian song about her castle: "And from there she hurled a storm /And a plague it was she hurled")

In Bulgaria, the samodivi are also blamed for illnesses, i.e., blindness (cf. § Samovila as eye-snatcher), deafness, and apoplexy. The samovili are notorious for snatching away the eyes of maidens, especially beautiful black eyes they grow jealous of.

The samodivi abduct children, as well as young men and woman so they can serve as carriers of their bows and arrows, baby-sisters, and labor for building up their airborne castles, and to thresh the everlasting flower; the threshing of the smil usually being a task assigned to the magpies in the Zmeykov ("dragon village") the wintertime home of the samodivi (cf. also § The Priestess of the Samodivas). The sacrificial humans the samodivi demand as tribute also include strong unhired youths, songstress girls, nursing infants, chain-dancing (horo-dancing) brides, kaval-flute players, etc.

One piece of terrifying folklore is that the castle which the samovila builds uses humans as building material—newlywed men as foundation stones, maidens as mortar to join the upper stones, brides for roofs, cradle infants for pillars, etc.

Also according to folk belief, girls and young women who met a premature and violent death turn into samodivi, and even young brides or unbaptized children transform into samodivi in death. (Note: It is also said that "The water nymphs were the souls of unbaptized children or of children born dead or of unmarried people who had died a premature and violent death". That a girl who died before her time became water spirit ("willy") applies to the Russian Rusalka also. This connects with the belief that the samodivi lurk in the residences where violent death victims or unbaptized children had lived.)

Balkan mythology sometimes also holds that the samodivi were the daughters of Lamia (Ламя).

=== Macedonian folklore ===
In Macedonian folklore (songs) the fairies are known as juda/yuda, vila, or samovila, and are believed to live in groups, usually of large size, and seldom found as a solitary. They dwell in their fairy village located in the woods, rivers, lakes or sea, erecting a castle high atop mountains. They have names, such as Angelina, Vela, Ǵurǵa, Erina, Stana, or Stojna. According to Macedonian tradition, it was a samovila named Jana who gave Marko Krale his immense strength (cf. Vila and Veda). Macedonian folklore also say they may inhabit trees, like oaks and willows.

They draw their demonic power from the magical clear water which they immerse in at their mountain wells, streams and lakes, where they bathe, frolic, dance and sing. The springs where they live are believed to have healing powers. Subtypes, depending on their habitat, are called planinki планинки "mountain fairy" or ezerkinji езеркињи "lake fairy", or oblakjinji облаќињи "cloud fairy".

They are characterized as females lovely to behold, with blue or greenish eyes, and long flowing hair (blonde (Note: In a Macedonian version of the Stoyan/Stojan ballad, the yuda or samovila has fair hair or blonde hair: русата коса.) or sometimes red-haired,) reaching the ground. The samovila's life force is said to reside in her hair, so she cannot afford to lose even a strand. She would sometimes give a small portion of it to her lover to strengthen her control over him via its magical effects.

According to some, the samovila only assumes a humanlike female form during the night, and transforms into the form of a storm or gale of wind, though some explain that she merely uses the storm as a vehicle to carry her, rather than to shapeshift into a tempest.

She may also have wings, or even demonical goat hooves. It is also told that they can be seen by dogs with four eyes and mixed Samovilski children.

These fairies are ever-present in the environs of humans, but they (including the yudi of the Rhodope) are not really favorably disposed to them. As in Bulgarian folk tradition, the Macedonian fairies are believed to demand humans to enter their servitude, particularly kavaldžii (кавалции, kaval flute players), svireldžii (свиралџии, music-makers), pesnopojki (песнопојки, singers), and girls to babysit and foster their children. They also set down taboos forbidding peasants from ploughing on holidays. They also engage in various competition with humans. One onerous piece of behavior is that the fairies dry up the human wells, transporting the water into the mountains, and peddle the water in jars, for the price of the purchaser's "black eyes".

Sometimes these fairies fall in love with humans and peaceably become their wives, though sometimes the union is forced upon by the human husband who entrap them into living as wives, for a period in captivity. It is also said that the samovila chooses a healthy strong man (often mountain shepherds) but these men only survive the partnership with the fairies for only 5 or 6 years. It is said they can only produce daughters by themselves, by parthenogenic birth (via "vegetative вегетативен " process), and can only give birth to son from a union with a mortal man, but a boy child is not allowed to remain in the samovila society.

Their designated dancing spot is enchanted, and takes on a recognizably blackened appearance. Their dance is referred to as the (samovilsko oro (самовилско оро, the "samovila's oro"; cf. commentary on round dance in Vila (fairy) § folkloric accounts). Hearing their voice can drive one mad, or render him incapable of tolerating human voices afterwards. They do not suffer humans to be better singers than they.

The folklore of the so-called "samovila weddings" is also widespread. A random person walking by the nuptials may be given gifts, or offered wine from a flask (bukle (Note: Macedonian: букле, diminutive of Macedonian: букал, букар 'jug'.)), and in return, expected to give money, which is an invitation to attend the wedding, which lasts all night until dawn. In some regions, there is a custom for gatherers of geranium/cranesbill (здравец) and other plants considered fairy to leave a small token of bread, piece of thread, or a coin, and if shirked, the samovili make take revenge.

There is a way to kill a Samovila, and that is by making her prick herself on thorn bushes and evaporate.

== Additional folkloric data ==
=== Prominent Samodivas in folklore ===
- Vida - Also styled Vida Bazdarzhikya (Вида Баздаржийкя). In the Bulgarian song Krali Marko and Vida Samovila, the thirsty prince finds the forest devoid of water, and learns that Vida had locked away twelve springs in a dead tree; he destructively unleashes the springs; Vida in anger vows to take the prince's eyes; in the ensuing fight, the prince overcomes the fairy with the mace, and she begs her (sworn) brother's mercy in vain, for he cuts here down with the sword. Here, Vida is depicted as riding a deer, using two serpents for bridle, and a third for a whip, as already touched upon. (Note: Marko-Krale i Vida samovila, Shapkarev ed. (1891), No. 16. The first line "Shetba sheta Marko Kralevik Шетба шета Марко кралевик [Prince Marko Roams the Woods]" has been used to refer to this ballad in lieu of title by some sources.) (Note: Given under Krali Marko i Vida samovila and also retitled Vida samovila zaklyuchila dvanadeset izvori Вида самовила заключила дванадесет извори "Vida the Vila locked up twelve springs" online.) In a song with a somewhat different plot, Vida attacks her intruders and shoots Marko's companion Ivé dead; Marko overcomes her and compels her to restore Ivé back to life (cf. § Samodiva as healer) Here, Vida's deer is named Shestokrilets Шестокрилец, "Six-Winged")
- Gyurgya (Гюргя /ɡʲo̟rɡʲɐ/)- The youngest of the samovili, rewarded to Dimo (Димо) by his flute-playing, defeating the fairies dance, as aforementioned.
- Dena (Дена) the samovila – wet nurse to Sekula Detentse
- Magda (Магда) the samovila – sworn sister of herb-gatherers, who are enabled to collect samodiva herbs for remedy or magic.
- Radka (Радка, meaning "Joy") the samovila – sworn sister of shepherds and herders.
- Smita (Смита) the samovila – sworn sister of woodcutters.
- Stana (Стана) the samovila- sworn sister of pipers, kaval flute players, and female singers. She bears the epithets of "Slender Stana" („тънка Стана") or "Golden Winged" („златнокрила")

The youngest samovila is otherwise said to be Gyurga (Гюрга /ɡʲo̟rɡɐ/), with Dimna-Yuda (Димна-юда) being the eldest. Other samovili mentioned by name include Irina (Ирина), Angelina (Ангелина), Stoina (Стоина), Germeruda (Гермеруда), and Gyura (Гюра).

=== Samodiva bride ===
This tale group has been catalogued as BFP 400 Невяста самодива "Samodiva Bride" (Note: In German: Die Samodiven-Braut) which matches up with AT 400, "the man on a quest for his lost wife" (Note: aka "Quest for the lost bride") or "The Swan Maiden". The catalogue also lists under this the subtype BFP 400* Самодива къща не гледа ("Samodiva does not mind house", cf. subsection below) (Note: In German: Samodiva besorgt das Haus nicht) (Cf. also motif index D 361.1 "Swan maiden").

It is usual for a human to win a samodiva in a bet (i.e., a contest with stakes) or by stealing her clothing (zenets, i.e., garland, etc. The stolen clothing motif in folk song usually plays out with the bride's escape. After a child is born, the husband is lulled into thinking this motherly tie will secure her to the home. But at the child's christening, she asks to have her garment back in order to properly perform the round dance, and the moment she regains her wing or zenets, she flies out the chimney.

==== The Samodiva married against her will ====
(Stoyan, married to a samodiva)

In the Bulgarian folk song translated into English as The Samodiva married against her will (no Bulgarian title (Note: The English title is literally taken from the French translation title "Samodiva mariée malgré elle". But the Bulgarian text is untitled. The Table des matière at the end of the volume therefore just gives "Пасал є Стоян телци-те" i.e., the opening line of the poem, "Stoïan led his flocks [calves] to pasture".)) the three samodivi each describe a different set of families to which she belongs (and thus not siblings), doff their magical garments to bathe but are seen by a shepherd who takes their clothing. Each girl separately tries to plead and convince the youth to return the clothing. He does so - but only to the first two; the third maiden named Marika (Note: Transcribed "Maríyka" by Stallybrass) (Мари́йка) he chose to wed after she revealed she was an only child. After the wedding, the village insists she dances for the amusement of everyone else, but the samodiva says she cannot dance without her garment. Once her husband delivers her the clothing, (Note: samodívski drékhi (Bulgarian: дрехи-те самодивски-те where drehi is "clothing") she flies away. As final insult, she dips herself in the "virgin's fountain" (or móminski fountain момински-я кладенец) and regains her virginity. A version under the title Стоян телчар и самодива ("Stoyan the calf-herd and the samodiva") also has the virgin spring ending, but the captured wood nymph is here named Radanka (Раданка). (Note: Cf. the version where Stoyan's bride is the samovila Radka (Радка), discussed by Marinov (1981), pp. 295–296, and also by Barber (2013). Although Barber uses "willy/willies" as the generic term, she clarifies on p. 17 that Radka is a samovila.) (Note: Cf. also a version lacking proper names for the human and samovila bride.)

A longer version bears the title Стоян, женен за самодива ("Stoyan, married to a samodiva").

As aforementioned, Stoyan/Stoian committing the theft of the samodivi's magical clothing to force one of them into marriage follows the pattern of the swan maiden tale-type.

==== Samodiva does not mind house ====
There is also a version collected orally in 1951 under the title Самодива къща не гледа (Note: Osinin (1963) БНТ 11: 398–401, Самодива къща не гледа Unpublished (as of Osinin 1963); from the village of Radui, Breznik region. Narrated by Ivanka Ognyanova; recorded by Elena Ognyanova in 1951.) ("Samodiva does not mind house"). (Note: Cf. A version of a Stoyan ballad excerpted by Oxenford contains these lines: "Stoïan, do not think / To take to wife as Samodiva./ She would not mind thy house, / She would not heed thee or thy children".)

Here, an unnamed shepherd first encounters three samodivi bathing and steal their shifts, demanding one of them to marry him; the fairies protest that they neither mind house nor raise children. The fairies suggest they settle the matter in contest, to see if they can outdance the man playing his kaval flute. But once they get back their shifts needed for dancing, they sprout wings and fly away. The shepherd later chances upon one of them bathing, and this time captures the bride; the deal is sealed since he manages to out-flute her dancing. She counsels him to hide her clothing but not to cast it away in water for her sisters will only retrieve it, nor bury it, since she will die; thus the shepherd keeps it in a locked chest. After years of marriage and a child born between them, a party for the godfather to christen their child is held, when the shepherd unwarily restores the shift to his samodiva wife; released from her clumsiness, she dances magnificently, but afterwards bids farewell. The shepherd will never see her again, but she will visit the child, and requests that a pogača loaf and honey to be put out on Saturdays for her.

==== Bosilek's Samovila ====
In Ran Bosilek's version (1970), the shepherd follows the advice from his grandfather to play the tune for the horo dance (on his kaval flute), and while she is engrossed in dancing, to snatch the wreathe off her head, which will rob her the power to leave, and will be forced to be his wife. The couple live happily on, until she tricks her husband into restoring her wreathe to perform her dance during a party, but even though she flees afterwards, she tell him to find her at Omayniche, which he succeeds with the help of birds.

==== The Youth and the Vila ====
In the fairy tale The Youth and the Vila, the youngest son, who is considered a fool by his two elder brothers, manages to pluck the golden hairs of a vila who has been eating the silver pears of his father's garden. He later takes her back to his father's house.

==== The Vila in the Golden Castle ====
In the Russian fairy tale The Vila in the Golden Castle, a father asks his three sons to guard his flower garden at night because swans have been eating the flowers (in reality, the vilas were). The vila returns home to the golden castle which prompts the youth to seek her. There, an old vila, the girl's mother, sets tasks for him to perform.

==== Tsar's child adopted by the bey ====
One variant of the man-stealing-wings-from-samodiva is given in summary as follows: A tsar had a problem child who caused such mischief as to shatter water jugs throwing (knuckle) bones, (Note: кокали) and the child was given up for adoption to a bey (Turkish lord or Muslim nobleman), who gave the prince the keys to all the rooms except one. The prince entered the forbidden room and found two winged maidens, sisters of the sun. He managed to steal the wings of one of them and married her. One day, she asked of her wings and flew away, but instructed him to find her, which he did, with the help of three animal helpers.

=== Samodiva as healer ===
In one Bulgarian tale, preserved in a group of folksongs (СбНУ/SbNU, No. 153, 154, 156, 157), when Prince Marko instructs his companion Ive/Ivé to sing in the forest, the samodiva Vida takes this to be an affront, and shoots Ive dead, then hides behind the moon. Marko, who was Ivé's sworn brother, seeks out and discovers Vida, and compels her to restore Ivé back to life. In the variant telling, Marko seeks out Vila, his sworn sister (No. 154), and Vila reveals the recipe of flowers needed for the elixir; Marko gathers the ingredients which are boiled in his mother's pot, and pouring on the remedy put Ive back on his feet.

=== Samovila as eye-snatcher ===
==== Mircho and samovila ====
A simple Bulgarian folk song (titled Samovilska) tells of a young man named Mircho (Мирчо) who braves the beech woods near the water spring where the samovilas had extracted his father's eyes. Playing the tambur, he engages in a contest to see who outlasts one another. By winning, he obtains from the fairies the magical water which when poured on his blind father will restore his eyesight.

==== Stana and samovila ====
Another Bulgarian folk song given in English translation tells of a girl named Stana whose two beautiful black eyes are snatched away when she goes out into the garden to pout about the scolding she got from her mother, who was warning her not to go to church early for the Easter Festival, for fear the young priest may try to make amorous advances on her. In a Macedonian variant, the girl Stana is punished thus for breaking the taboo not to embroider on Easter Day.

==== The Three Samovilas, the Old Blind Man and the Outcast ====
A more complex Macedonian tale, incorporating several motifs, is Трите самовили, стариот слепец и ќелешот ("The Three Samovilas, the Old Blind Man and the Outcast" (Note: German translation published as Die drei Feen, der blinde Alte und der Aussätzige.)), which tells of a destitute "outcast" youngster or ragamuffin (kelesh) who inveigles himself to be adopted as the son of a blind man who lives in a palatial mansion with 12 treasure vaults. The youth obtains the keys to 10 of them, gaining access to silver, gold, and such treasure. The blind man would not give him the 2 remaining keys. He instructs the youth to herd the sheep, but despite warnings about the area off limits, encounters the samovilas, who challenge him to play the flute long enough to outlast the fairies' dancing. If he loses, the fairies will take his eyes as wager. The youth tricks the fairies into interrupting the contest by boasting he is an excellent groomer of hair, and when he approaches, ties their hairs together. The youth force the fairies to restore the blind man's sight, and they relinquish two apples which they say will give the old man his sights back. The youth bargains for the two keys in return, and obtains access to the rooms with a winged horse and a winged hinny. He also turns half golden and half silver upon entering the fountains in those rooms. He steals away on the winged horse for further adventure. He gains employment under the royal gardener, and by throwing off his rags and riding through the garden in his dashing form, catches the attention of the youngest of the tsar's daughters, and she chooses him to be her husband. The tsar is disappointed, but when he develops an eye ailment, it is the rags-clad kelesh who succeeds in obtaining the vila milk which was the cure. He goes on to aid the tsar in war, though at first unrecognized because the youngster had swapped the horse given him, which got stuck in mud, with his flying horse.

Note that theme of the adoptive father refusing to give the key to the forbidden room(s) concealing winged creatures also occurs in the Bulgarian folktale of § Tsar's child adopted by the bey.

A variant is discussed under the nondescript title "The Three Samovilas" by Slavicist Jan Louis Perkowski (2003): here, a certain boy is told by an old man (a samovila in disguise) not to pasture his flock over a certain meadow, where the samovilas will destroy him and his sheep; the boy disobeys the warning and faces the samovilas; he buys some time by playing his flute, and the fairies turn this into the commonplace contest challenging the boy's flute-playing to out-endure their dance. Here too, when the boy begins to falter, he tells a story about how he persevered his father's lice-picking his hair, thus tricking them into grooming their hair, for a chance to tie the fairies up by the hair and gain an upper hand. He then bargains for access to the sacred pasture in exchange of their release. But the fairies have already blinded the boy's father, and tells him he would have to seek out golden apples which when fitted into his father's sockets will restore his sight.

=== Abductions and deaths ===
==== Stoyan and the Three Samodivi ====
Another folk song, Stoyan and the Three Samodivi (Стоян и три самодиви) tells the story of a man named Stoyan sent on a chore by his sister, who for the sake of her infant child asks him to go fill a jar of water in the forest at night. He is warned by three Samodivi, who are his aunts, (Note: One samodiva was his paternal aunt (леля), the second was his father's sister-in-law (стрина) and the third a maternal aunt[?] (учиная).) to abandon the task of poaching the holy water and turn back quickly across the threshold, before the rooster crows; too late, he falls dead.

==== The Priestess of the Samodivas ====
In "The Priestess of the Samodivas", (Note: From the French-translated title. The Bulgarian text is untitled.) three Samodivas choose a young girl named Marika, an only child; to be taken away, apparently to serve them. They tell her to get up, promising that as the priestess of the samodivas she will live a life without weaving or spinning, but full of dance and fiddles, and daily feast. But the moment the girl rushes home to report this to her mother, the girl's soul departs (she dies).

Of similar plot is the Macedonian song "Neda abducted by 3,000 yudi and 3,000 samovili". (Note: From the French-translated title: "Néda enlevée par 3000 Youdas et 3000 Samovilas") The girl Neda is invited by these fairies to go with them, and she gives reply to wait until she has gone back to her mother to celebrated Easter, which she did. Then while at the horo dance, thunder roared, the yudi winds were raised, and the moment she spoke out to her mother for help, the yudi snatched her away. (Note: Cf. Robovski (1994), pp. 240–241: "Neda was strolling on the hill / There was lightning, there was thunder / The wind of the fairies blew / The fairies snatched her / And carried her off to the mountain top", quoted in translation from Firfov ed. (1959) Makedonski muzički folklor)

=== Grazing fee ===
As aforementioned, Dimitar the shepherd victorious in the trope music contest obtains a waiver of the payment of grazing fee to the fairies.

The strife between shepherds and the fairies (samovili, yudi) is a standard theme sung in many songs across the central Rodopi region. In one such song, the shepherds have been neglectful in offering sacrificial sheep to the yudi for the right to pasture their flock, and the infuriated yudi come to collect. The shepherds belatedly offer their black rams (вакли овни) and "white money (silver groschen, бели гроши)", but they want only the shepherd Stoyan, and proceed to suck his blood dry. (Note: Collected ballad (SbNU/СбНУ, кн. 60, № 33, ч. 1, стр. 71-72), partly quoted and analyzed by Terajima (2004), p. 10.)

Cf. also § The Three Samovilas, the Old Blind Man and the Outcast where the intrusion into the pasture guarded by the fairies forces the shepherd to pay a fee of sorts (i.e., he would have had to forfeit his eyes, though only if he lost the flute-playing game).

=== Comparative analysis ===
A huntress divinity who hunts with bow and arrow, and association with deer lends comparison of the samodiva with Greek goddess Artemis.

The folk belief in Western Bulgaria that the wood nymphs appeared in the guise of whirlwinds is similar to explanation from ancient Greek mythology that whirlwinds were Nereids playing in the air. Also in later Bulgarian folklore, wood nymphs were assigned the role of guardians of the village and home, similar to cotemporary Greek folklore that regards the Nereids as guardians of treasures and protectors of homes.

The idea of a musician competing with a supernatural is paralleled by the Ancient Greek myth of the singer Thamyris of Thrace.

The folklore of the samodivi locking up the twelve water springs in a tree root parallels the Scandinavian mythology of the Norns (Fates) and the World Tree. The similarity of the samodivi to the Fates as gift-givers were already noted.

Earliest written evidence of Samodivas dates back to the 13th century, where they presumably developed from Balkan traditions and myths. Researchers have also found influences from other Slavic folklore. It is widely believed that the image of the Samodiva and their behavior is actually based on ancient Thracian legends, especially those connected to the Cult of Orpheus, which included songs and dances performed by fire-priestesses.

== In modern fiction ==
Bulgarian poet Hristo Botev composed the ballad Hadzhi Dimitar (1873) on the revolutionary Voivoda Hadzhi Dimitar who fell in 1868; it describes the appearance of "samodivas attired in white garments" (Note: "et les samodivi, dans les blanches parures" in French translation.) "(И самодиви в бяла премена"), softly singing beside him and ministering the wounds of the dying man till dawn. (Note: In French, continues from previous line quoted as: "Entourent de chansons leur étrange beauté/Marchent sur l'herbe verte et d'une douce allure /Viennent près du héros s'asseoir à ses côtés/ L'une panse ses plaies d'une herbe de magie, /L'autre vient l'humecter de son eau")

Macedonian Georgi Pulevski composed the long poem Samovila makedonska (1878) which laments on the failure of the Kresna uprising.

Bulgarian novelist Elin Pelin has authored such short stories as "Samodiva" (1904) and "The Samodivas' Rocks".

== Eponymy ==
Thhere are landmarks in Bulgaria that have the word "samodiva" or "samovila" in them. An example of that are the Samodivski Lakes in the Pirin Mountain.
