= Dame Blanche =

Dame Blanche or La Dame Blanche (French for "White Lady") may refer to:

- Dame blanche (dessert), comprising ice cream, whipped cream, and molten chocolate
- Dame Blanche (resistance), an underground network in German-occupied Belgium during World War I
- Dames blanches, female spirits or supernatural beings in French folklore and mythology
- La dame blanche, an opera by François-Adrien Boieldieu
- La Dame Blanche, stage name of Yaité Ramos Rodriguez (born 1974), Cuban musician
- "La Dame Blanche" (Outlander), a 2016 episode of the television series Outlander

== Wine grape varieties ==
- Dame Blanche, a synonym for Doña Blanca, grown primarily in Spain and Portugal
- Dame blanche, a synonym for Folle blanche, grown predominantly in Central France
- Dame blanche, a synonym for Jurançon, grown predominantly in Southwest France

== See also ==
- Lady in White (disambiguation)
- White Woman (disambiguation)
- White Lady (disambiguation)
