= White Woman (disambiguation) =

White Woman is a 1933 film by Stuart Walker.

White Woman or White Women may also refer to:

- White women, demographic term
- White Women (album), a 2014 album by Chromeo
- White Women, a 1997 album by William Carlos Williams
- "White Women", a 1976 song by Sparks from Big Beat
- "White Women", a 1984 song by Jonas Hellborg from Elegant Punk
- "White Women", a 2006 song by Adam Green from Jacket Full of Danger
- "White Women", a 2012 song by Caustic from I Can't Believe We're Re-Releasing This Crap
- White Women, a 1976 book by Helmut Newton

== See also ==
- Iztaccihuatl, a Mexican mountain whose name translates to "white woman"
- Dames blanches ("White Ladies"), spirits in French mythology or folklore
- Weiße Frauen ("White Women"), spirits in German folklore
- White woman of Gippsland, a supposed European woman held captive by Aboriginal Australians in the 1840s
- Lady in White (disambiguation)
- White Lady (disambiguation)
- The Woman in White (disambiguation)
- Dame Blanche (disambiguation)
- White people (disambiguation)
- White Lady, a female ghost
