= White guy =

White guy may refer to:

- "The White Guy", a song on the 2006 album What Hell Is About
- "The White Guy", a 1998 episode of Damon
- Bruce Williams of Williams and Ree, an American comedy duo often billed as "The Indian and the White Guy"
- That White Guy, a James Belushi sketch on Saturday Night Live in 1984–5

== See also ==
- White Boys (disambiguation)
- White Man (disambiguation)
- White people
- Angry white male, U.S. political pejorative for a white male holding conservative or reactionary views
- Sooo Many White Guys, podcast by American comedian Phoebe Robinson
- "Pretty Fly (For a White Guy)", 1998 song by American band The Offspring
