= Dama bianca =

Dama bianca (Italian for "white lady" or "lady in white") may refer to:

- A white rock projecting into the sea at the Italian town of Duino and resembling the form of a veiled woman
- La Dama Bianca, the Italian name of the 1938 Italian comedy film The Lady in White
- The nickname the media gave to Giulia Occhini, lover of champion Italian cyclist Fausto Coppi
  - A brand name given to Italian bicycle manufacturer Bianchi's range of women's-specific bicycles, named for Occhini
- A nickname for certain models of the Maserati 3500 GT

== See also ==
- The Woman in White (disambiguation)
