= White Lady (disambiguation) =

A White Lady is a type of female ghost, typically dressed in a white dress or similar garment.

White Lady may also refer to:

== Arts and entertainment ==
- White Lady (album), by Badger, 1974
- White Lady (1987 film), a 1987 British television film by David Rudkin in the anthology series ScreenPlay
- White Lady (film), a 2006 Philippines film

== Fictional characters ==
- White Lady of Gont or Tenar, a fictional character in Ursula K. Le Guin's Earthsea novels
- White Lady of Rohan or Éowyn, a fictional character created by J. R. R. Tolkien
- The White Lady, a character from the video game Hollow Knight

== Species ==
- White lady (butterfly) or Graphium morania, a species of butterfly found in southern Africa
- White lady (plant) or Kalanchoe tetraphylla, a species of plant found in southern Africa
- White lady (spider) or Leucorchestris arenicola, a species of spider found in Namibia

== Other uses ==
- White lady (cocktail), a sour type of drink
- White Ladye, an 1891 steam yacht
- The White Lady (Ireland), a standing stone
- The White Lady (Namibia), a rock painting in Namibia

== See also ==
- Dame Blanche (disambiguation)
- Lady in White (disambiguation)
- White Witch (disambiguation)
- White Woman (disambiguation)
- The Woman in White (disambiguation)
- Order of the White Lady (France)
