= The Woman in White =

The Woman in White may refer to:

== Arts and entertainment ==
- The Woman in White (novel), by Wilkie Collins, 1859
  - The Woman in White (1912 film), an American short silent film based on the novel
  - The Woman in White (1917 film), an American silent film based on the novel
  - Tangled Lives (1917), American silent film based on novel
  - The Woman in White (1921 film), an Austrian silent film based on the novel
  - The Woman in White (1929 film), a British silent film based on the novel
  - The Woman in White (1948 film), an American film based on the novel
  - The Woman in White (musical), by Andrew Lloyd Webber, 2004, based on the novel
  - The Woman in White (1966 TV series), a British series based on the novel
  - The Woman in White (1971 TV series), a West German series based on the novel
  - The Woman in White (1982 TV series), a British series based on the novel
  - The Woman in White (1997 TV series), a British series based on the novel
  - The Woman in White (2018 TV series), a British series based on the novel
- Woman in White, a late-1930s radio series by Irna Phillips
- Woman in White (film), a 1949 Swedish film
- A Woman in White, a 1965 French-Italian film
- The Woman in White, a 2005 play by Constance Cox
- "The Woman in White", an episode of Bones (season 9)

== Other uses ==
- Giulia Occhini (1922–1993), known as La Dama Bianca ('The White Lady'), a woman in a scandalous extramarital affair of the 1950s
- La Llorona, or the Woman in White, a figure in Mexican folklore

== See also ==
- Lady in White (disambiguation)
- White Lady (disambiguation)
- White Women (disambiguation)
- Dama bianca (disambiguation)
