= Marie Jeanette de Lange =

Painter and women's dress campaigner

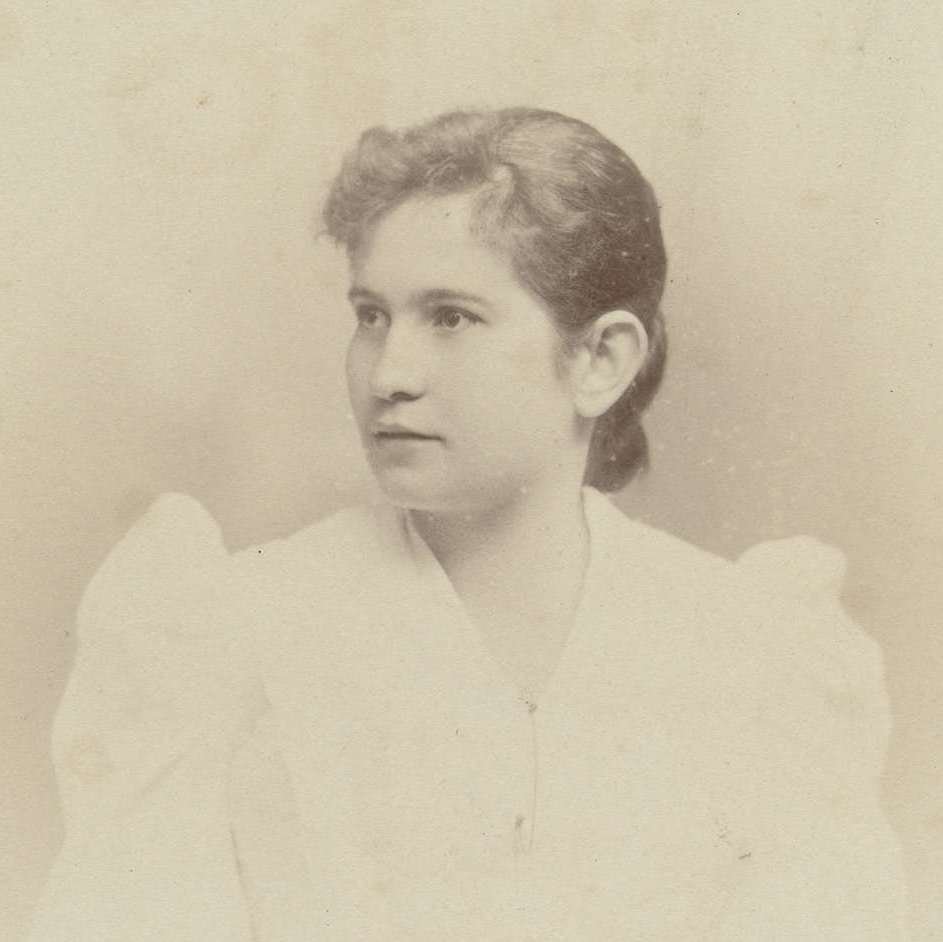
- Born: 20 December 1865; Batavia, Dutch East Indies
- Died: 7 July 1923 (aged 57); Wapenveld, Netherlands
- Known for: Women's dress reform
- Spouses: Jan Cornelis Bouman; Hendrik Jan de Lange

Marie Jeanette de Lange (20 December 1865 – 7 July 1923) was a Dutch amateur painter and reform dress advocate.

== Life ==
de Lange was born in Batavia in the Dutch East Indies in 1865. Her father was an engineer working for a mapping company. She married Jan Cornelius van Boumann in 1884 and, at age 22, they moved to The Hague where her husband took work in the Dutch Finance department. She became involved in Dutch artistic community and met photographer George Hendrik Breitner and painter Isaac Israëls among others.

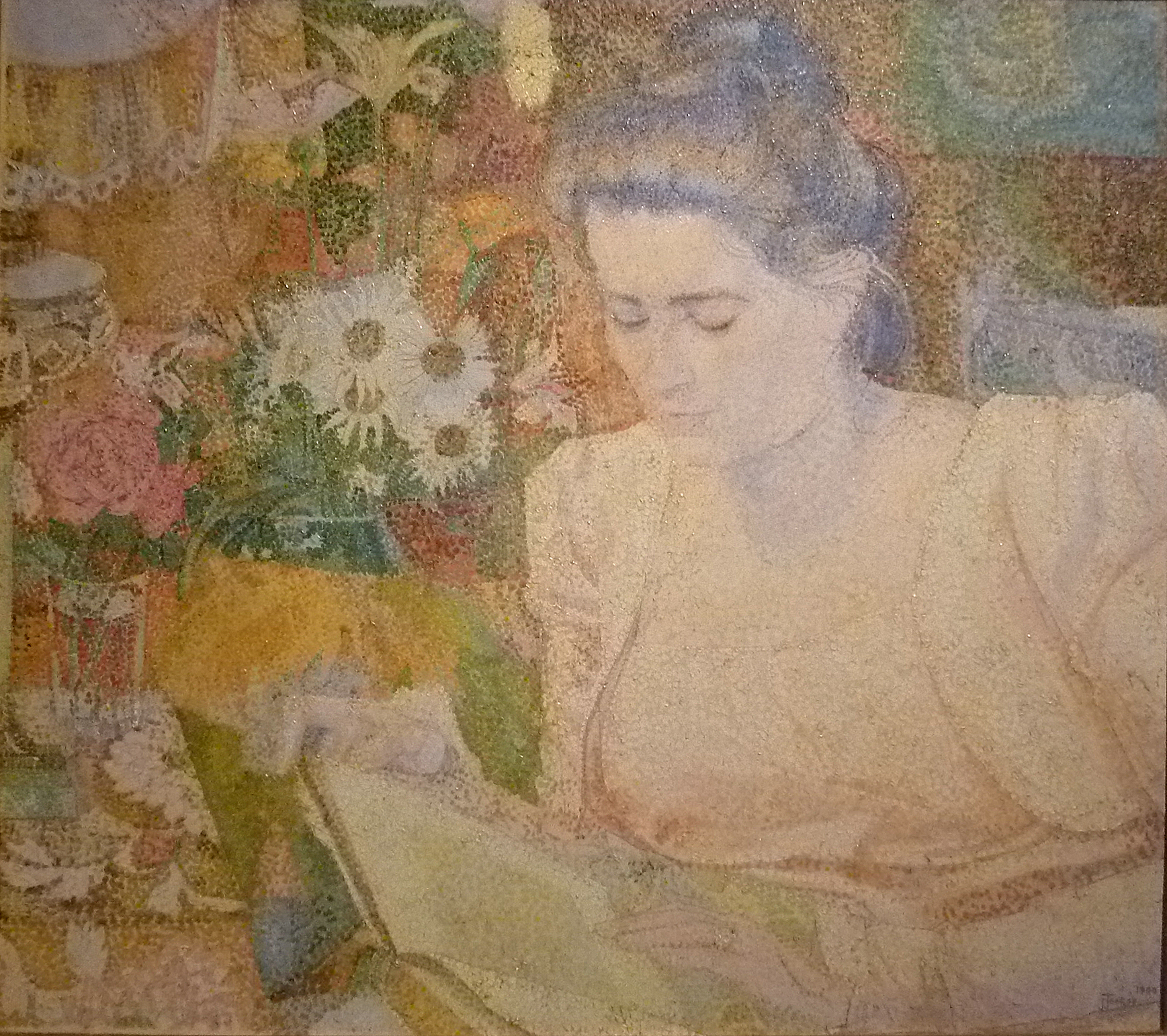
Portrait of Marie Jeannette de Lange - Jan Toorop (1900), Rijksmuseum collection.

in 1898 de Lange helped organise an exhibition of women's labour in The Hague, for which Jan Toorop designed the poster and catalogue. In 1899, as an outcome of the exhibition, de Lange founded and hosted the meetings of the Vereeniging voor Verbetering van Vrouwenkleeding (aka "V.v.V.v.V", the Association for the improvement of women's clothing).

In 1900 her portrait was painted by her friend Toorop in the pointillist style. Also born in Indonesia, it is speculated that they met at the 1898 exhibition. In 1902 there was a split between those who wanted to concentrate on the working woman and those who thought that reform was mainly required for those who spent some funds on fashionable but restrictive clothing. The latter group was centred at The Hague and de Lange was their chairperson. de Lange's approach could be seen as a more sensible continuation of fashion and she created a magazine to advocate for their views.

Lange died in Wapenveld in 1923.
