= White Boy =

White Boy, White Boys or Whiteboys may refer to:

== Film ==
- White Boy (film), a 2017 documentary about convicted teenage "drug lord" Richard Wershe Jr.
- The White Boys (film), a 1916 British silent drama film
- Whiteboyz, a 1999 film by Marc Levin

== Music ==
- White Boy (album), an unreleased 1986 album from Dan Hartman
- White Boy (EP), a 2009 EP by Australian band Magic Dirt
- Whiteboys (soundtrack), the soundtrack to the 1999 film Whiteboyz
- "White Boy", a song by Jensen McRae from the 2021 EP Who Hurt You?
- "White Boy", a song by Bikini Kill from the 1993 album Yeah Yeah Yeah Yeah
- "White Boy", a song by The Luchagors from the 2007 album The Luchagors
- "White Boy", a song by Theory of a Deadman from the 2020 album Say Nothing
- "Whiteboy", a song by James from the 2008 album Hey Ma
- "Whiteboy", a song by Tom MacDonald (rapper) from the 2018 album Deathreats
- "White Boi", a song by Dillon Francis from the 2018 album Wut Wut
- "White Boys", a song from the musical Hair

== Other uses ==
- Whiteboys, an 18th-century secret Irish agrarian organization
- The White Boys (mummers), a mummers' tradition in the Isle of Man
- A white boy, a male white person

== See also ==
- White Man (disambiguation)
