= Edgar Fernhout =

Dutch painter (1912–1974)

- Fernhout and other Dutch painters (film, 1947)
- Born: Edgar Richard Johannes Fernhout; 17 August 1912; Bergen, Netherlands
- Died: 4 November 1974 (aged 62); Bergen, Netherlands
- Style: Magical realism
- Movement: Realism
- Spouses: Rachel Pellekaan (1934–1947); Netje Salomonson (1949)
- Children: Rik Fernhout
- Relatives: Jan Toorop (grandfather)

Edgar Richard Johannes Fernhout (August 17, 1912 – 4 November 1974) was a Dutch painter.

== Life ==
Edgar Fernhout, also known as Eddy, was born in Bergen, North Holland. He was the son of artist Annie Caroline Pontifex "Charley" Toorop and philosopher Henk Fernhout. Like his mother and grandfather, Jan Toorop, he worked mainly as a painter. He married Rachel Louise Pellekaan, draftsman; no children were born from this marriage. After divorce in 1949, he married Nannette Salomonson,; from this marriage one son was born.

Fernhout's youth was far from harmonious. His parents had a bad marriage, and constant financial problems meant that the family could not afford a permanent residence. After his parents' marriage finally stranded, in 1917, the financial situation improved somewhat. Around this time, at the age of six, Edgar dedicated himself to painting under his mother's guidance.

His grandfather, Jan Toorop, took care of his granddaughter while financially supporting his daughter Charley Toorop and her two sons – Edgar and his brother John, who was a year younger. For them, he had the studio house 'De Vlerken' built in the North Holland town of Bergen, where they could retire in 1922.

In 1937, the Hague Gallery Nieuwenhuizen Segaar organized a special exhibition around the three generations of artists of the Toorop family. Edgar's son, Rik Fernhout, is also a painter, continuing the family tradition into the fourth generation.

Edgar taught alternative art education at 'Ateliers' 63' in Haarlem; among his students were Jan Dibbets, Wessel Couzijn, Carel Visser, Constant and Armando.

== Work ==
Edgar Fernhout painted in his early period especially still life and portraits. His style was initially under the influence of his mother and he began to work more precisely in small sizes.

In his first work – mainly still life and self-portraits – one clearly recognizes Charley's influence. Charley's restless and irregular lifestyle did not benefit her son's secondary school education. In 1928, Fernhout interrupted his studies, and spent the last year of high school in Paris with his mother. Through her relationship with the historian and anarchist Arthur Lehning Charley met representatives of the international avant-garde, such as Jean Arp, Alexander Calder and Max Ernst; and with Piet Mondriaan she renewed her relationship. Him as person and his work, impressed Fernhout and Mondriaan's influence on his later paintings are hard to miss.

In summer 1932, Fernhout returned to Amsterdam, where he established himself as a painter. At the age of twenty, he had his first solo exhibition, which was successful. He met in September 1932 the seven-year-older Rachel Pellekaan, whom he started dating and eventually married in 1934. Fernhout's relationship with his jealous mother became extremely complicated. Nevertheless, Charley continued to support the couple until 1940, so Fernhout could work quite carefree.

From September 1936, the Fernhouts lived in Alassio on the Italian Riviera. The reason for this stay was twofold: Rachel's weak health required a warm climate, and Fernhout wanted to study Renaissance painting. In addition this stay in the south allowed them to flee from his dominant mother. As from 1936, he received more and more portrait assignments increased, so he was able to provide for himself and his wife. During this period, Fernhout's work became more sophisticated, and initially tended to magic realism, but by the influence of his mother he later returned to precise realism.

The threat of the Second World War convinced Fernhout and his wife to return to Bergen. There the tensions increased, and the good marriage between Fernhout and his wife ended at the end of 1940. From the summer of that first war year, Fernhout lived alone – at various addresses, most of the time, however, with acquaintances in Baarn. Fernhout fell into depression during this period, which not only coincided with his broken marriage and the German occupation, but also with doubts about his artistry. While portraits made it possible for him to continue making a living during the years of war, according to his mother's advice he continued to work on polder landscapes. The sea, the beach and the dunes got a lot of influence on his work, and after 1950 abstracted paintings of beach still life with flushed objects appeared in soft, almost colorless shades. The famous French painter of the Ecole de Paris, Jean Bazaine had a lot of influence on the painting of Fernhout. Bazaine visited Zeeland from 1956 to 1959 annually for the light and space on the seaside, he learned intensively. Despite the far-reaching abstraction in his work, his titles still refer to landscape and nature.

== Work in public collections (selection) ==
- Central Museum, Utrecht
- Dordrecht Museum
- Museum Boijmans Van Beuningen, Rotterdam
- Museum of Modern Art Arnhem
- Stedelijk Museum, Amsterdam

== Exhibitions (selection) ==
- Stedelijk Museum, Amsterdam
- 2009 Museum of Modern Art, Arnhem
