= Jan Toorop =

Dutch painter (1858–1928)

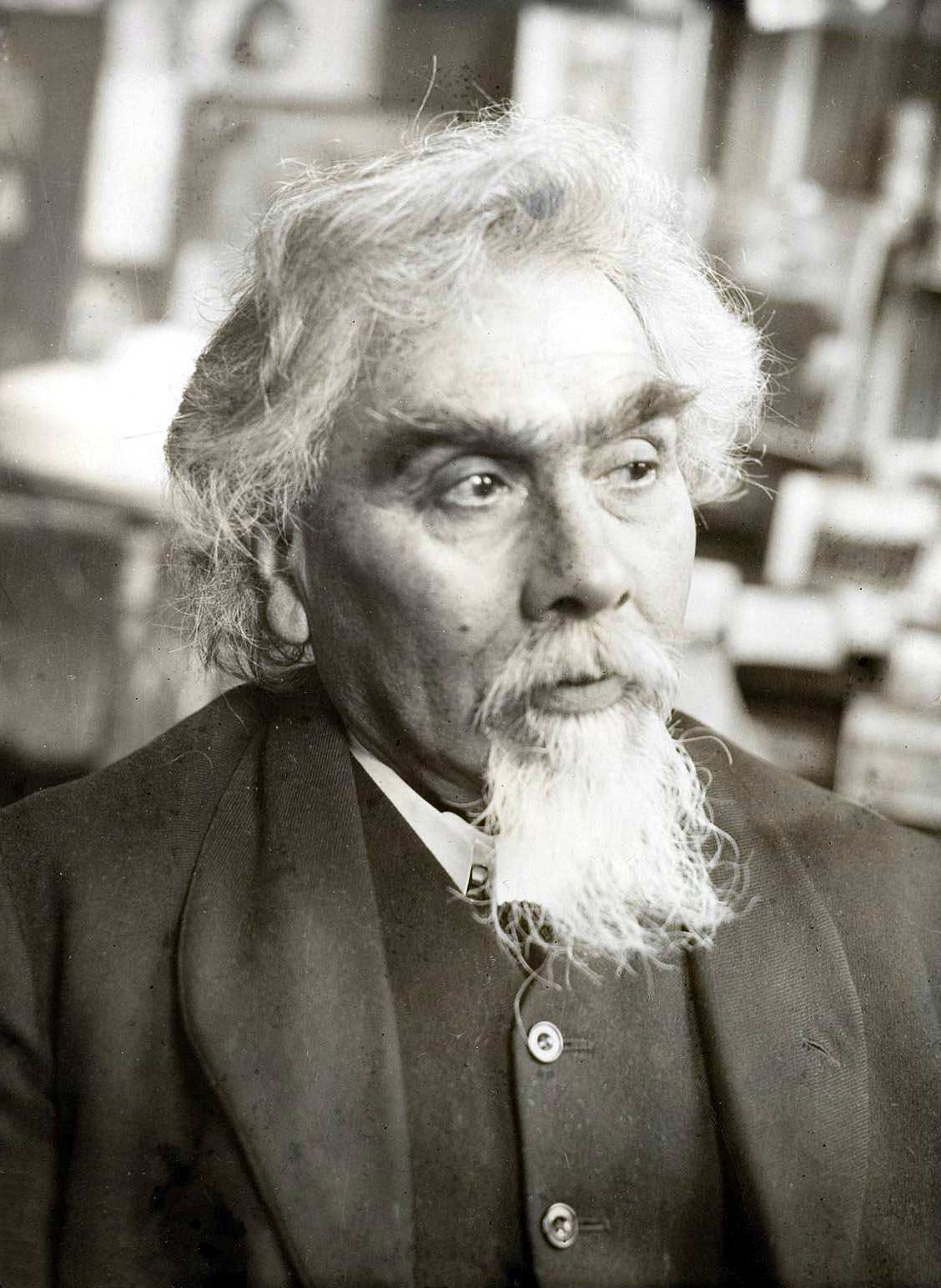
- Toorop circa 1920–1923
- Born: Johannes Theodorus Toorop; 20 December 1858; Poerworedjo, Dutch East Indies
- Died: 3 March 1928 (aged 69); The Hague, Netherlands
- Education: Rijksakademie
- Known for: Painting
- Movement: Les XX

Signature
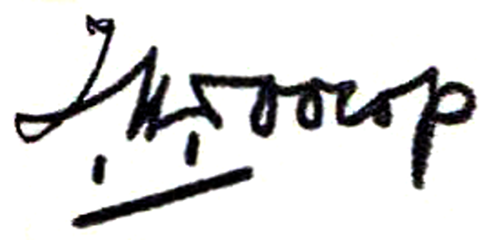

Johannes Theodorus "Jan" Toorop (Note: The phrase Johannes Theodorus Toorop is pronounced [joːˈɦɑnəs teːjoːˈdoːrʏs ˈtoːrɔp]. The phrase Jan Toorop is pronounced [jɑn ˈtoːrɔp].) (20 December 1858 – 3 March 1928) was a Dutch painter who worked in various styles, including Symbolism, Art Nouveau, and Pointillism. His early work was influenced by the Amsterdam Impressionism movement.

== Biography ==
Johannes Theodorus Toorop was born on 20 December 1858 in Purworejo on the island of Java in the Dutch East Indies (present-day Indonesia). His father was Christoffel Theodorus Toorop, a civil servant, and his mother was Maria Magdalena Cooke. He was the third of five children and lived on the island of Bangka near Sumatra until he was nine years old. He was then sent to school in Batavia on Java.

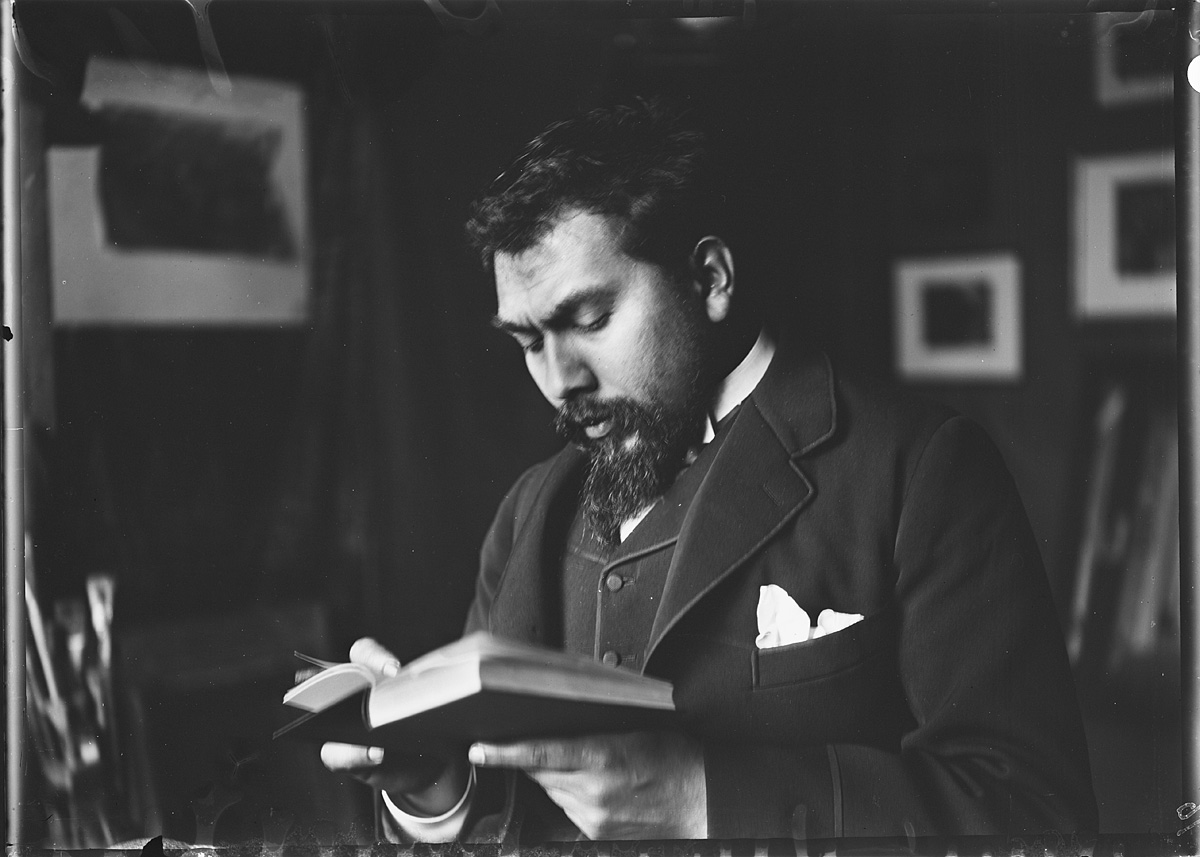
Jan Toorop in Amsterdam in 1892

In 1869 he left Indonesia for the Netherlands, where he studied in Delft and Amsterdam. In 1880 he became a student at the Rijksakademie in Amsterdam. He met the Belgian painter William Degouve de Nuncques in 1883, and the two shared a studio for a time and developed a strong friendship. From 1882 to 1886 he lived in Brussels where he joined the artist association L'Essor, which had as its original aim to rebel against the conservative tendencies of the art institutions and circles in Brussels. Later he joined in Brussels Les XX (Les Vingts, "The Twenty"), a group of artists centred on James Ensor. Toorop worked in various styles during these years, such as Realism, Impressionism, Neo-Impressionism, and Post-Impressionism.

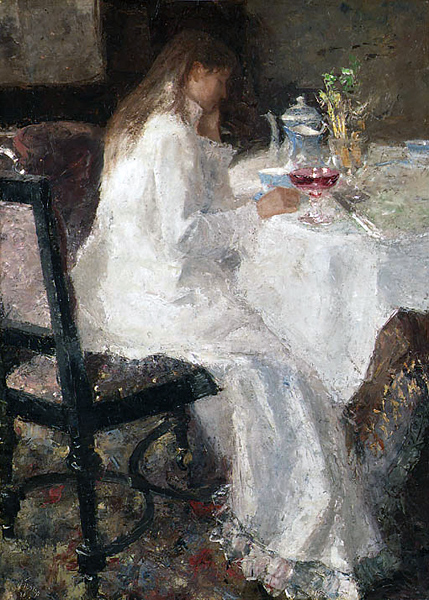
Toorop's Lady in White (1886) of his wife Annie Hall

After his marriage to Annie Hall, a British woman, in 1886, Toorop alternated his time between The Hague, England and Brussels, and after 1890 also the Dutch seaside town of Katwijk aan Zee. During this period he developed his unique Symbolist style, with dynamic, unpredictable lines based on Javanese motifs, highly stylised willowy figures, and curvilinear designs.

In the late 19th century (in 1897), Toorop lived for 20 years in a small house on the market in the seaside town of Domburg on Walcheren, Zeeland. He worked with a group of fellow artists, including Marinus Zwart and Piet Mondrian. There was no joint endeavour or common style among them. Each followed his individual personality, but they sought their inspiration in "the Zeeland Light", the dunes, forests, beaches, and the characteristic Zeeland population. Toorop was the centre of this group.

His 1900 novel portrait of his friend Marie Jeanette de Lange was made whilst she was not wearing fashionable (restrictive) clothing and it was in the style of Pointillism.

Thereafter he turned to Art Nouveau styles, in which a similar play of lines is used for decorative purposes, without any apparent symbolic meaning. In 1905, he converted to Catholicism and began producing religious works. He also created book illustrations, posters, and stained glass designs.

Throughout his life Toorop also produced portraits, in sketch format and as paintings, which range in style from highly realistic to impressionistic.

Toorop died on 3 March 1928 in The Hague. His daughter Charley Toorop (1891–1955) was also a painter, as was his grandson Edgar Fernhout.

== Public collections ==
Among the public collections holding works by Jan Toorop are:

- Museum de Fundatie, Zwolle, Netherlands
- Kröller-Müller Museum

== Works ==
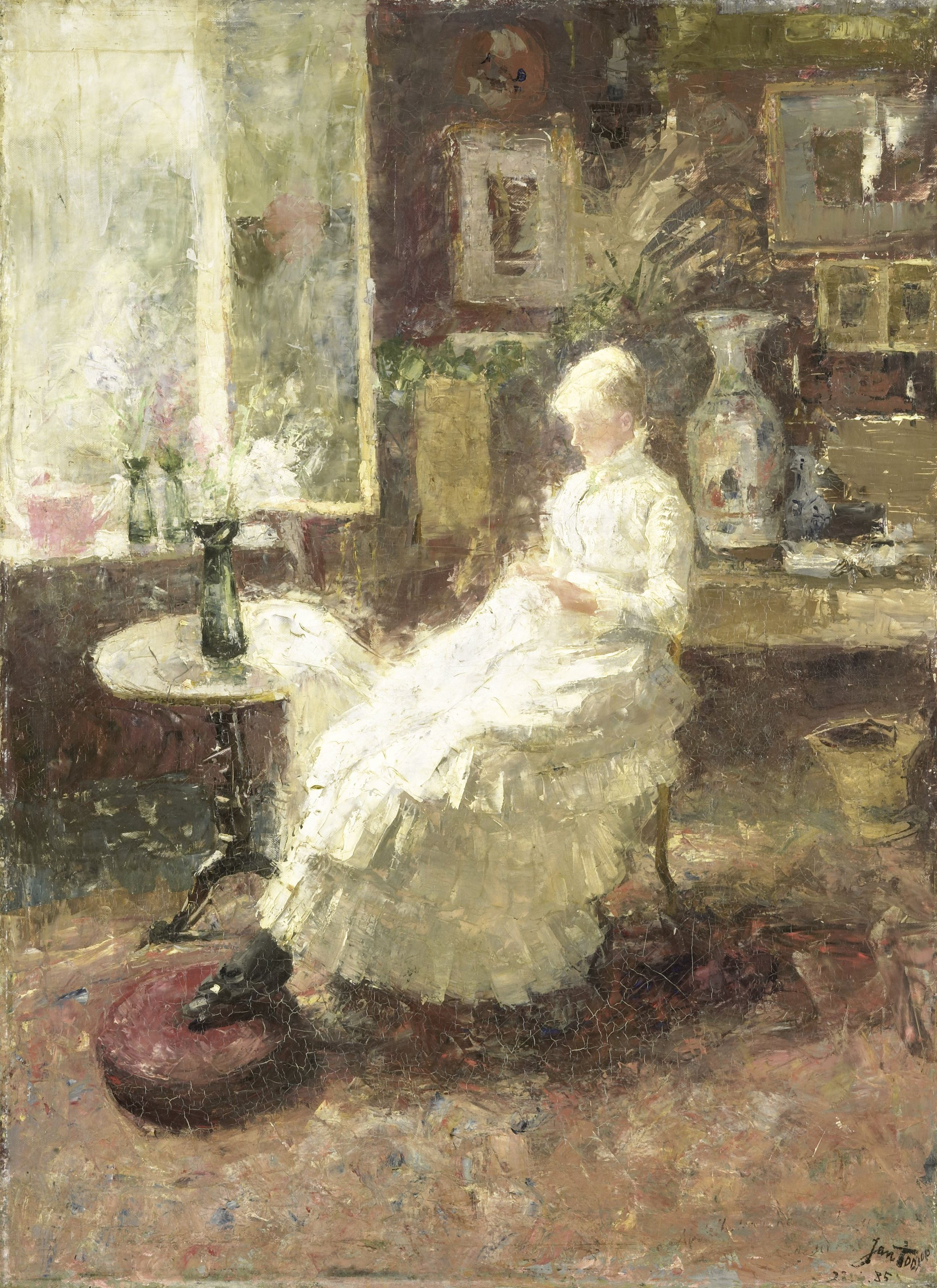
Portrait of Annie Toorop-Hall (1885)

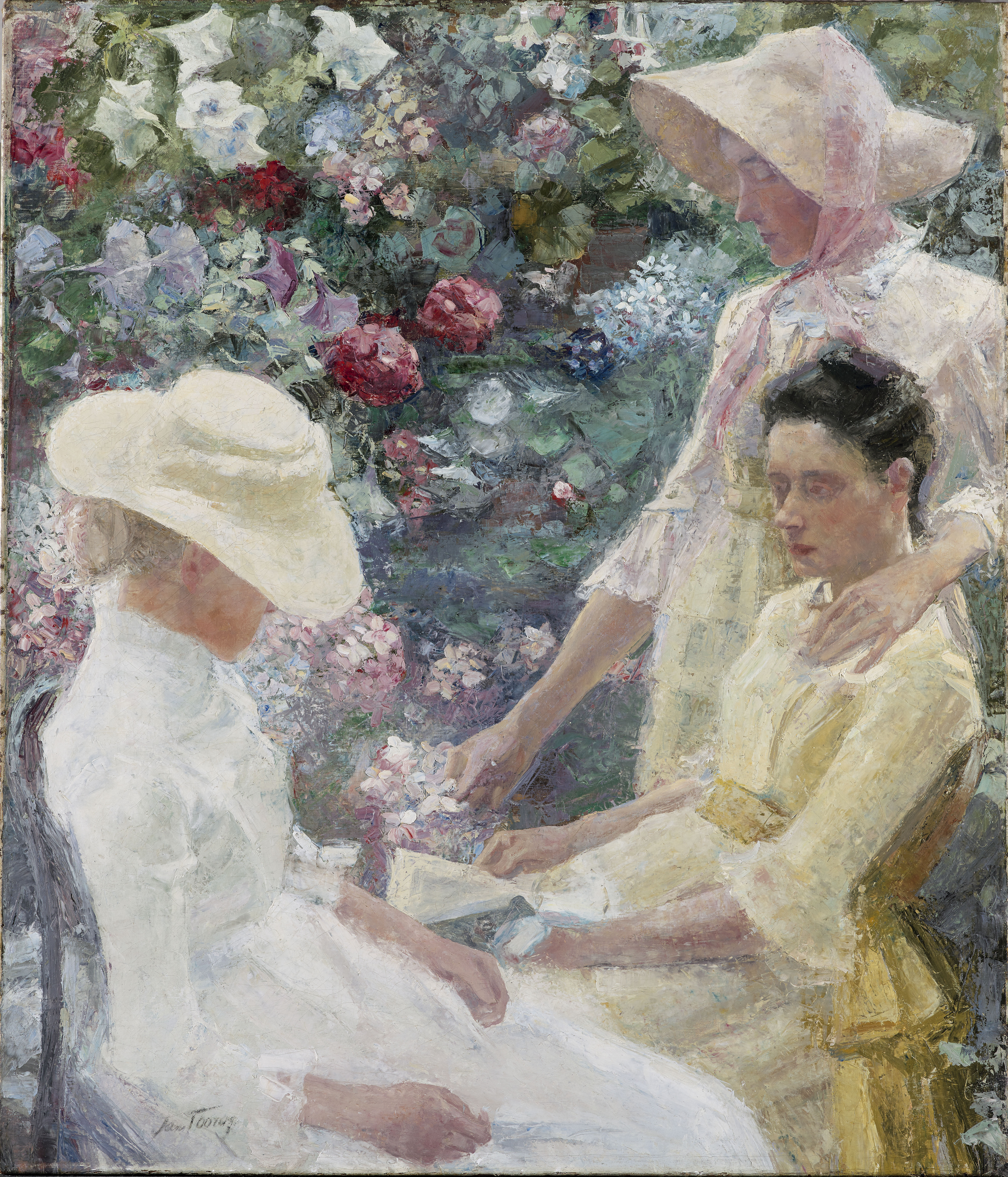
Trio fleuri (1886)

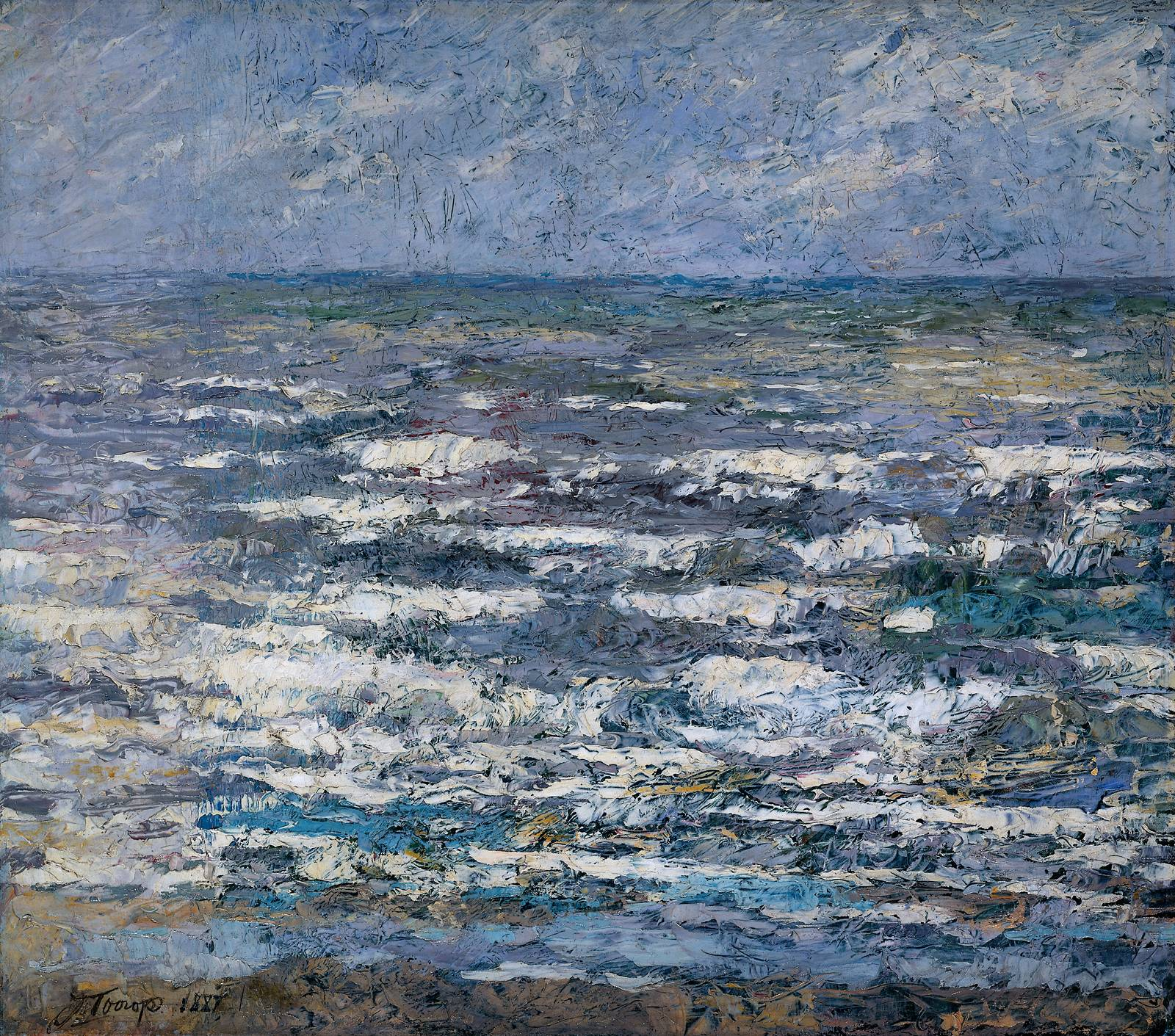
The Sea (1887)

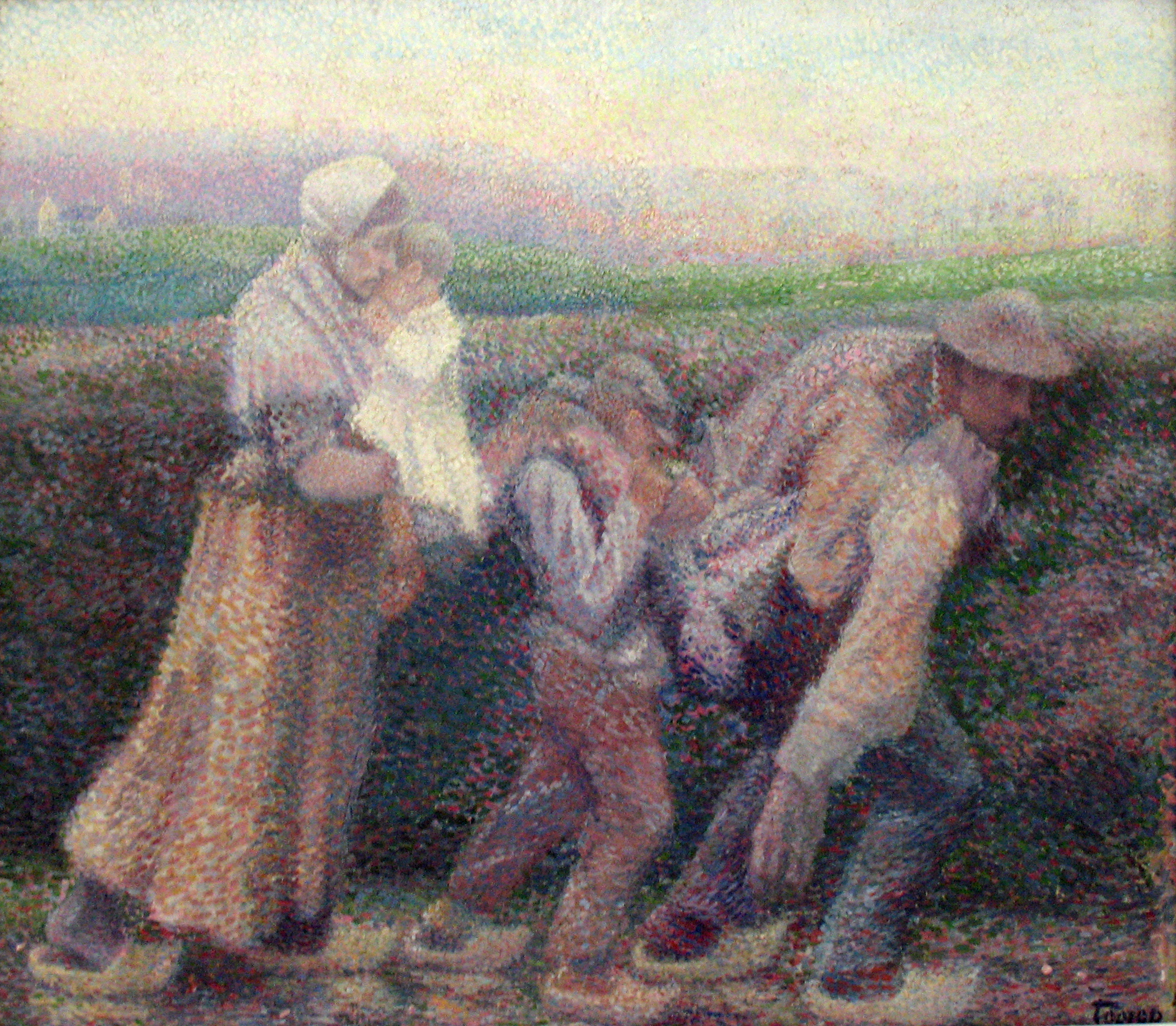
After the Strike (c. 1888–1890)

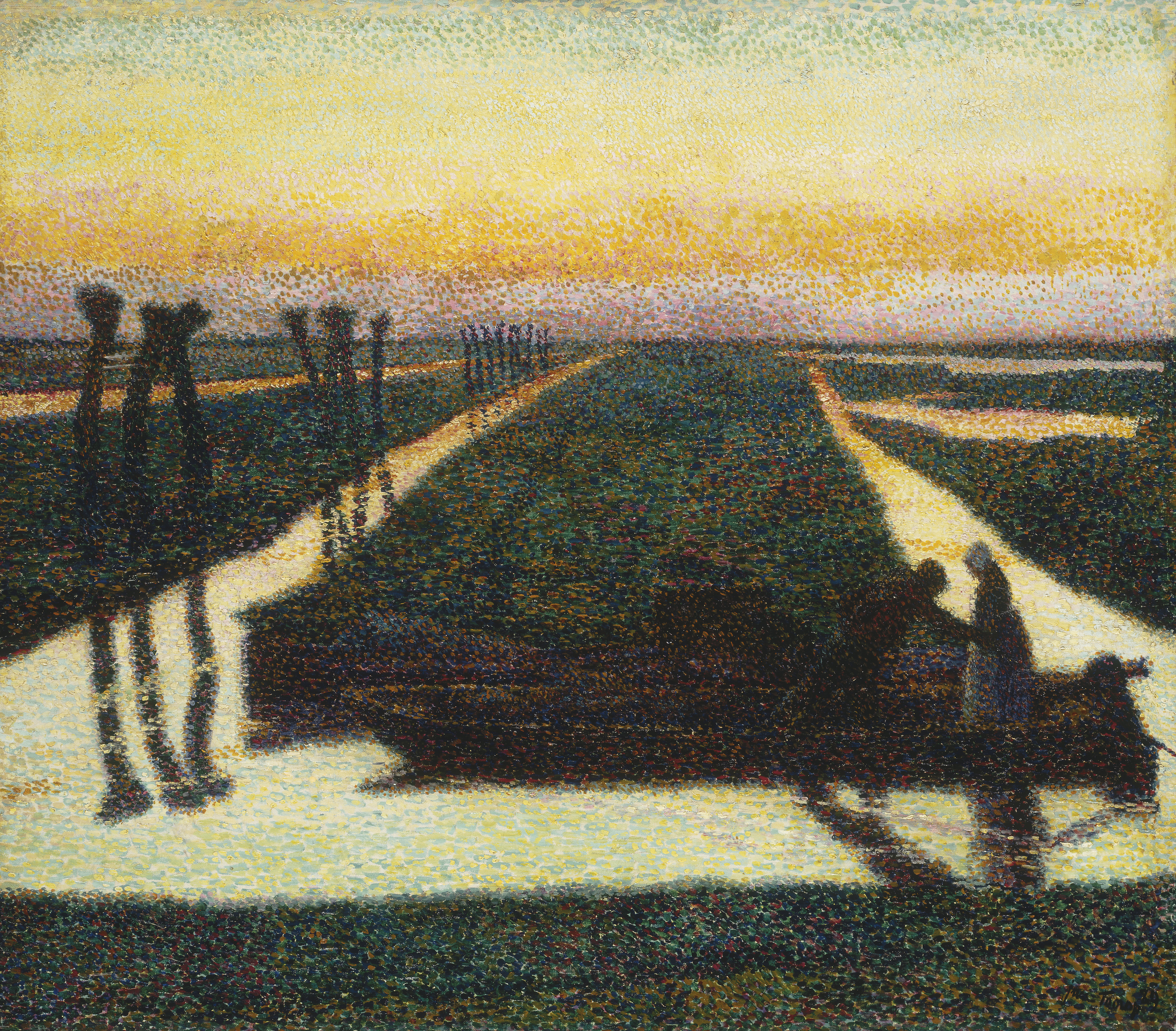
Broek in Waterland (1889)

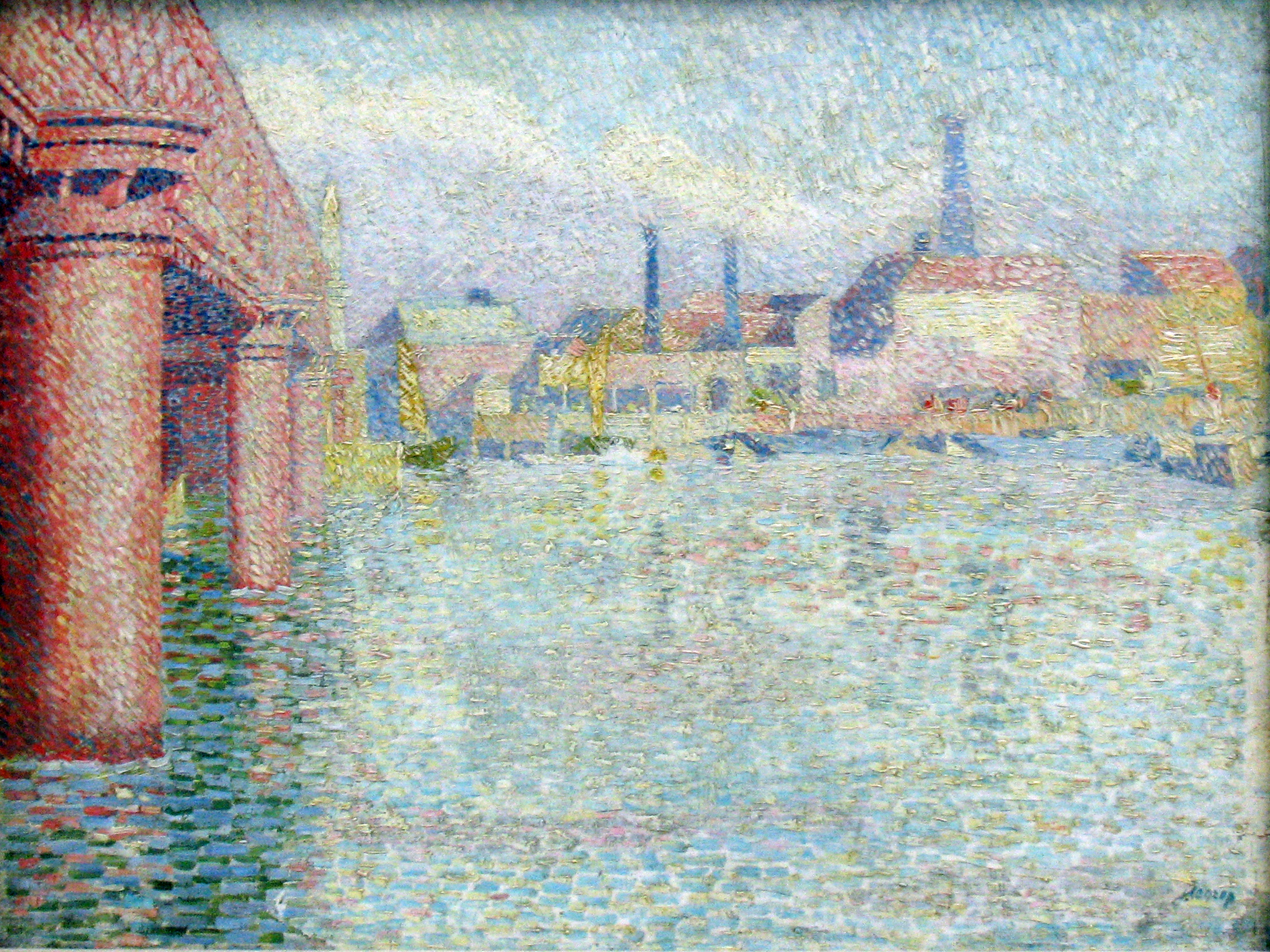
Bridge in London (1889)

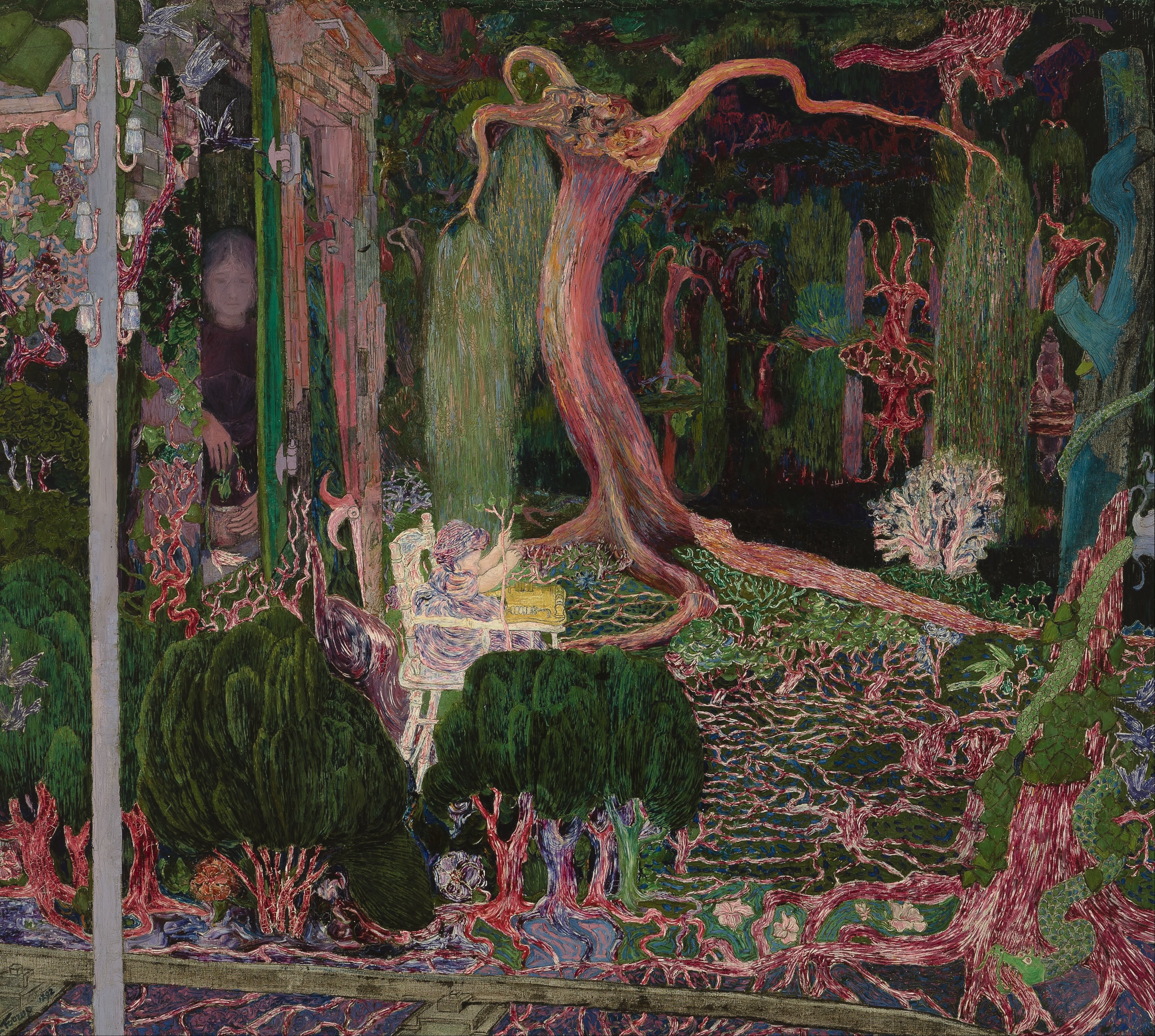
The New Generation (1892)

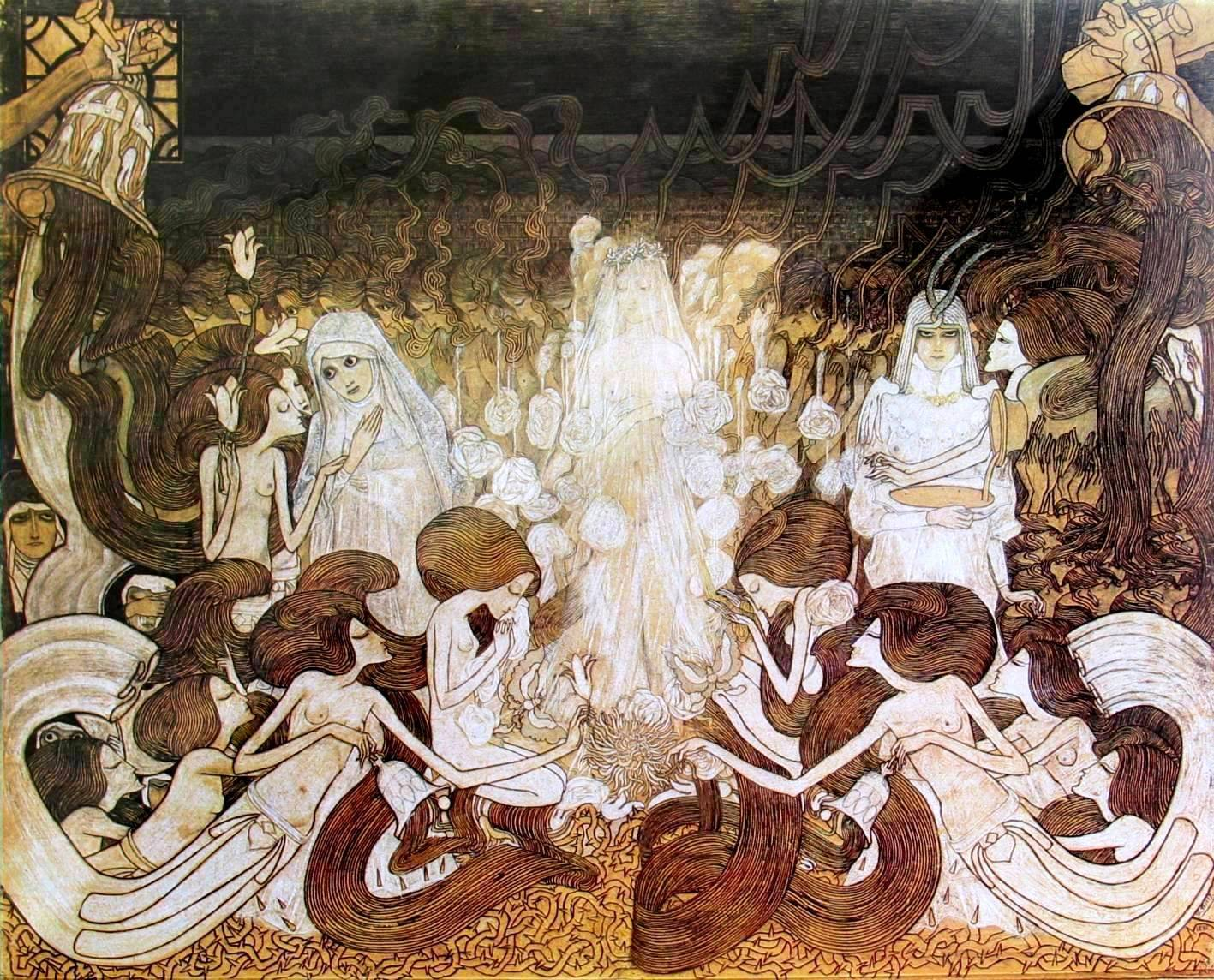
The Three Brides (1893)

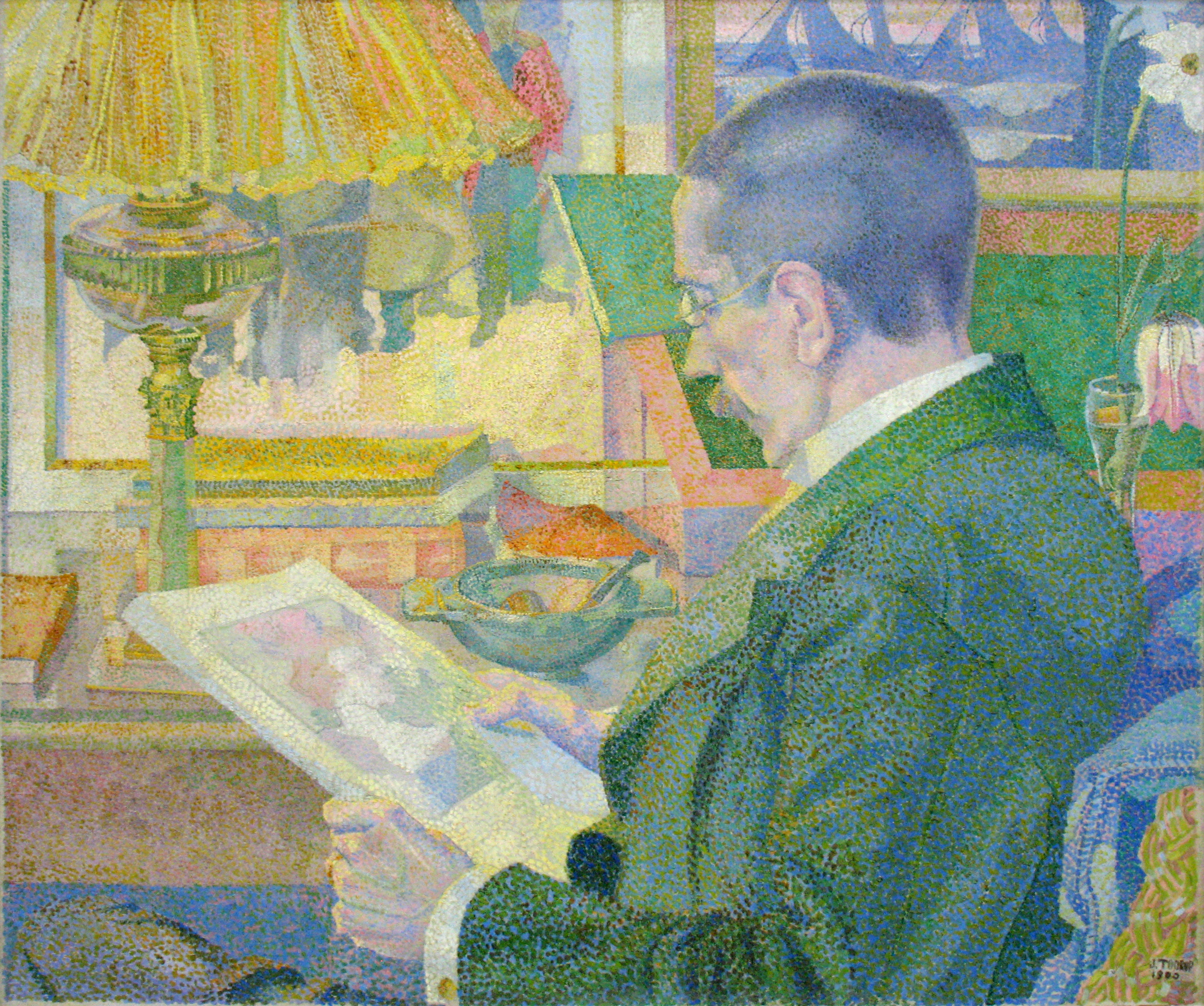
The connoisseur of prints (Dr. Aegidius Timmermann) (1900)

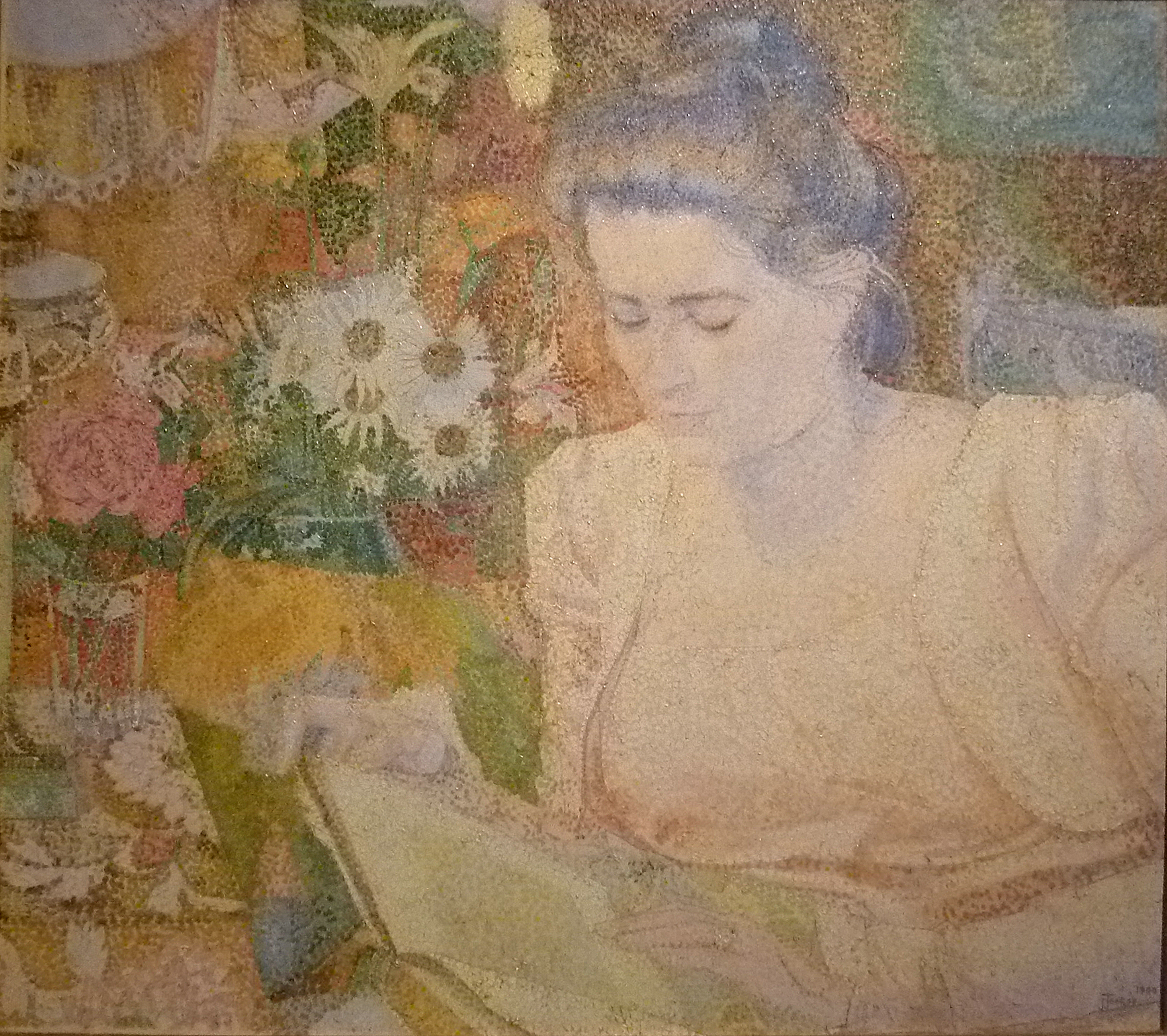
Portrait of Marie Jeanette de Lange (1900)

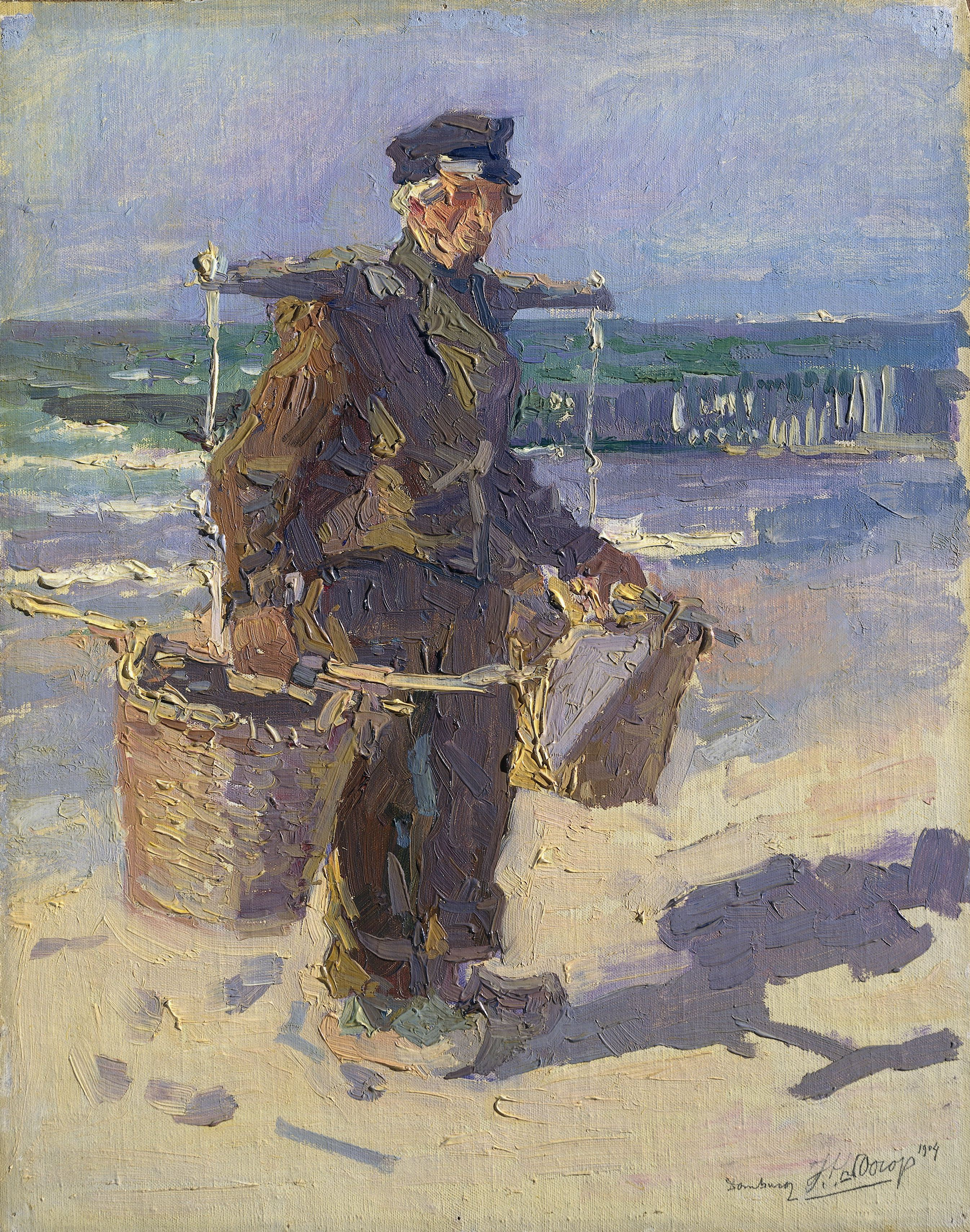
The Shell Fisher (1904)

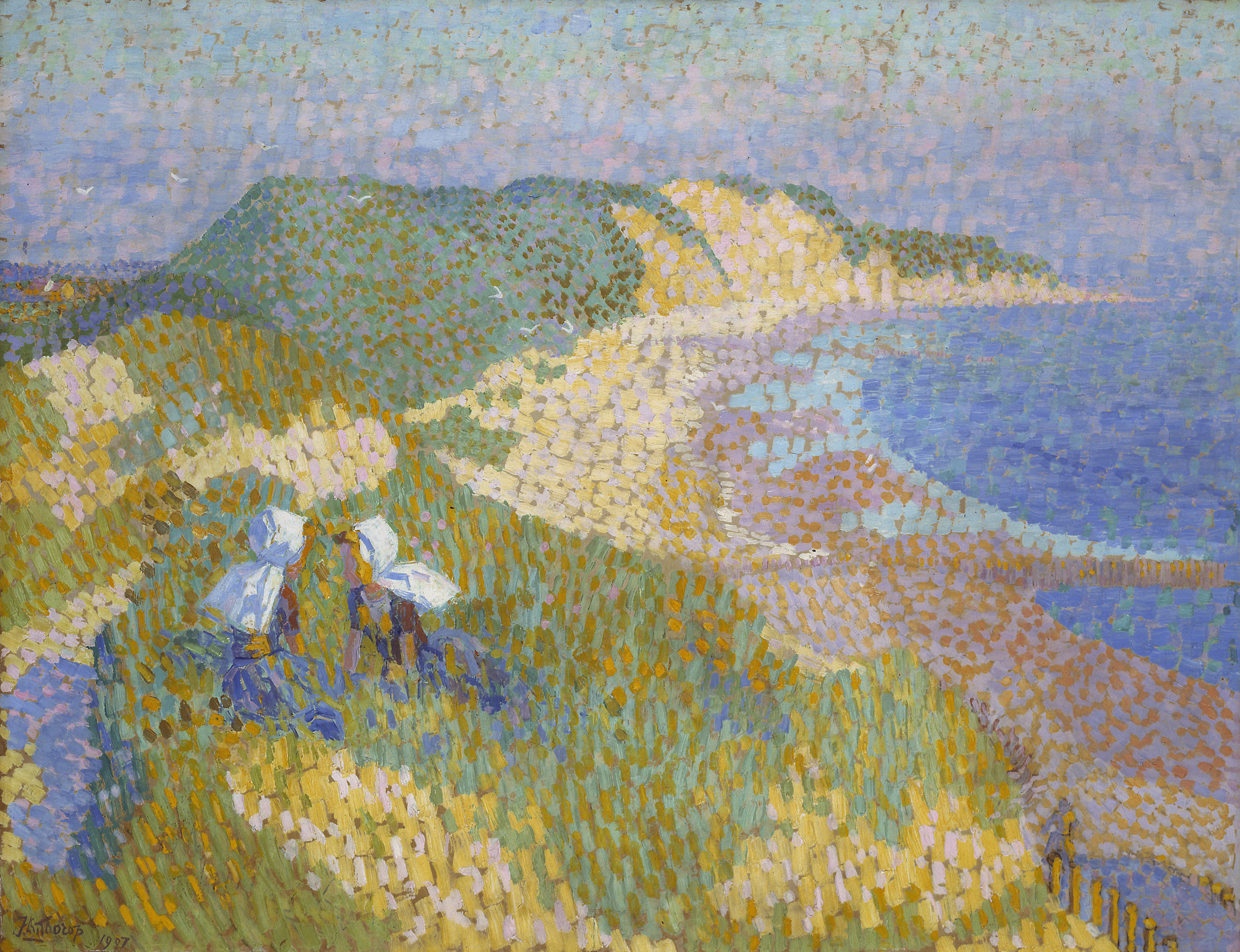
Dunes and sea in Zoutelande (1907)

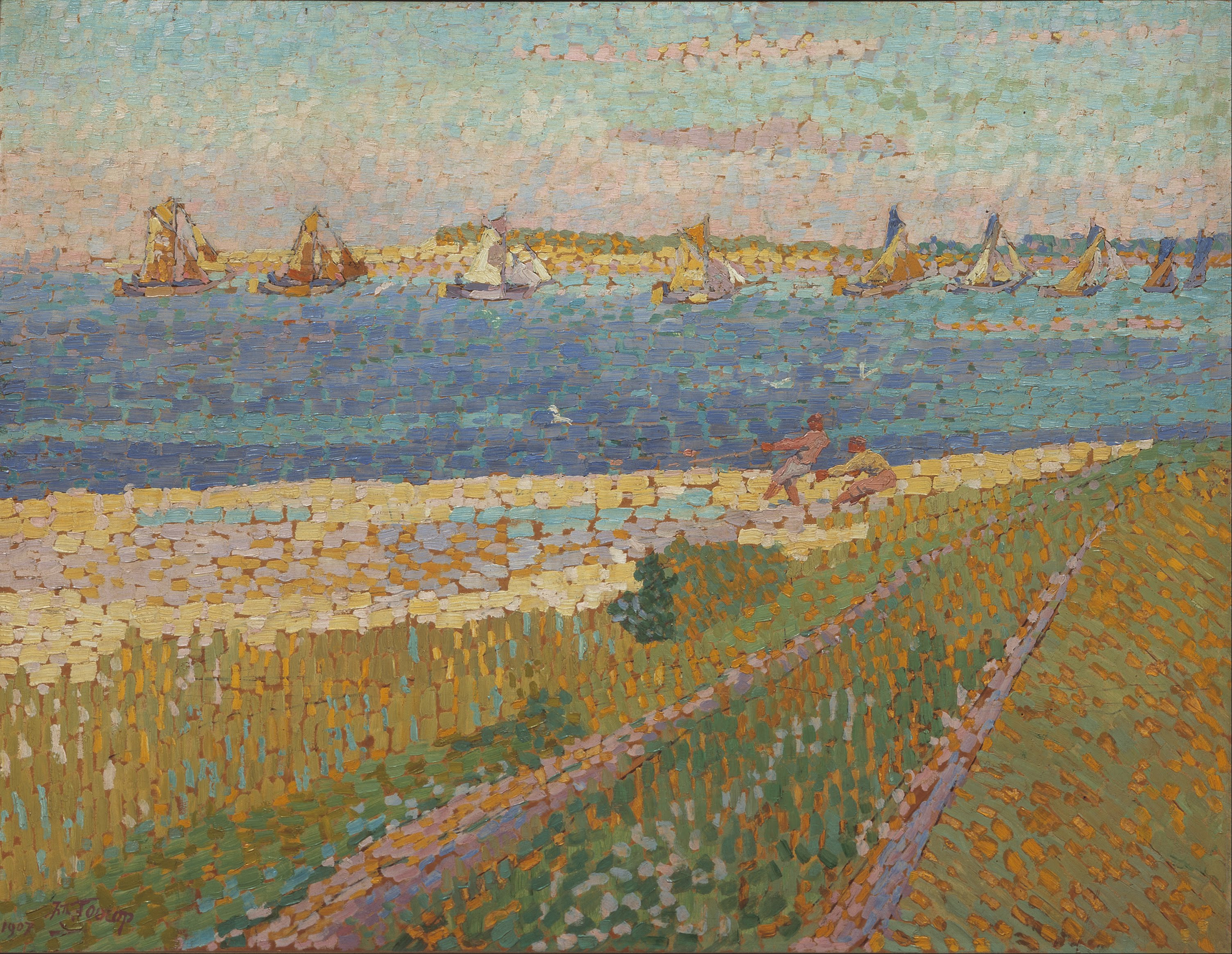
The Schelde near Veere (1907)

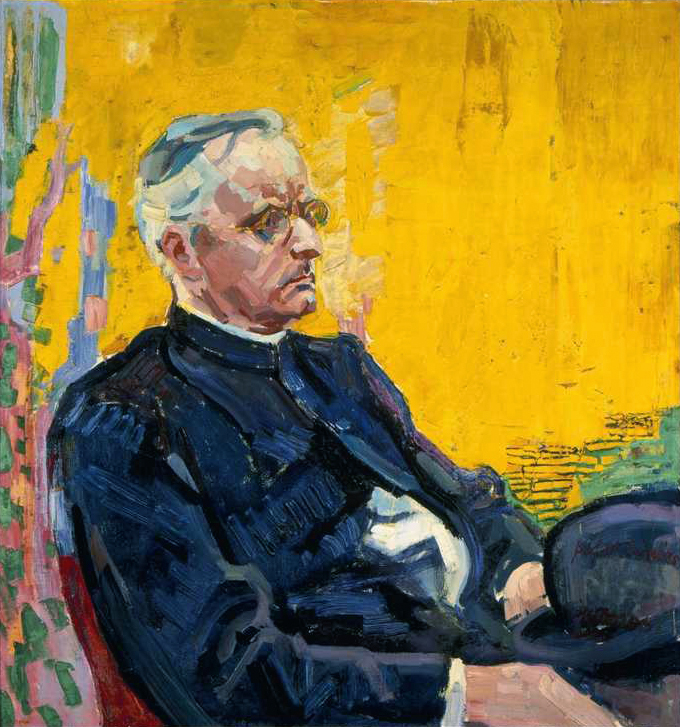
Portrait of Johann Heinrich Schrörs (1911)

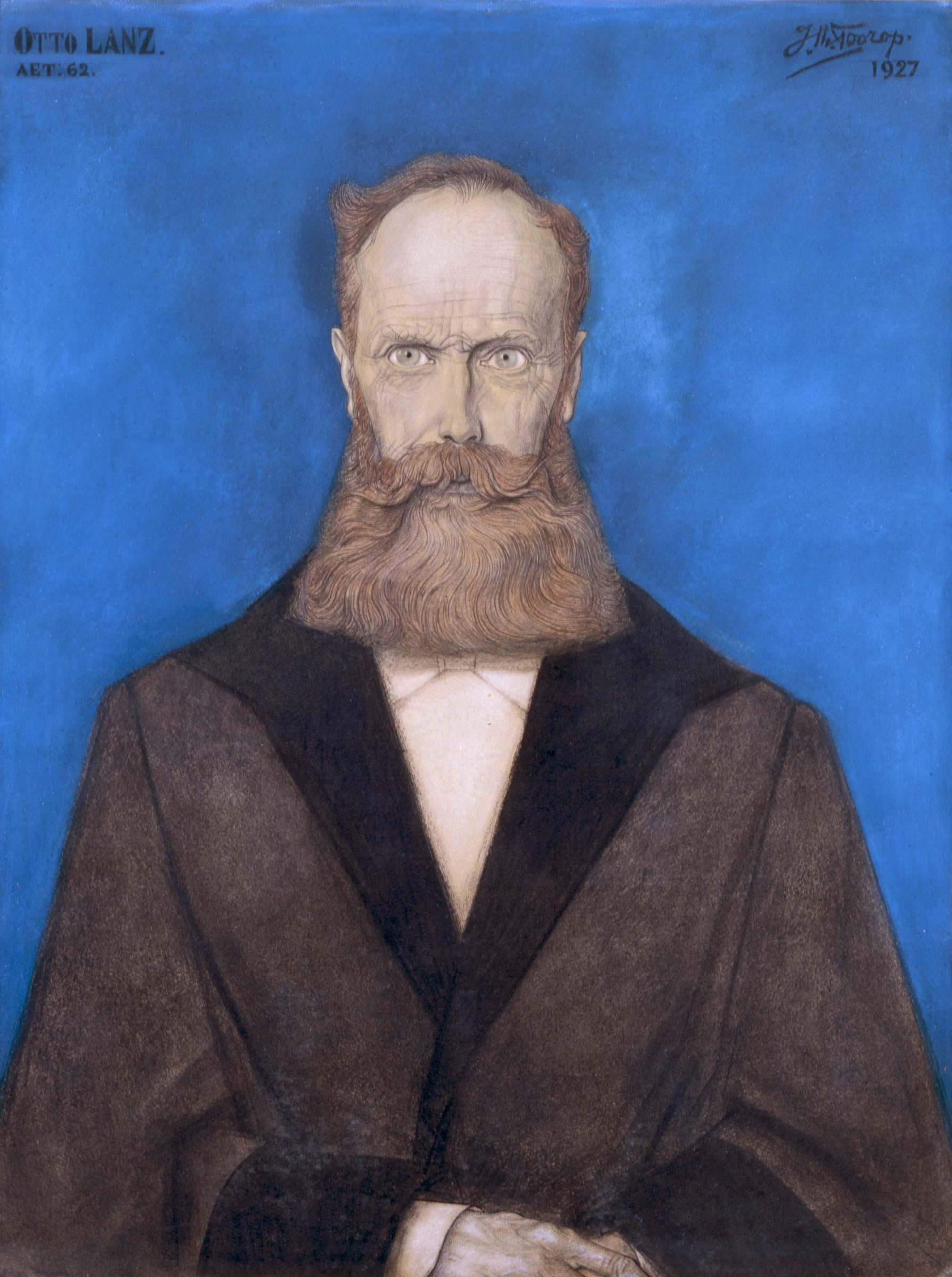
Portrait of Otto Lanz (1927)

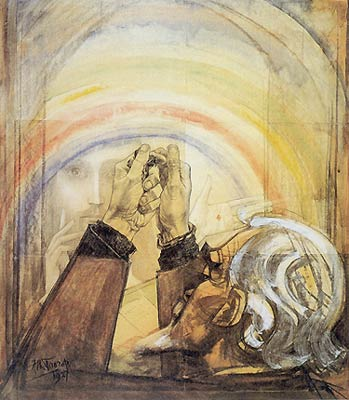
Self-portrait (1927)

=== Illustrations ===
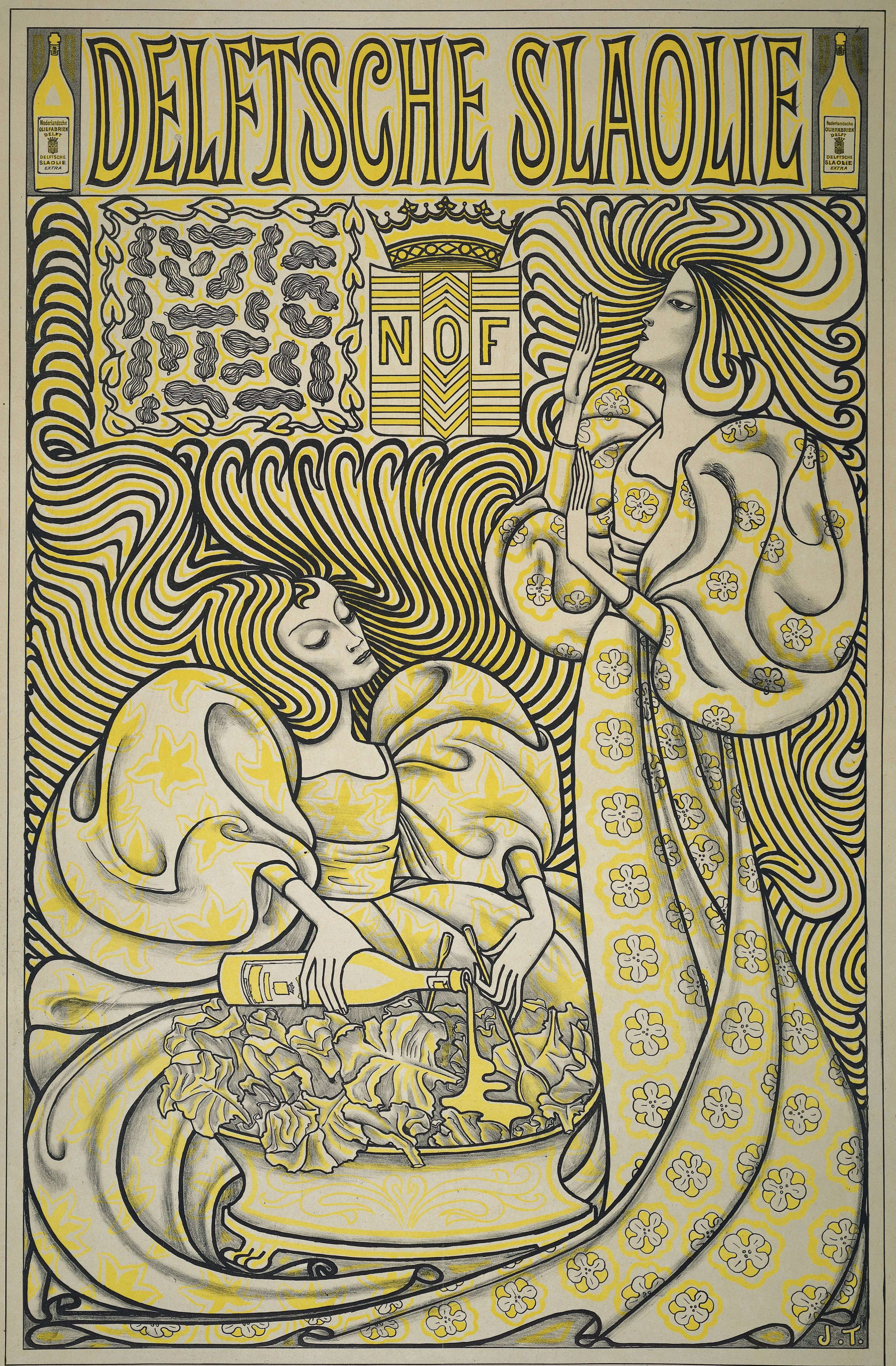
Delftsche Slaolie [Delft Salad Oil] (1893)

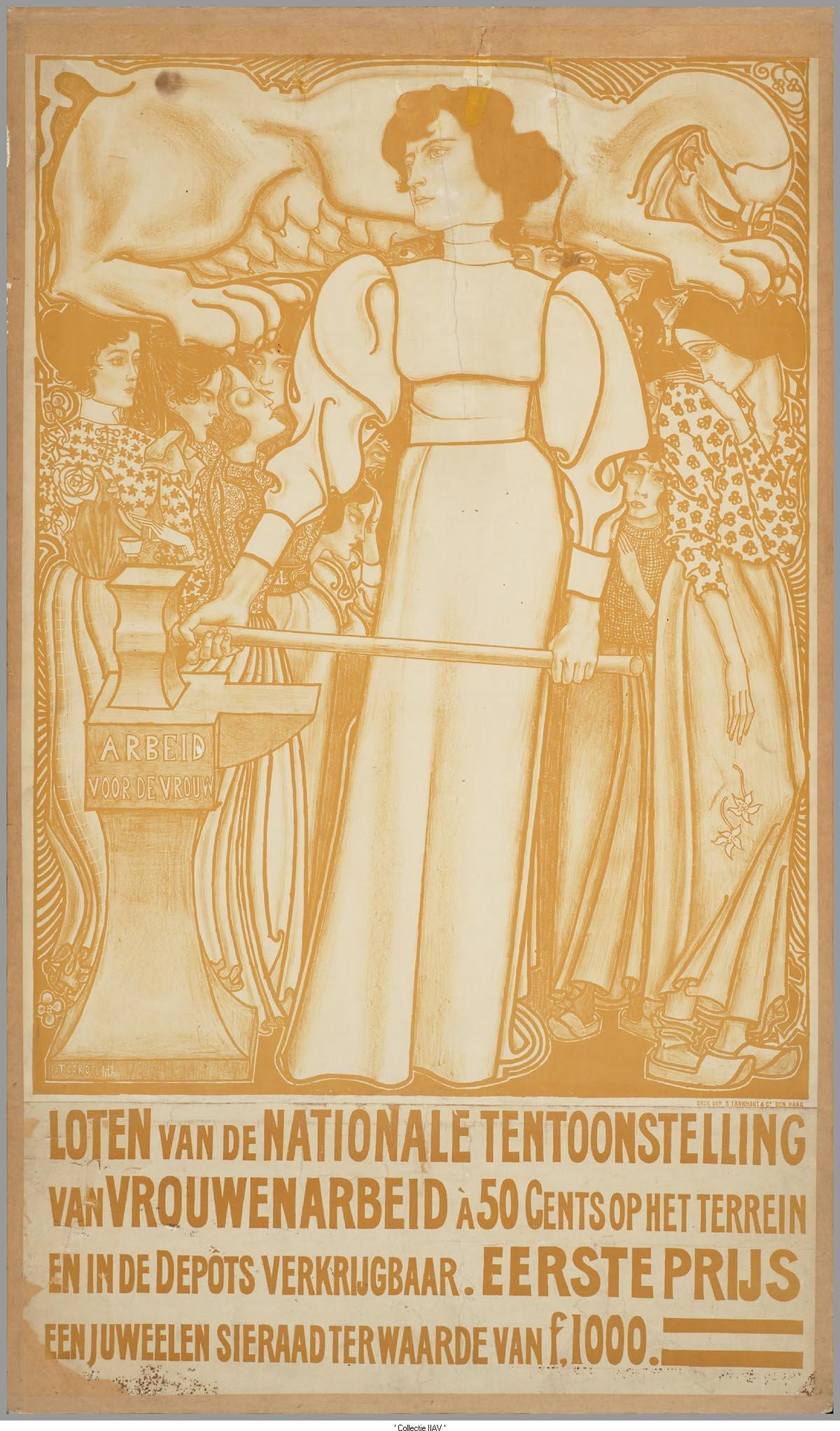
Poster for lottery tickets for the Tentoonstelling van Vrouwenarbeid, The Hague (1898)

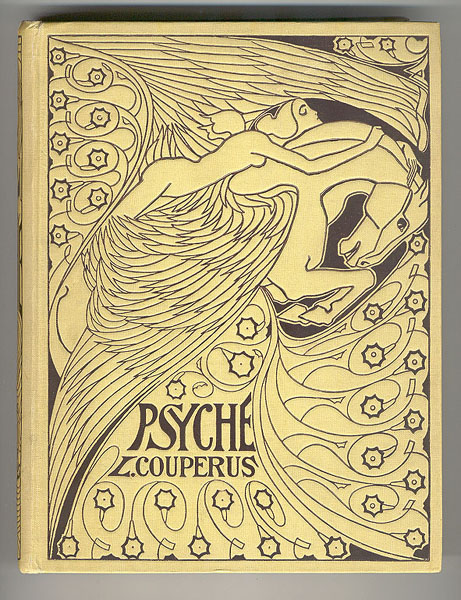
Book cover (1916) of Psyche (1898), a fairy tale written by Louis Couperus

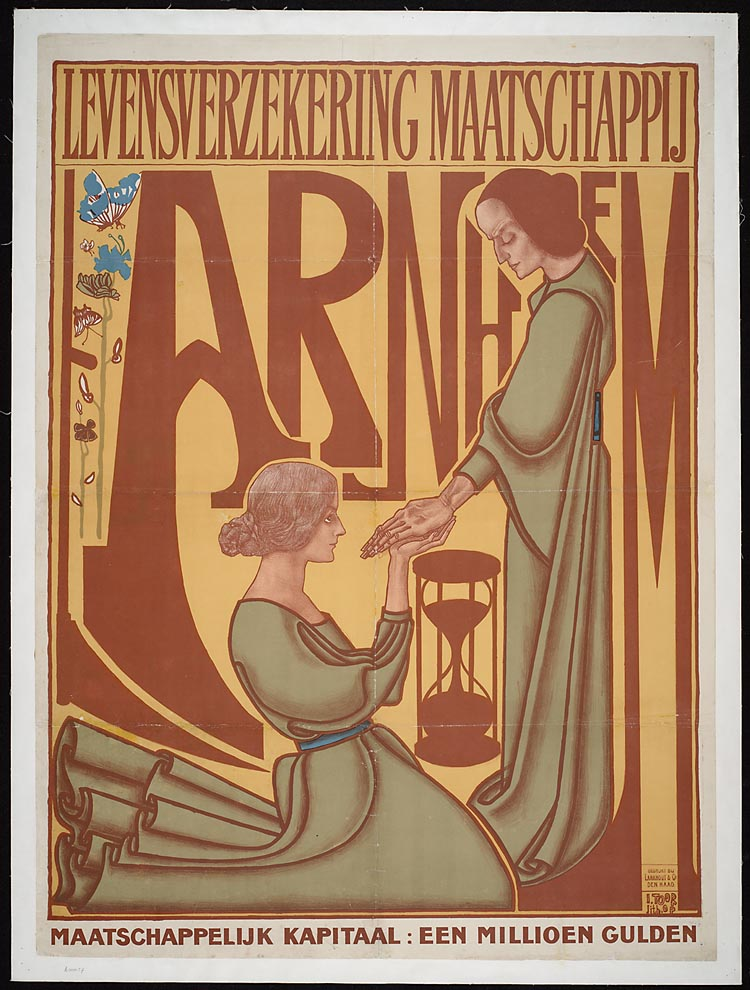
Levensverzekering-maatschappij Arnhem [Arnhem Life Insurance Company] (1900)
