= Charley Toorop =

Dutch painter and lithographer (1891–1955)

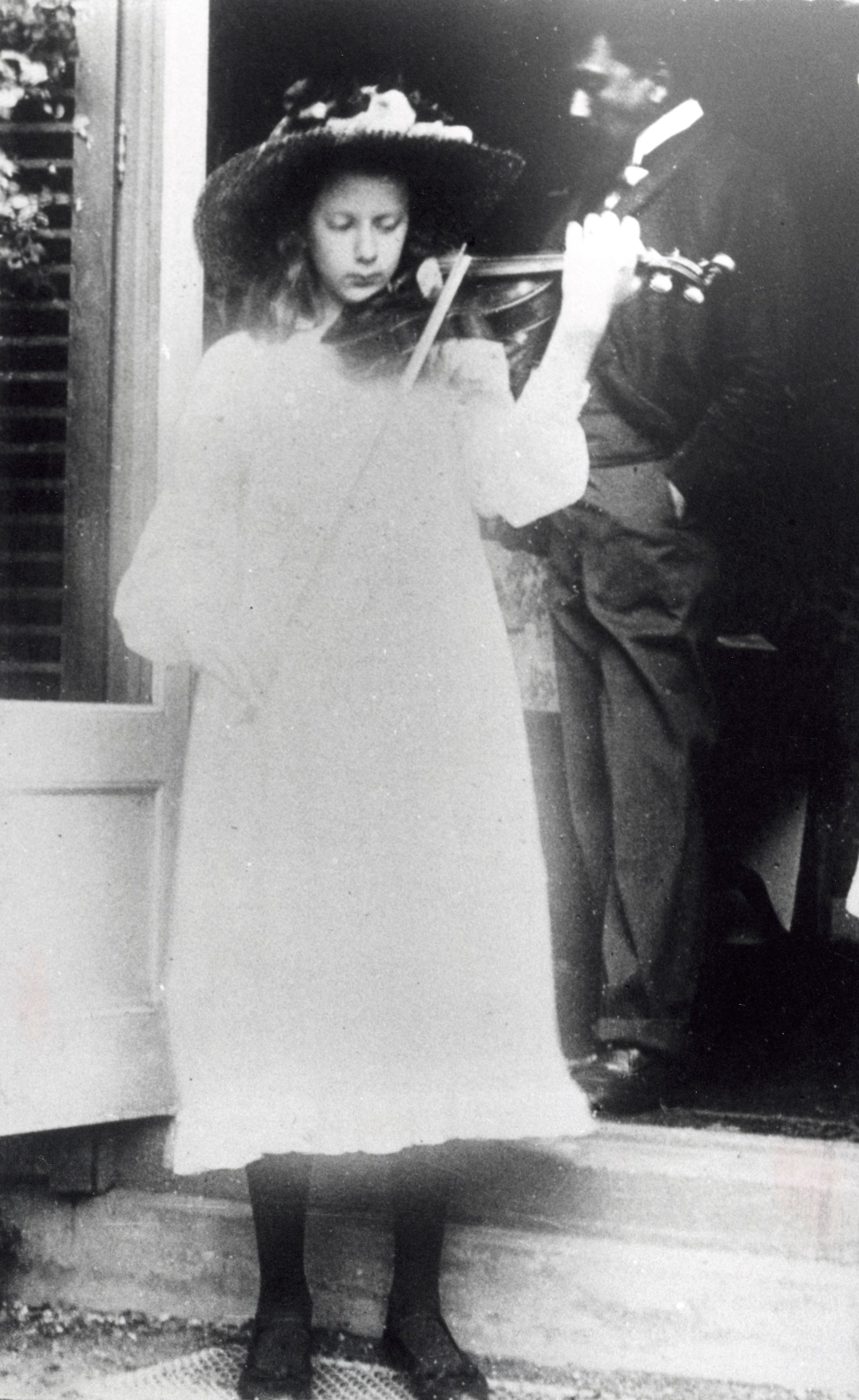
- Toorop in 1903
- Born: Annie Caroline Pontifex Fernhout-Toorop; 24 March 1891; Katwijk, Netherlands
- Died: 5 November 1955 (aged 64); Bergen, Netherlands
- Known for: Painting, printmaking

Annie Caroline Pontifex Fernhout-Toorop (24 March 1891 – 5 November 1955), known as Charley Toorop (Dutch pronunciation: [ˈtɕɑrli ˈtoːrɔp]), was a Dutch painter and lithographer.

== Life ==
Charley Toorop was born in Katwijk. She was the daughter of Jan Toorop and Annie Hall. She married the philosopher Henk Fernhout in May 1912, but they divorced in 1917. Her son Edgar Fernhout (1912–1974) also became a painter. Her other son, John Fernhout (1913–1987), became a filmmaker, and often worked together with Joris Ivens. As a filmmaker, he sometimes used the name John Ferno. Charley's daughter-in-law was the well known Jewish photographer Eva Besnyö (1910–2003), who married John in 1933.

In the online biography of the Dutch poet Hendrik Marsman from the Dutch Literary Museum Charley Toorop is mentioned as one of the women who had a relationship with Marsman before he married his wife Rien Barendregt in 1929.

== Work ==
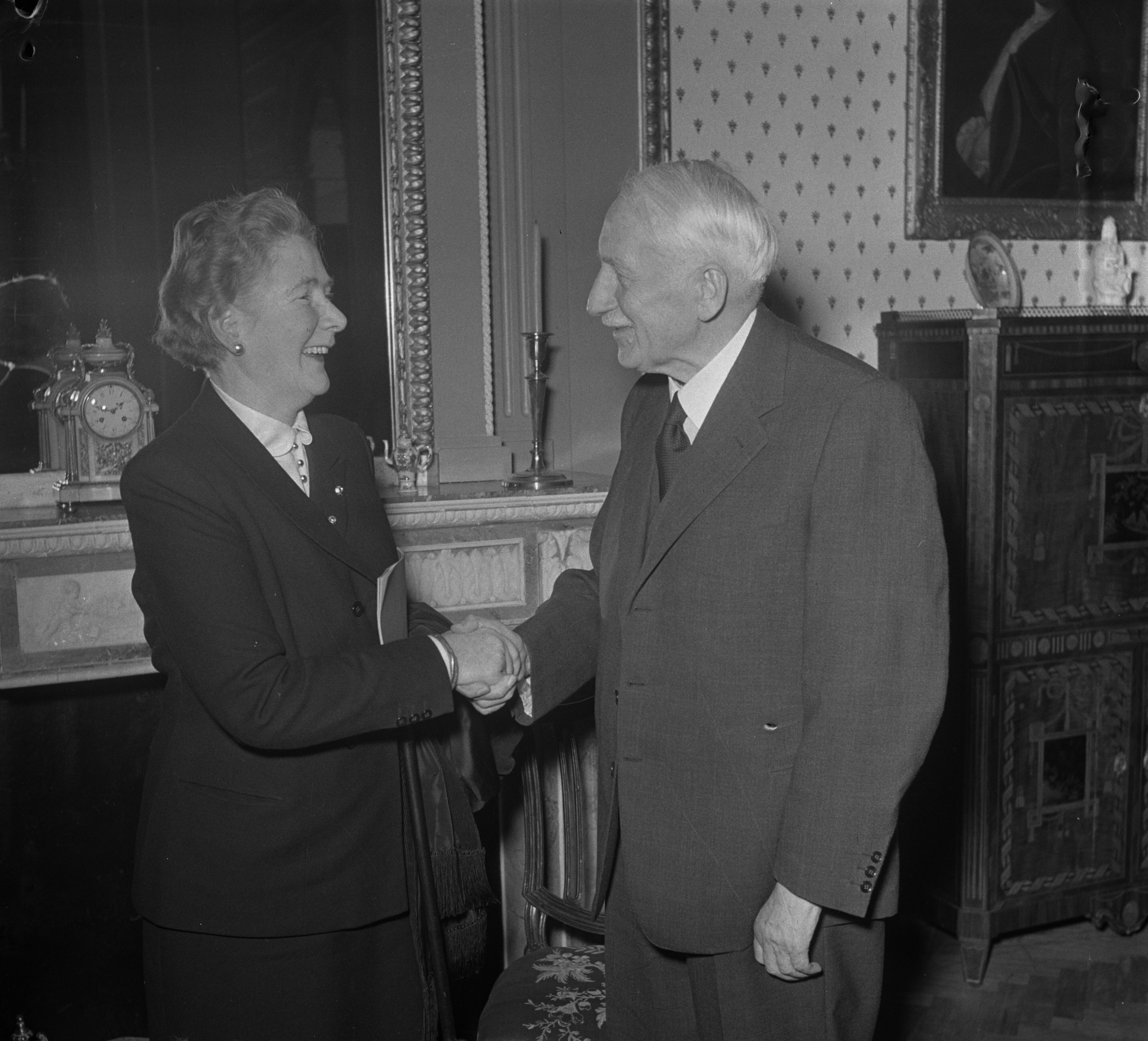
Charley Toorop and Maurits Uyldert in 1953

Toorop became a member of the group of artists called Het Signaal (The Signal) in 1916. The group aimed to depict a deep sense of reality through the use of colours and heavily accentuated lines and through fierce contrasts of colours. This is one of the reasons why Toorop is seen as adherent to the Bergense School.

Toorop befriended other artists, among them Bart van der Leck and Piet Mondriaan. In 1926 Toorop went to live for two years in Amsterdam, where her painting became influenced by film. She frontally depicted figures standing isolated from each other, as if they were lit by lamps at a movie set. Her still lifes show kinship to the synthetic cubism of Juan Gris. From the 1930s onwards, she painted many female figures, as well as nudes and self-portraits in a powerful, realistic style. Well-known is her large painting Three Generations (Drie generaties) (1941–1950; in the Museum Boijmans Van Beuningen, Rotterdam), which is a self-portrait, a portrait of her father and of her son Edgar, in which she unites both realism and a sense of symbolism.

Her ruthless realism has a magic touch. "Is the natural appearance reality," she wondered in 1917, "or can we sense in its form only the most unreal that appears before us? This unreal, which is the most real."

Toorop had lived at many different places, but from 1932 on she resided in Bergen, North Holland, where she'd previously had her home between 1912 and 1915 and again from1922 to 1926. There she designed and commissioned a house called "De Vlerken", situated at the Buerweg 19. The house is still there, although after a fire its thatched roof has been replaced by a tiled roof. Toorop died in Bergen on November 5, 1955. Her works are in many public collections, notably in the Kröller-Müller Museum in Otterlo.

One of her paintings featured in the exhibition called "How Van Gogh Came to Groningen", which opened at the Groninger Museum in November 2024, and which considered the circles of artists, art fans, and collectors who generated early Dutch interest in the works of Vincent Van Gogh.

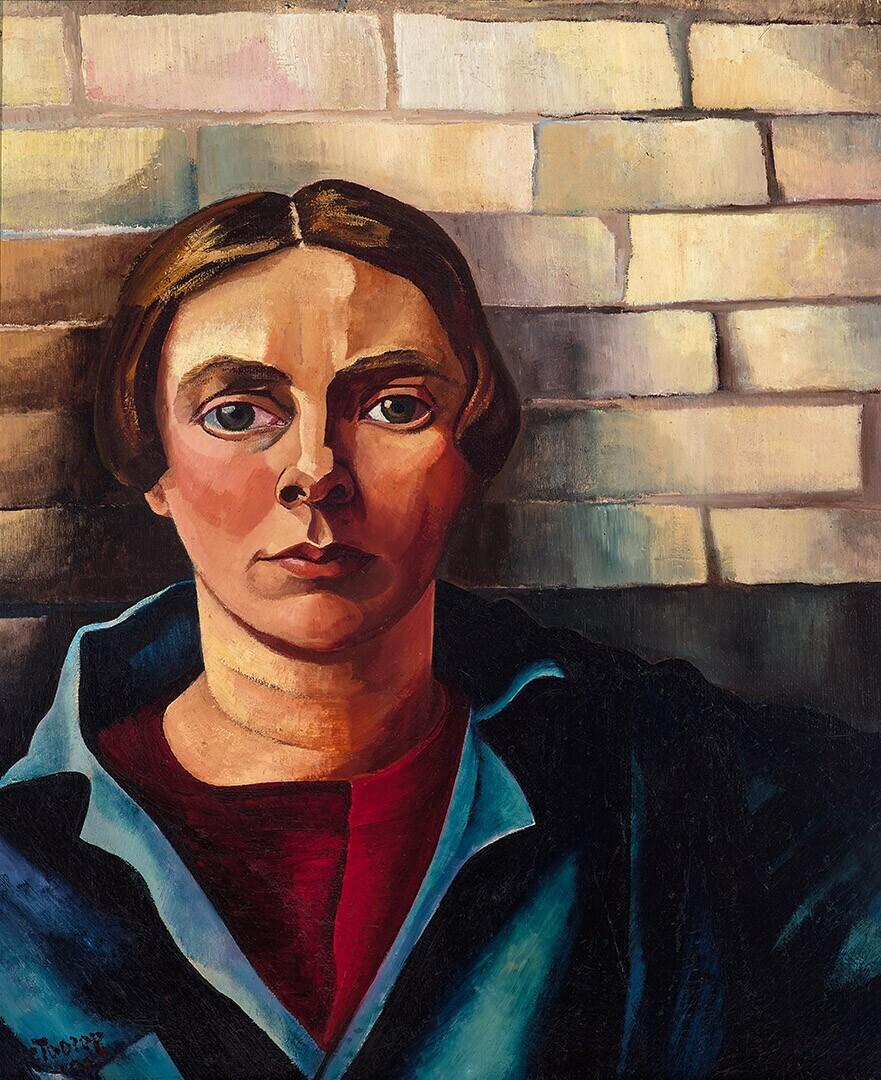
Self-portrait (against the wall) (1925)
(Museum Boijmans)

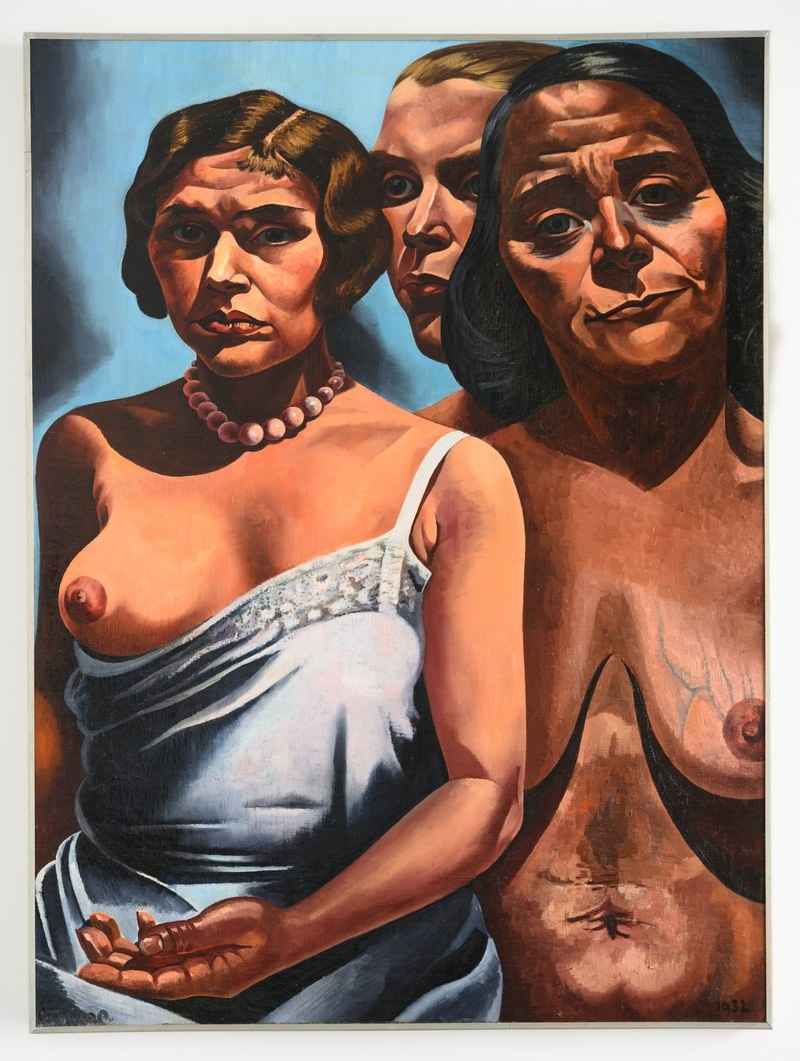
Three women (1931-1932)
(Van Abbemuseum)

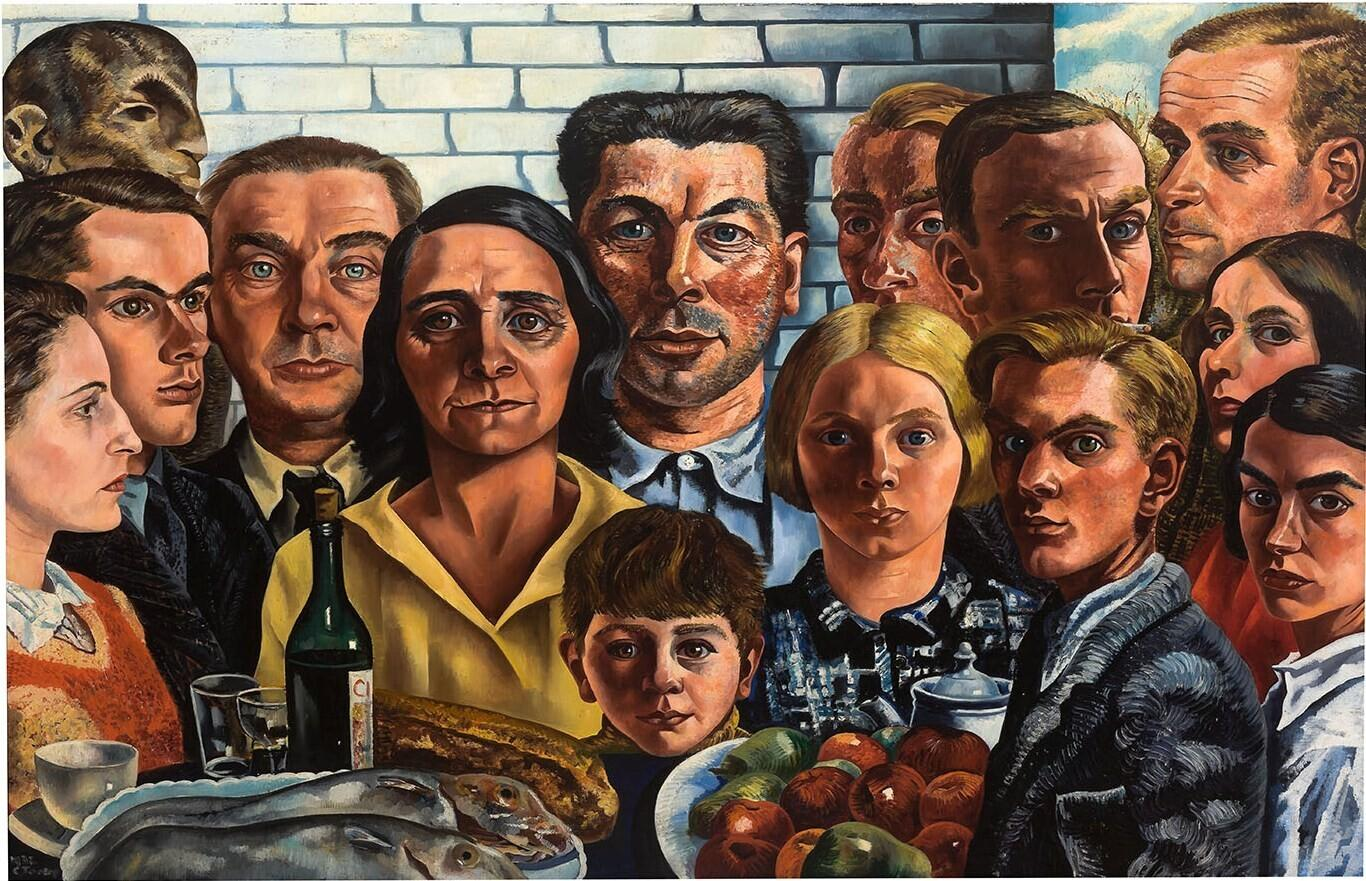
Dinner with friends (1935)
(Museum Boijmans)

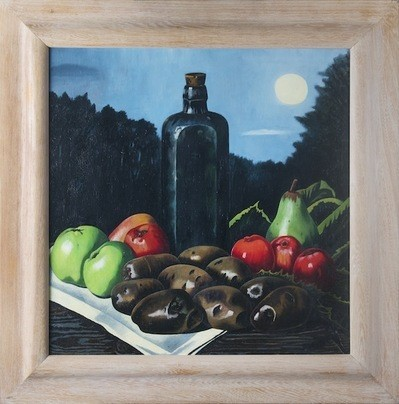
Still life with potatoes, bottle and fruit (1944) (Museum Arnhem)

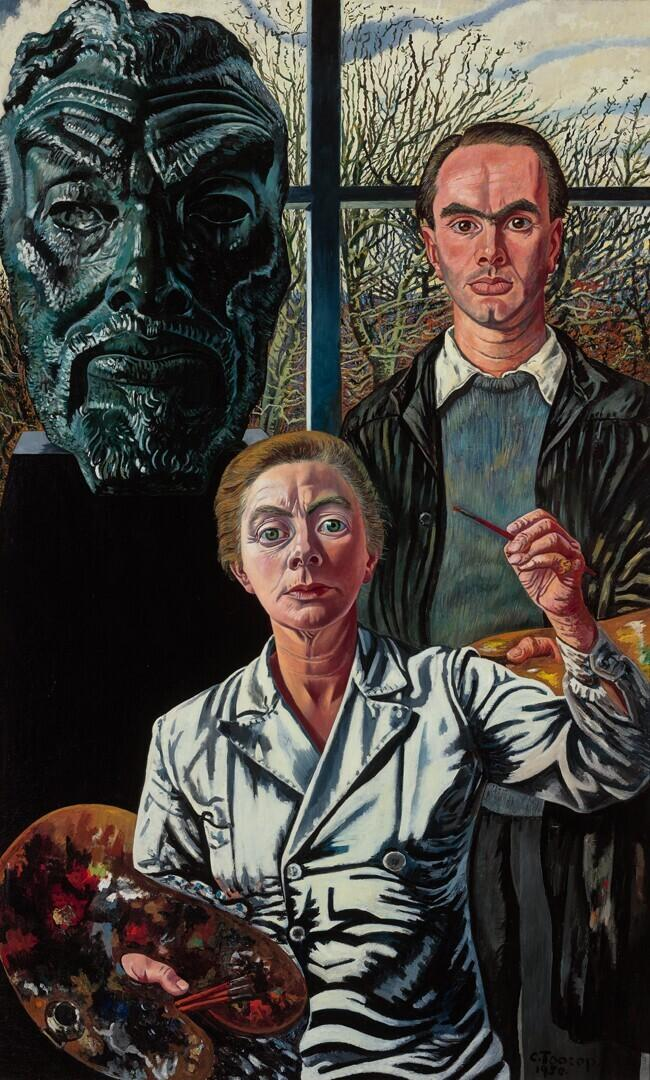
Three generations (1940s)
(Museum Boijmans)

== Literature ==
- Rembert, Virginia Pitts (2005) "Charley Toorop" in: Woman's Art Journal, 26, no. 2, (2005): 26–32.
- Bremer, Jaap B.J. (1995) "Charley Toorop : works in the Kröller-Müller Museum collection", Otterlo : Kröller-Müller Museum. ISBN 90-74453-15-5, ISBN 978-90-74453-15-8.
- Huber, Stephanie. “Charley Toorop (born Annie Caroline Pontifex Toorop),” The Modern Art Index Project (March 2024), Leonard A. Lauder Research Center for Modern Art, The Metropolitan Museum of Art. https://doi.org/10.57011/HQEJ3585.

== Exhibitions (selection) ==
- 19 February – 9 May 2010: 'Charley Toorop', Musée d'Art Moderne de la ville de Paris, Paris, France
- 11 November 2008 – 5 April 2009: "Werken op papier" - Charley Toorop (1891–1955) (prints), Museum Kranenburgh, Bergen, North Holland
- 27 September 2008 – 1 February 2009: the Museum Boijmans Van Beuningen in Rotterdam showed her work in the exhibition "Vooral geen principes!"
- 4 September 2004 – 13 March 2005: an exhibition of her work was held at the Groninger Museum in Groningen
- 12 January 1982 – 12 April 1982: retrospective exhibition of Charley Toorop in Centraal Museum in Utrecht

== Public collections ==
- Museum Boijmans van Beuningen in Rotterdam
- Museum Kranenburgh in Bergen, North Holland
- Kröller-Müller Museum in Otterlo
- Stedelijk Museum Alkmaar in Alkmaar
- Groninger Museum in Groningen
- Museum de Fundatie, Zwolle, The Netherlands
- Centraal Museum, Utrecht, The Netherlands
