= White people (disambiguation) =

White people is a racial classification, most often referring to people of European ancestry.

White People may also refer to:

- White People (album), a 2004 album by Handsome Boy Modeling School
- White People (short story collection), a 1991 short story collection by Allan Gurganus
- White People (film), a 2015 American documentary film
- "The White People", a fantasy-horror short story by the Welsh writer Arthur Machen
- Bai people, an ethnic group in China whose name (白) literally translates to "white", but are of Asian origin

== See also ==
- White woman (disambiguation)
- White man (disambiguation)
