= Broek in Waterland (painting) =

1889 oil painting by Jan Toorop

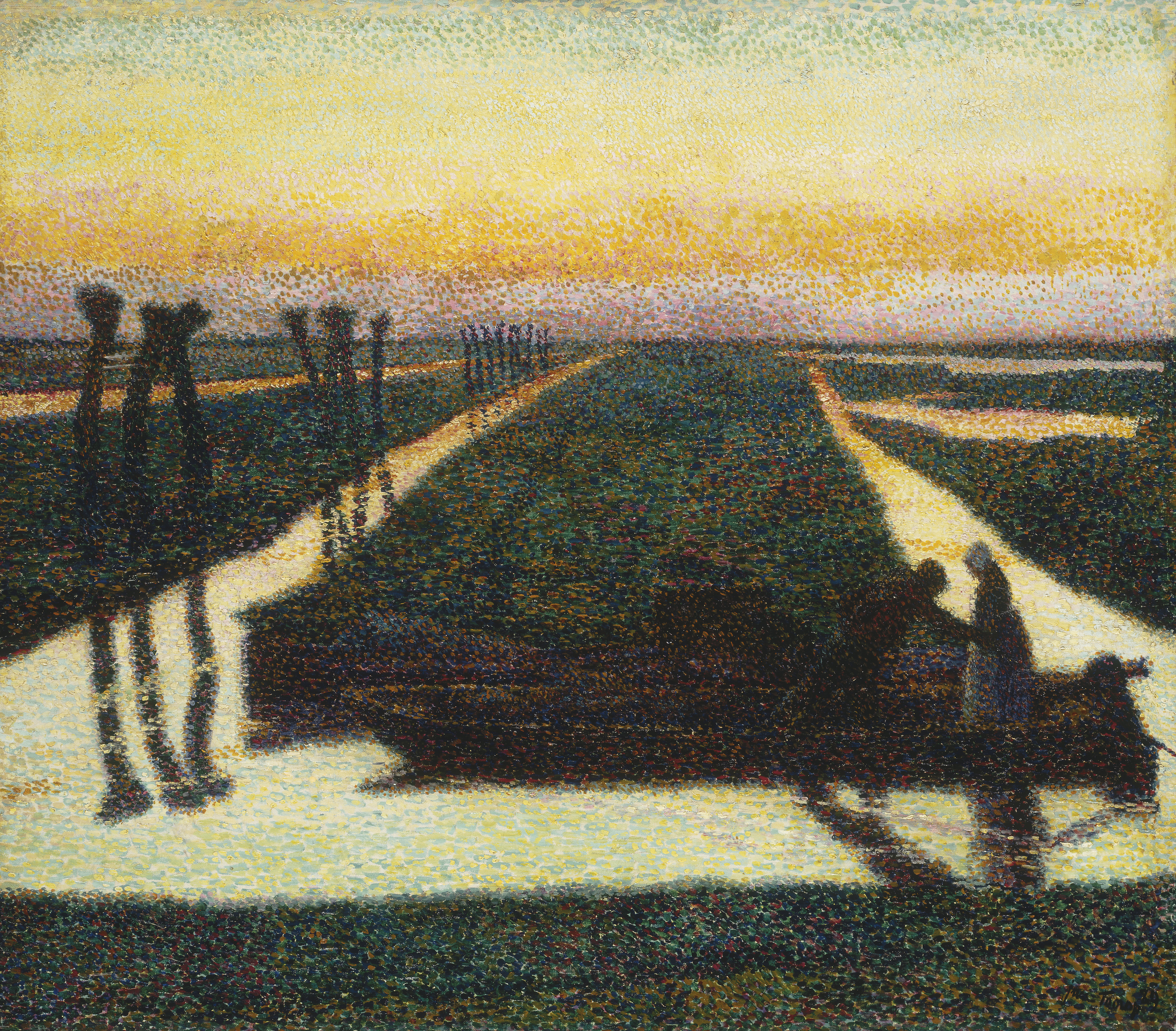
- Artist: Jan Toorop
- Year: 1889
- Type: Oil painting on canvas
- Dimensions: 69 cm × 76 cm (27 in × 30 in)
- Location: Indianapolis Museum of Art, Indianapolis

Broek in Waterland is an 1889 oil painting by Dutch-Indonesian artist Jan Toorop, located in the Indianapolis Museum of Art in Indianapolis, Indiana. It is a pointillist image of the Dutch village of Broek in Waterland at twilight.

== Description ==
After Seurat's work premiered in Brussels in 1887, Toorop eagerly added those methods to his own repertoire. He became the most influential Dutch Neo-Impressionist, although his canvases in that style are rare and he frequently ignored that school's tenants, particularly the color principles. Their pointillist brushwork he used more readily, as in this painting. The couple gliding through the water may reflect his empathy for working men and women, a common Neo-Impressionist sentiment.

Toorop gave this landscape a very strong, geometrical structure. The sharply receding diagonals of the canals are echoed by the naked trunks of the pollard willows. These intersect with the ribbons of color in the sunset, its rosy hues firmly contrasting with the deep blues and greens of the landscape below. Broek in Waterland was once coveted by the director of the Boymans Museum, who lauded its "'simple, usually disciplined structure,' 'distinction,' and controlled 'rhythmic composition.'"

== Historical information ==
In February 1889, Toorop traveled to Broek in Waterland with Emile Verhaeren, the Belgian poet and critic. Later that year, he painted this vivid image of the picturesque village, whose beauty had drawn emperors and tsars for centuries.

=== Acquisition ===
Broek in Waterland was acquired by the IMA in 2002 as a gift in memory of Robert S. Ashby by his family and friends. It currently hangs in the Robert H. & Ina M. Mohlman Gallery and has the acquisition number 2002.156.
