= Dame blanche (dessert) =

Ice cream dessert

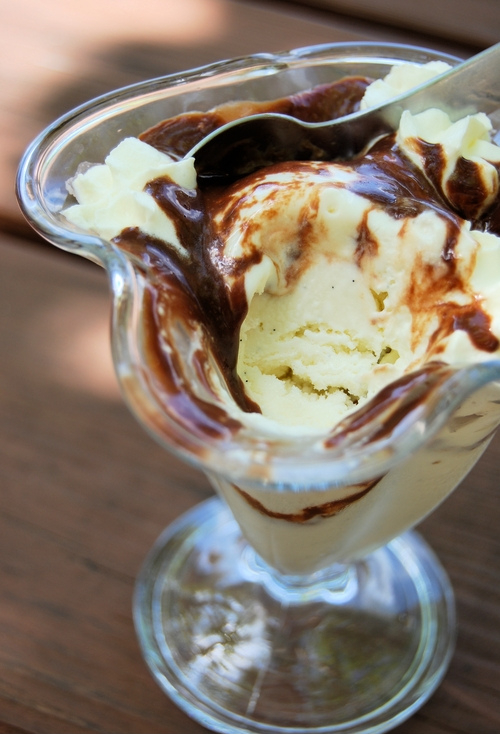
- Alternative names: Coupe Dänemark
- Course: Dessert
- Place of origin: Belgium, Germany
- Created by: Auguste Escoffier
- Serving temperature: Cold

Dame blanche (French, "fair lady" and literally, "white lady") is the name used in Belgium and the Netherlands for a sweet dessert consisting of vanilla ice cream with whipped cream and warm molten chocolate. In Germany and in Switzerland, the same type of dessert is known as a Coupe Dänemark. The dessert is similar to the American sundae. The dish that was created by Auguste Escoffier originally consisted of almond milk ice cream, poached peach, lemon sorbet and white currants.
