= The White Lady (Ireland) =

Coordinates: 52°8′15.90″N 7°02′45.95″W

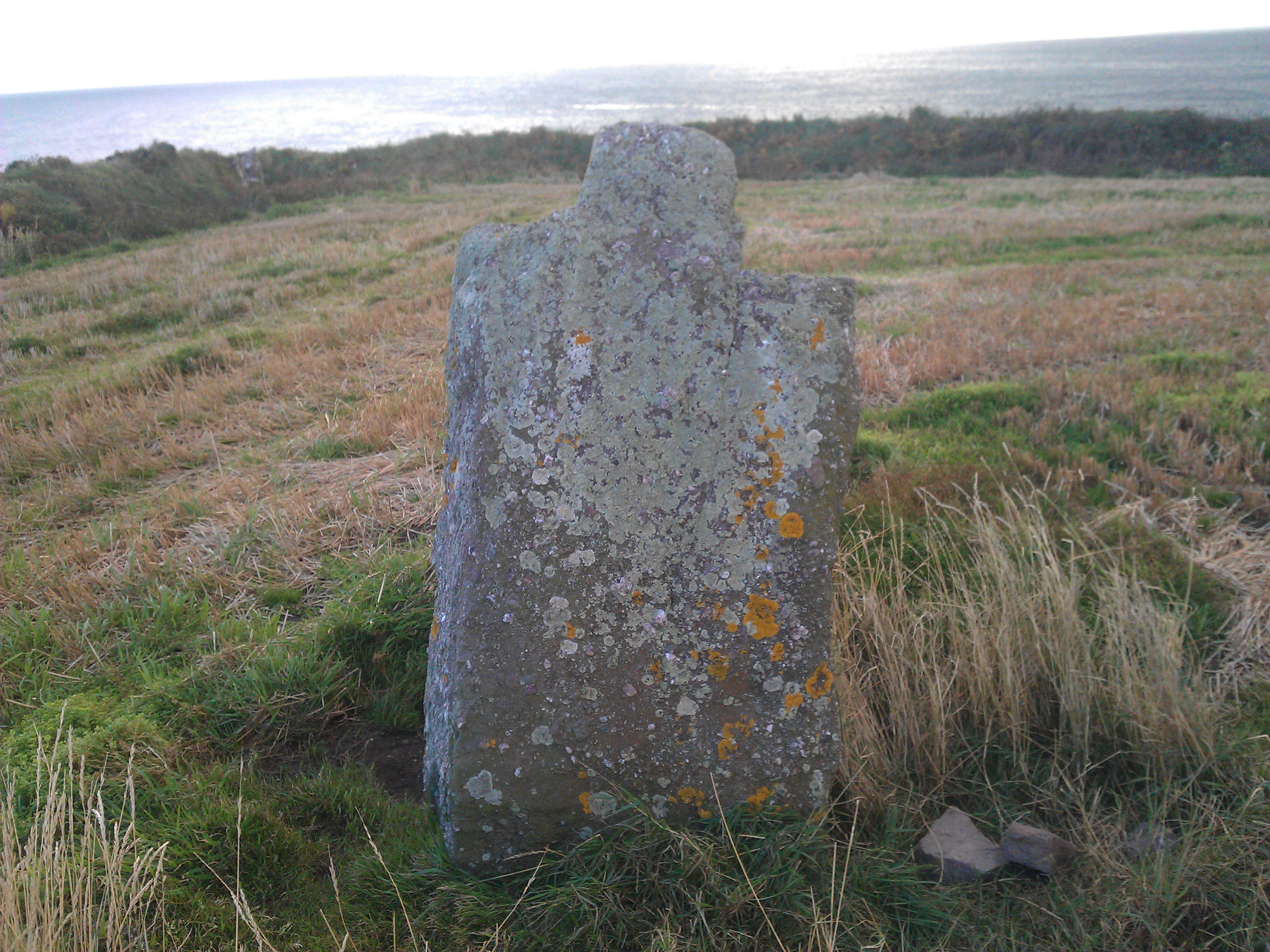
The White Lady Standing Stone in Dunmore East

The White Lady is an unusual standing stone, said to resemble a figure, located near the small fishing village of Dunmore East, in County Waterford, Ireland.

The standing stone is situated in open farmland overlooking the sea, between the small coves of Rathmoylan and Ballymacaw.

It is believed that the name White Lady is due to the standing stone having been whitewashed, or possibly painted white, at some point, although no traces of this remain. The purpose of the stone is not fully understood, it may have been erected as a marker to guide local fishermen, or it could have been an ancient symbolic or religious monument.
