= Lady in White (disambiguation) =

Lady in White may refer to:

- Lady in White, a 1988 American horror movie
- The Lady in White, a 1938 Italian comedy movie
- The Lady in White (film), a 1962 Swedish mystery film
- Lady in White (Toorop), an 1886 painting
- Lady in White (Bracquemond), an 1880 painting
- "The Lady in White" (American Horror Story), an episode of the TV series
- The Lady in White (Perla Siedle Gibson), a singer in Durban during World War II

== See also ==
- Ladies in White, a Cuban opposition movement
- White Lady (disambiguation)
- The Woman in White (disambiguation)
