= Lady in White (Toorop) =

1886 painting by Jan Toorop

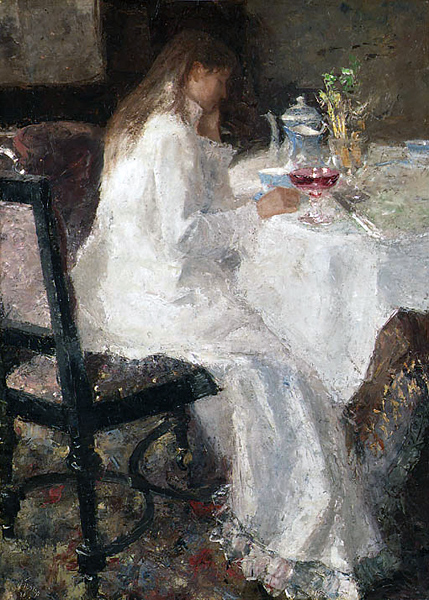
- Artist: Jan Toorop
- Year: 1886
- Medium: Oil on canvas
- Dimensions: 100 cm × 74 cm (39 in × 29 in)
- Location: Stedelijk Museum Amsterdam; Amsterdam, Nederlands

Lady in White is an impressionist painting of a woman wearing a white robe, from 1886, by Dutch painter Jan Toorop.

== Painting ==
The painting shows an intense, almost plain white colour on the woman's robe, contrasted with dark tones in the background, in an almost monochrome color palette. Beside the woman, there is a radiant circle of a wine glass filled with red wine. Toorop portrays his future wife in a manner influenced by James Ensor and James McNeill Whistler's Impressionist style.

== Annie Hall ==
The model is Annie Hall (1860-1929), an English woman who was studying in Brussels when Toorop met her in 1885. They got married in 1886. Toorop painted several paintings of Annie, in which she is depicted in similar white robes.

In 1883 while in Brussels Toorop allied himself with a group of avant-garde young artists called Les Vingt ("the twenty"), a group he eventually joined in 1885. The artists of "Les Vingt" and especially James Ensor strongly influenced him during this period.

In 1884 Toorop made a trip to London with his friend Emile Verhaeren and the art critic Georges Destrée. At the end of 1885, he returned to England for several months, where he lived on the estate of Annie Hall's parents. During his stay in England, Toorop became very impressed by the work of James McNeill Whistler, whose paintings he had encountered during an exhibition by Les Vingt in 1884. On the introduction of Lawrence Alma-Tadema he visited Whistler's studio in London; between 1885 and 1887 Whistler's work was a great inspiration for Toorop.

The influence of James McNeill Whistler on this portrait of Annie Hall is unmistakably reflected in the dominant use of a brightly illuminated white in Annie's dress and embroidery. The presence of the aestheticist beauty ideal is clearly recognizable. Toorop made several portraits of Annie Hall during the period 1885-1887 in the same style, evoking memories of the "symphonies" Symphony in White, No. 1: The White Girl; Symphony in White, No. 2: The Little White Girl, and Symphony in White, No. 3 that Whistler made at that time.

In Toorop's Lady in White from the end of 1886, he still seems to be inspired by Whistler more emphatically than in the other portrait he made of Annie called Portrait of Annie Hall in Lissadell. The atmosphere is generally dreamy and melancholic.
