= William Carlos Williams (band) =

American jazz group

William Carlos Williams are an Atlanta-based jazz group with death metal influences. The five-man group was founded by Stewart Voegtlin, Wes Daniel, and Rob Parham. Gold Sparkle Band saxophonist Rob Mallard and Andrew Burnes joined shortly after in 1995. The group released two albums, White Women (1997) and Collection Plate (1998).
