= Giulia Occhini =

Lover of cyclist Fausto Coppi (1922–1993)

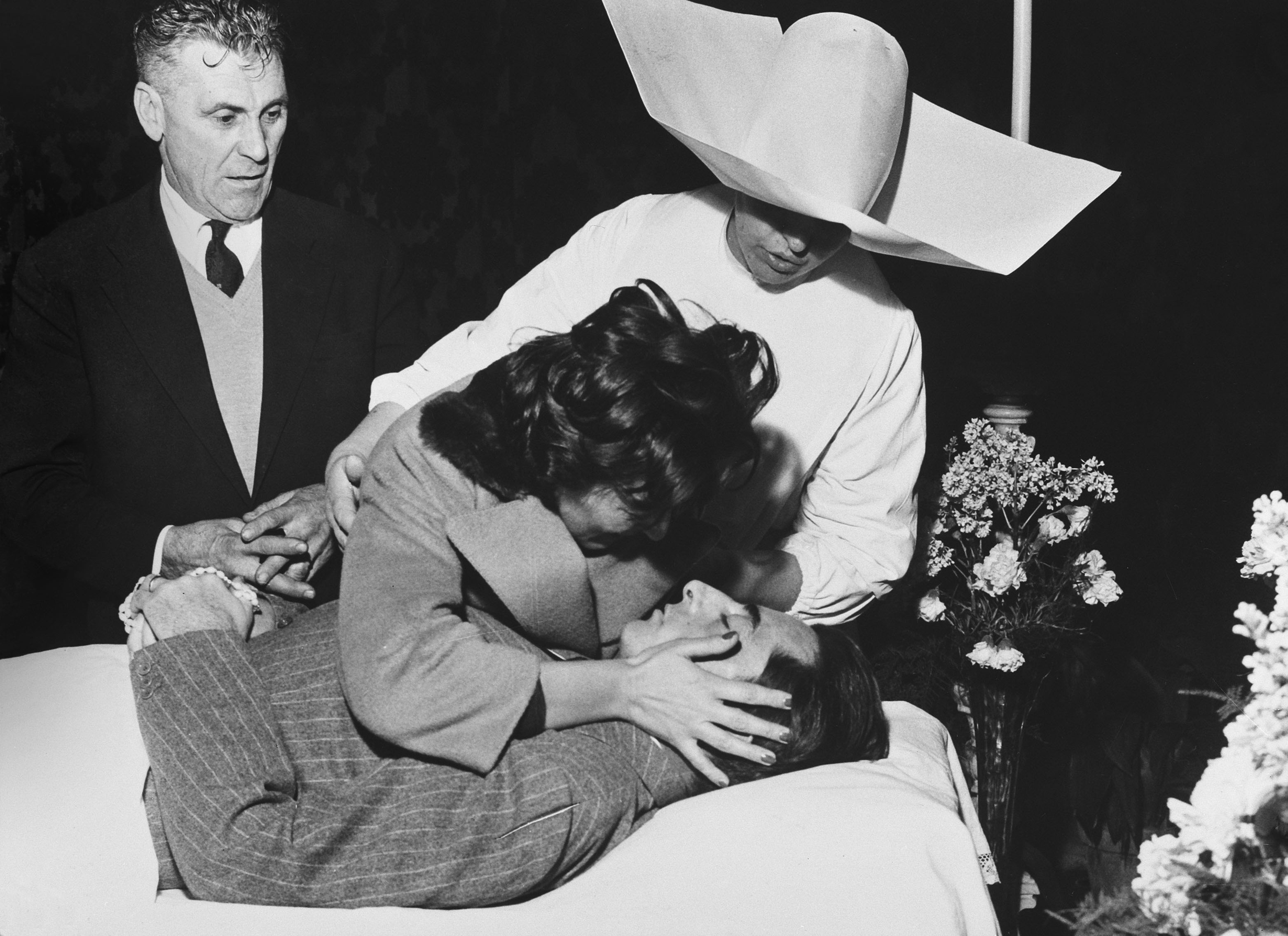
- Giulia Occhini at the funeral of Fausto Coppi in 1960
- Born: 23 July 1922; Varano Borghi, Italy
- Died: 6 January 1993 (aged 70); Novi Ligure, Italy

Giulia Occhini (23 July 1922 – 6 January 1993), known as "La Dama Bianca" (“The White Lady”), was the lover of champion cyclist Fausto Coppi in a scandalous extramarital affair of the 1950s.

Given Coppi’s high profile, this affair led to the shift in attitudes among the Christian Democrats in Italy towards the moral and legal aspects of adultery. At the time in Italy, divorce was not permitted and adultery was still a crime. Occhini herself was tried for abandoning her marriage. Her story became emblematic of the conformist and repressive climate of that period.

Her nickname originated after the 1954 St. Moritz stage of the Giro d'Italia, when Pierre Chany, a journalist with L'Équipe, wrote: "We would like to know more about that lady in white (dame en blanc) we saw near Coppi,” referring to the snow-coloured duffel coat she wore.

== Biography ==
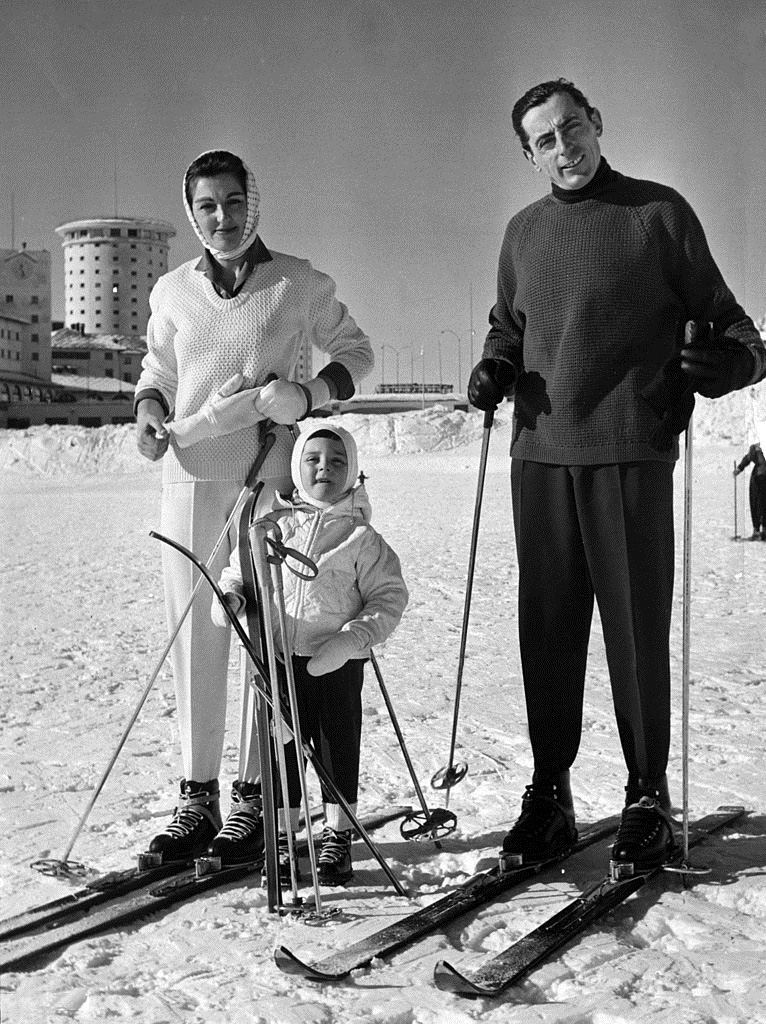
Fausto Coppi, Giulia Occhini and their son in 1959

Occhini was married to Enrico Locatelli, a medical practitioner in Varano Borghi, and who was a passionate fan of Coppi. She met Fausto Coppi during the 1953 Tour at the end of the Passo dello Stelvio stage and publicly appeared with the "Campionissimo" at the World Championships Prize 1953 in Lugano. Their friendship started in 1948 when Locatelli had asked his wife to obtain an autograph of the "Campionissimo" at the end of the Tre Valli Varesine. Later Occhini entered into correspondence with Coppi, who, solicited by Locatelli, personally met his family in a short visit to Varese. A romance began between Occhini and Coppi and they spent the summer together as lovers in 1953, vacationing in Capri.

Since they were both married, the relationship aroused great scandal at that time and was strongly opposed by public opinion, particularly by Fausto Coppi's fans. Occhini was even the recipient of Pope Pius XII's public condemnation. Coppi and his wife, Bruna Ciampolini, consensually separated in 1954, while Locatelli denounced Occhini for adultery. As a result of this, according to Italian law of time, the lovers having been caught “in flagrante”, the woman was punished with a month's imprisonment in Alessandria and then a period of house arrest in Ancona. Coppi’s passport was withdrawn. Among these many difficulties, Coppi and Occhini married in Mexico (a marriage never recognized in Italy) and Occhini gave birth to a son, Angelo Fausto Coppi, who was born on May 13, 1955, in Buenos Aires.

Coppi died of malaria on January 2, 1960, which he caught on a trip to Burkina Faso.

Giulia Occhini was admitted to San Giacomo Hospital in Novi Ligure following injuries sustained in a car accident that occurred just in front of Villa Coppi in hamlet Barbellotta of Novi Ligure on 3 August 1991 on board a Fiat Tipo, driven by a family friend, who was hit by a Volkswagen Golf GTI with two young people on board. She died on January 6, 1993, after having been in a coma for almost a year and a half. Giulia Occhini is buried in the new graveyard of Serravalle Scrivia, next to her daughter Loretta "Lolli" Locatelli (1946–1971), who died of leukemia.

== Bibliography ==
- Adriano De Zan, Pier Augusto Stagi, Gentili signori e signore buongiorno. Cinquant'anni di ciclismo, Milano, Baldini&Castoldi, 1999, ISBN 88-8089-448-X.
- Gabriele Moroni, Fausto Coppi. Solitudine di un campione, Milano, Mursia, 2009, ISBN 88-425-4358-6.
