= White Man =

White Man may refer to:

- White Man (film), a 1924 film by Louis J. Gasnier
- A ring name for professional wrestler Alberto Muñoz in the 1970s
- A song from the 1976 album A Day at the Races by Queen
- The White Man, an 1860s newspaper published in North Texas.

== See also ==
- White people (disambiguation)
- Whiteman (disambiguation)
