= Rådande =

Tree spirits in Swedish faerie mythology

Rådande or löfjerskor are tree spirits in Swedish faerie mythology, similar to the dryads and hamadryads of Greek and Roman mythology.

In Swedish folklore, a rå is a spirit connected to a place, object or animal; examples are the skogsrå (a forest being) and sjörå (a water being). Thus, the word rådande or råande may derive from rå and ande, "spirit". It may also be a corruption of trädande (plural trädandar), meaning tree spirit). Rå and råd-ande (with a hyphen) are attested in Jacob Mörk's political satire novel "Adalriks och Göthildas Äfventyr" published in Stockholm in 1742.

Benjamin Thorpe translates rådande as "elf" and identifies them with löfjerskor, or grove-folk. He explains that sacred groves were supposed to be protected by deities. A tree that grew unusually fast was a "habitation-tree" or boträd, and an invisible Radande was believed to live in its shade, rewarding those who cared for the tree and punishing any who harmed it.
