= Karin Svensdotter =

Character in Swedish folklore

Karin Svensdotter was a 17th-century Swedish woman who claimed to have had children with the King of the fairies.

In 1656, Karin Svensdotter, who worked as a maid, was put on trial at Västra Härad in Sävsjö in Småland. She was put on trial because she claimed that she had a sexual relationship with a male fairy with whom she claimed to have issues, as well as having sexual intercourse with anthropomorphic supernatural beings. Karin Svensdotter told the court that she had met a beautiful man in golden clothes in a mountain called Grönskulle (Green Hill), where they had sung and danced with others. The man called himself Älvakungen (King of the fairies), or Älven (Fairy), and he gave her gifts and had intercourse with her. Seven times she had given birth to their issue, and every time he had come and taken the children away to the land of the fairies. She stated that these births had taken place during her reoccurring attacks and fits, after which she was very tired. Her fits had been witnessed by many, and Karin's employer testified that he had often heard her searching for her faerie children in the forest.

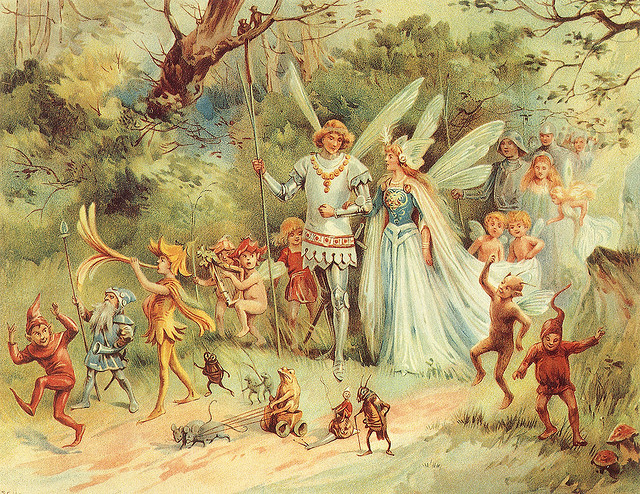
An illustration of the Fairy King and Queen from 1910. Artist unknown.

The case of Karin Svensdotter was unusual and caused much consternation, and there were much debate within the authorities as to how it should be treated. In the 17th century, the existence of mythical creatures of nature such as fairies was acknowledged by the church, who regarded consorting with them as a grave crime. Although there were no specific laws against sexual intercourse with nature-spirits, the authorities usually treated such cases under the law of sodomy, or more specifically bestiality, as the mythical creatures were considered non-human beings and often had animal features on some part of their bodies. According to theologians, such beings were shapes which the Devil and his demons assumed in order to seduce humans. In 1658, a male thief was sentenced to death after having confessed before the court that he had survived his days in the wilderness by his sexual relationship with skogsrået, (a forest-nymph; a mythical female creature of the forest), and as late as 1691, a man, Sven Andersson, was sentenced to death after having confessed to a sexual relationship with a bergrå (a mountain-nymph; a mythical female creature of the mountain). Death sentences by the local courts were common in such cases, but normally, the death sentence was revoked by the higher court. The case of Peder Jönsson, who received a death sentence in 1640 after having confessed to sex with a sjörå (a water-nymph; a mythical female creature of the lake or sea), is one of few such cases where the death sentence was not revoked and an execution is completely confirmed and documented to have taken place. In the case of Karin Svensdotter, Göta hovrätt decided - based on the expert advice of two church chapters - that she had become insane by the magic of Satan, and her congregation was ordered to pray for her recovery. She was given a silver cross by her relatives as protection, and after this, it was reported that the faerie man no longer came to her.

== See also ==
- The Fairy witch trials of Sicily
- Biddy Early
