= Rå =

Figure in Scandinavian folklore

In Scandinavian folklore, a rå (in Swedish) (pl. rår), short for rådare ("ruler") from råda (to rule, to advise) from old Norse ráða, is a spirit who is the keeper or warden of a particular location or landform. The rå is known both in Nordic culture and in the Sami culture, where it is called radie.

It was important for humans to cultivate good relationships with them, since they had power over the natural forces and animals under their care, and could cause both good and bad luck for humans who interfered with the places and creatures under their watch.

== Types of rå ==
The different species of rår are sometimes distinguished according to the different spheres of nature with which each was associated, such as skogsrå or hulder (forest), sjörå (freshwater) or havsrå (saltwater), and bergsrå (mountains).

In accordance with old belief systems, every object, animal, and plant had its own rå or spirit which protected it. A rå could also have jurisdiction over places and items owned by humans, such as skeppsrået (rå of the ship) and gruvrået (rå of the mine).

The term rå refers to a category of guardian spirits associated with specific elements of nature in Scandinavian folklore. These beings were believed to protect their particular domain—such as forests, lakes, or mines—and could be benevolent or dangerous depending on how humans behaved in their territory. According to Scandinavian Folk Belief and Legend, different kinds of rå were recognized across regions: the skogsrå guarded the forest, the sjörå ruled over lakes, and the bergsrå was connected to mountains and mines. Each was thought to have a humanoid appearance but also carried physical signs of their otherworldly nature, like animal tails or hollow backs. These spirits often demanded respect from humans and were known to punish those who exploited nature without proper rituals or reverence.

== The skogsrå ==
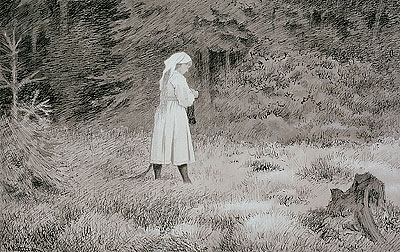
Theodor Kittelsen, Huldra, 1892,

The skogsrå is one of the most well-known forms of rå in Swedish folklore, often described as a beautiful woman who lures men into the forest. She is believed to have a hollow back or a tail, and her encounters often result in the man becoming lost or enchanted. According to Kuusela (2020), the skogsrå played a significant role in forest-related beliefs in Sweden and shares similarities with Finnish spirits like the metsänpeitto. Her portrayal also appears in literary works such as August Strindberg's The Crown Bride, where she symbolizes both untamed nature and repressed female sexuality.

== Gender ==
Though specific individual rår depicted in folklore, such as the skogsrå and the bergsrå, were typically described as female, in general the rår could be both masculine and feminine.

== See also ==
- Animism
- Dryad
- Genius loci
- Kami
- Haltija
- Hiisi
- Tutelary deity
- Vættir, landvættir, for nature spirits and even gods in Norse mythology and religion
