= Peder Jönsson =

Character in Swedish folklore

Peder Jönsson (died 1640), was a Swedish hunter and fisherman from Söderköping, who was executed for having confessed to sexual intercourse with a Sjörå (a lake-nymph; a mythical female creature of the lake). Though there are other cases of the same kind in 17th-century Sweden, his is the only case where the sentence is confirmed to have been executed.

Jönsson was from Söderköping, where he was employed as a sexton at a church. One source says his mother was known locally for being a witch. In 1640, his wife or a neighbour alerted the authorities about him. Before the court, he admitted to previously having together with another man, a Finn, called upon the sjörå three Thursdays in a row with a magic chant "I summon thee Seawife (Haffru) by the names of a thousand devils. I want to serve thee" while beating the water surface three times with a stick made out of rowan tree. This chant they had learnt from an old hunter who had already served the sjörå.

Other sources also says it was a skogsrå, as Jönsson moved in environments where it was said that both could be found, and oftentimes these names would refer to the same mythical being. But in any instance the rå appeared to him as a beautiful woman with horsetail, feet like a cow and legs with fur and dressed in a fine black gown and a white veil on her head. She promised him good fortune in hunting and fishing, and to teach him hydromancy as a way to track down lost or stolen items. In exchange, he would provide her with sex and refuse his wife in bed. He agreed. The wife of Jönsson confirmed his story. This story was interpreted as witchcraft (which would have been considered to be him making a deal with the devil by the authorities), and Peder Jönsson was sentenced to death by the local court (Söderköping town hall court). His sentence was confirmed by the Göta Court of Appeal, and he was thereby executed and then burned at the stake.

== See also ==
- Karin Svensdotter
- Sven Andersson (farmworker)

== Sources ==
- Helmfrid, Björn: Söderköping: Tiden 1568-1690, S:t Ragnhilds Gille, Söderköping (2001), p. 253
