= Peer Gynt =

1867 five-act play in verse by Henrik Ibsen

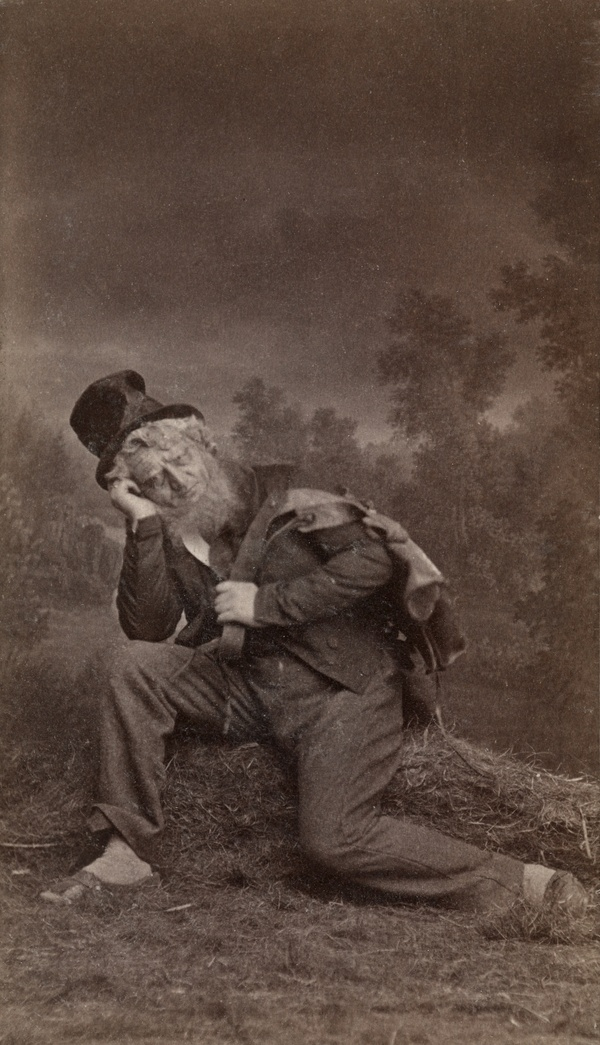
- Henrik Klausen as Peer (1876)
- Original language: Norwegian
- Written by: Henrik Ibsen
- Genre: Romantic dramatic poem converted into a play

Premiere
- Date: 24 February 1876
- Place: Christiania (now Oslo), Norway

Peer Gynt (/pɪər ˈɡɪnt/ peer GHINT, Norwegian: [peːr ˈjʏnt, - ˈɡʏnt]) (Note: While historically more accurate, the pronunciation [ˈjʏnt], with a Norwegian soft G, is now uncommon in Norway.) is a five-act play in verse written in 1867 by the Norwegian dramatist Henrik Ibsen. It is one of Ibsen's best known and most widely performed plays.

Peer Gynt chronicles the journey of its titular character from the Norwegian mountains to the North African desert and back. According to Klaus Van Den Berg, "its origins are Romantic, but the play also anticipates the fragmentations of emerging modernism" and the "cinematic script blends poetry with social satire and realistic scenes with surreal ones." Peer Gynt has also been described as the story of a life based on procrastination and avoidance.

Ibsen wrote Peer Gynt in deliberate disregard of the limitations that the conventional stagecraft of the 19th century imposed on drama. Its forty scenes move uninhibitedly in time and space and between consciousness and the unconscious, blending folkloric fantasy and unsentimental realism. Raymond Williams compares Peer Gynt with August Strindberg's early drama Lucky Peter's Journey (1882) and argues that both explore a new kind of dramatic action that was beyond the capacities of the theatre of the day; both created "a sequence of images in language and visual composition" that "became technically possible only in film."

Ibsen believed Per Gynt, a Norwegian fairy-tale by which the play is loosely inspired, to be rooted in fact. He also wrote that he had used his own family—the intertwined Ibsen/Paus family of Skien—and childhood memories as "some kind of model" for the Gynt family; he acknowledged that the character of Åse—Peer Gynt's mother—was based on his own mother, Marichen Altenburg, while Peer's father Jon Gynt is widely interpreted as based on Ibsen's father Knud Ibsen. He was also generally inspired by Peter Christen Asbjørnsen's collection of Norwegian fairy-tales, Huldre-Eventyr og Folkesagn, published in 1845.

The play was written in Italy, and a first edition of 1,250 copies was published on 14 November 1867 by the Danish publisher Gyldendal in Copenhagen. Although the first edition swiftly sold out, a reprint of two thousand copies, which followed after only fourteen days, did not sell out until seven years later. During Ibsen's lifetime, Denmark and Norway had a largely identical written language based on Danish, but Ibsen wrote Peer Gynt in a somewhat modernized Dano-Norwegian that included a number of distinct Norwegian words.

Peer Gynt was first performed in Christiania (now Oslo) on 24 February 1876, with original music composed by Edvard Grieg that includes some of today's most recognised classical pieces, "In the Hall of the Mountain King" and "Morning Mood". It was published in German translation in 1881, in English in 1892, and in French in 1896. The contemporary influence of the play continues into the twenty-first century; it is widely performed internationally both in traditional and in modern experimental productions.

While Bjørnstjerne Bjørnson admired the play's "satire on Norwegian egotism, narrowness, and self-sufficiency" and described it as "magnificent", Hans Christian Andersen, Georg Brandes and Clemens Petersen all joined the widespread hostility, with Petersen writing that the play was not poetry. Enraged by Petersen's criticisms in particular, Ibsen defended his work by arguing that it "is poetry; and if it isn't, it will become such. The conception of poetry in our country, in Norway, shall shape itself according to this book." Despite this defense of his poetic achievement in Peer Gynt, the play was his last to employ verse; from The League of Youth (1869) onwards, Ibsen was to write drama only in prose.

== Characters ==
- Åse, a peasant's widow
- Peer Gynt, her son and the main character
- Two old women with corn–sacks
- Aslak, a blacksmith
- Wedding guest
- A master cook
- A fiddler
- A man and a wife, newcomers to the district
- Solveig and little Helga, their daughters
- The farmer at Hægstad
- Ingrid, his daughter
- The bridegroom and his parents
- Three alpine dairymaids
- A green-clad woman, a troll princess
- The Dovregubben, a troll king (also known as The Mountain King)
- Multiple troll-courtiers, troll-maidens and troll-urchins
- A couple of witches and troll sorceresses
- Brownies, nixies, gnomes, et al.
- An ugly brat
- The Bøyg, a voice in the darkness and twisting shadow troll
- Kari, a cottar's wife
- Master Cotton
- Monsieur Ballon
- Herr von Eberkopf
- Herr Trumpeterstrale
- Gentlemen on their travels
- A thief
- A receiver
- Anitra, daughter of a Bedouin chief
- Arabs
- Female slaves
- Dancing girls
- The Memnon statue
- The Sphinx at Giza
- Dr. Begriffenfeldt, director of the madhouse at Cairo
- Huhu, a language reformer from the coast of Malabar
- Hussein, an eastern minister
- A fellow with a royal mother
- Several madmen and their keepers
- A Norwegian skipper
- His crew
- A strange passenger
- A pastor/The Devil (Peer thinks he is a pastor)
- A funeral party
- A parish-officer
- A button-moulder
- A lean person/The Devil

== Plot ==
=== Act I ===
Peer Gynt is the son of the once-highly regarded Jon Gynt, who spent all his money on feasting and living lavishly and had to leave his farm to become a wandering salesman, leaving his wife and son behind in debt. Åse, his wife, wished to raise her son to restore the lost fortune of his father, but Peer is soon considered to be useless. He is a poet and a braggart, not unlike the youngest son, the Norwegian fairy-tale character Askeladden, with whom he shares some characteristics.

As the play opens, Peer gives an account of a reindeer hunt that went awry, a famous theatrical scene generally known as "the Buckride". His mother scorns him for his vivid imagination, and taunts him because he spoiled his chances with Ingrid, the daughter of the richest farmer. Peer leaves for Ingrid's wedding, scheduled for the following day, because he may still get a chance with the bride. His mother follows quickly to stop him from shaming himself completely.

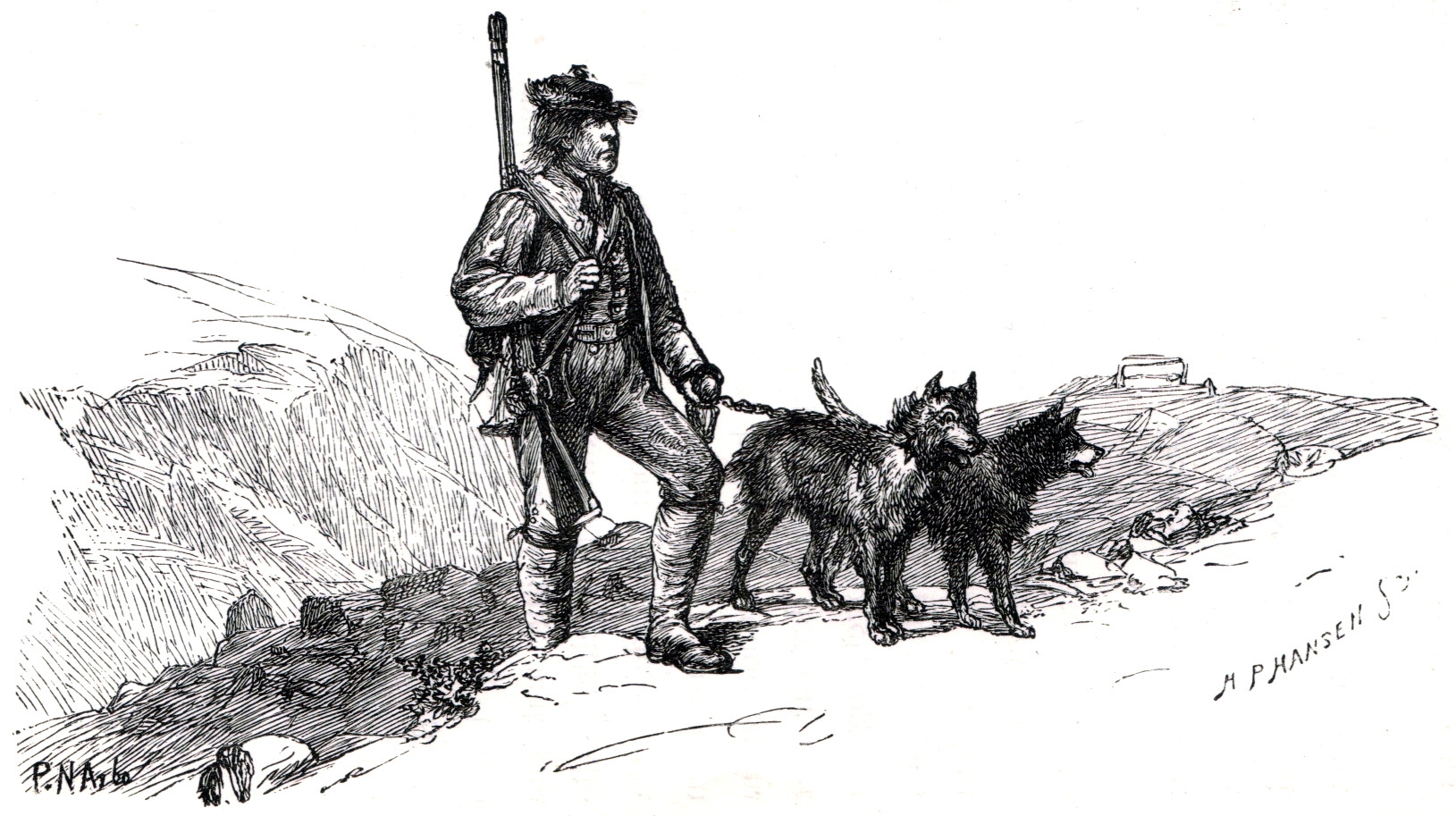
Per Gynt, the hero of the folk-story that Ibsen loosely based Peer Gynt on

At the wedding, the other guests taunt and laugh at Peer, especially the local blacksmith, Aslak, who holds a grudge after an earlier brawl. In the same wedding, Peer meets a family of Haugean newcomers from another valley. He instantly notices the elder daughter, Solveig, and asks her to dance. She refuses because her father would disapprove, and because Peer's reputation has preceded him. She leaves, and Peer starts drinking. When he hears the bride has locked herself in, he seizes the opportunity, runs away with her, and spends the night with her in the mountains.

=== Act II ===
Peer is banished for kidnapping Ingrid. As he wanders the mountains, his mother and Solveig's father search for him. Peer meets three amorous dairymaids who are waiting to be courted by trolls (a folklore motif from Gudbrandsdalen). He becomes highly intoxicated with them and spends the next day alone suffering from a hangover. He runs head-first into a rock and swoons, and the rest of the second act probably takes place in Peer's dreams.

He comes across a woman clad in green, who claims to be the daughter of The Mountain King. Together they ride into the mountain hall, and the troll king gives Peer the opportunity to become a troll if Peer would marry his daughter. Peer agrees to a number of conditions, but declines in the end. He is then confronted with the fact that the green-clad woman has become pregnant. Peer denies this; he claims not to have touched her, but the wise troll king replies that he begat the child in his head. Crucial for the plot and understanding of the play is the question asked by the troll king: "What is the difference between troll and man?"

The answer given by the Old Man of the Mountain is: "Out there, where sky shines, humans say: 'To thyself be true.' In here, trolls say: 'To thyself be enough.'" Egotism is a typical trait of the trolls in this play. From then on, Peer uses this as his motto, always proclaiming that he is himself. He then meets the Bøyg — a creature who has no real description. Asked the question "Who are you?" the Bøyg answers, "Myself". In time, Peer also takes the Bøyg's important saying as a motto: "Go around". For the rest of his life he "beats around the bush" instead of facing himself or the truth.

Upon awaking, Peer is confronted by Helga, Solveig's sister, who gives him food and regards from her sister. Peer gives the girl a silver button for Solveig to keep and asks that she not forget him.

=== Act III ===
As an outlaw, Peer struggles to build his own cottage in the hills. Solveig turns up and insists on living with him. She has made her choice, she says, and there will be no return for her. Peer is delighted and welcomes her, but as she enters the cabin, an old-looking woman in green garments appears with a limping boy at her side.

This is the green-clad woman from the mountain hall, and her half-human brat is the child begotten by Peer from his mind during his stay there. She has cursed Peer by forcing him to remember her and all his previous sins, when facing Solveig. Peer hears a ghostly voice saying "Go roundabout, Peer", and decides to leave. He tells Solveig he has something heavy to fetch. He returns in time for his mother's death, and then sets off overseas.

=== Act IV ===
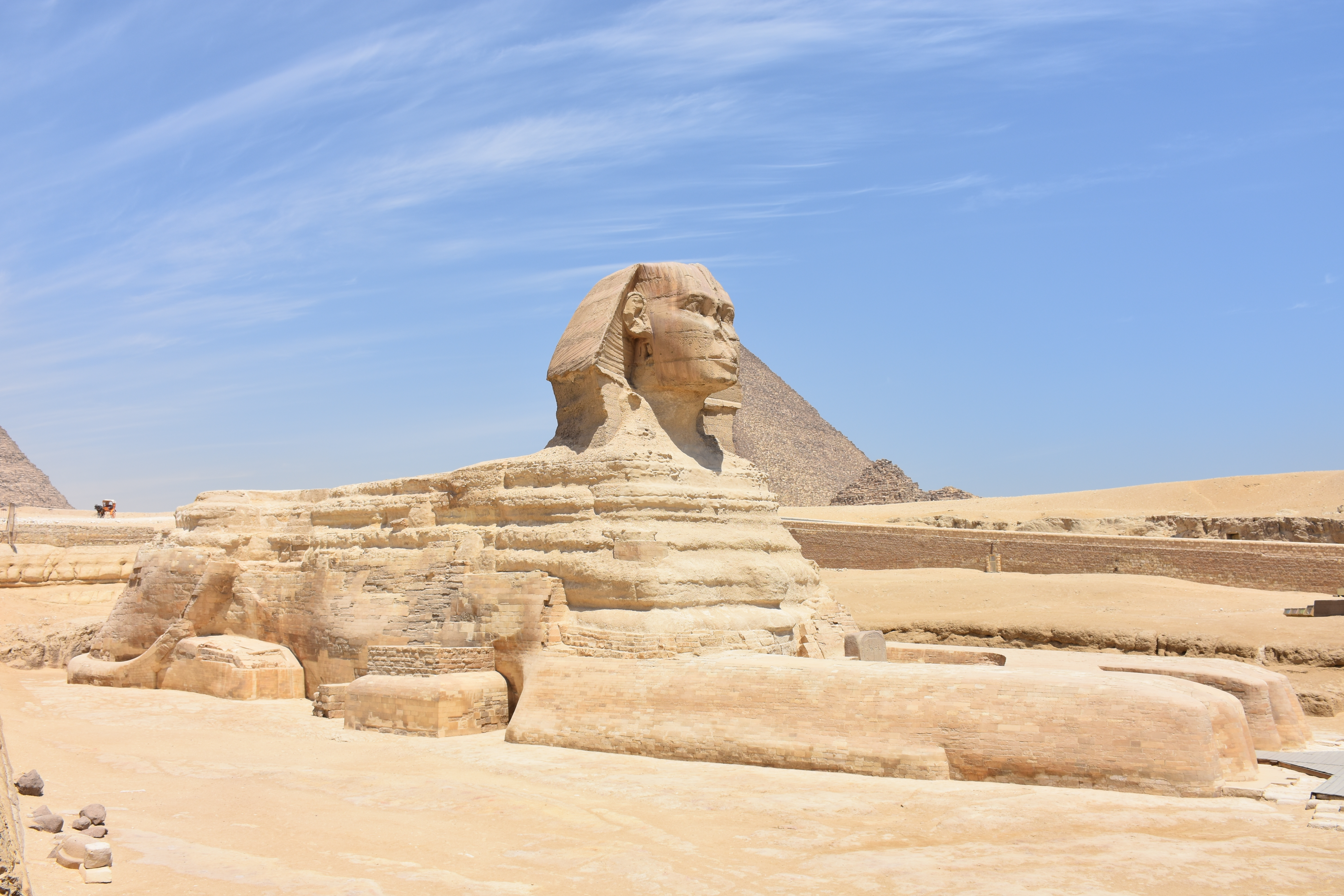
The Sphinx

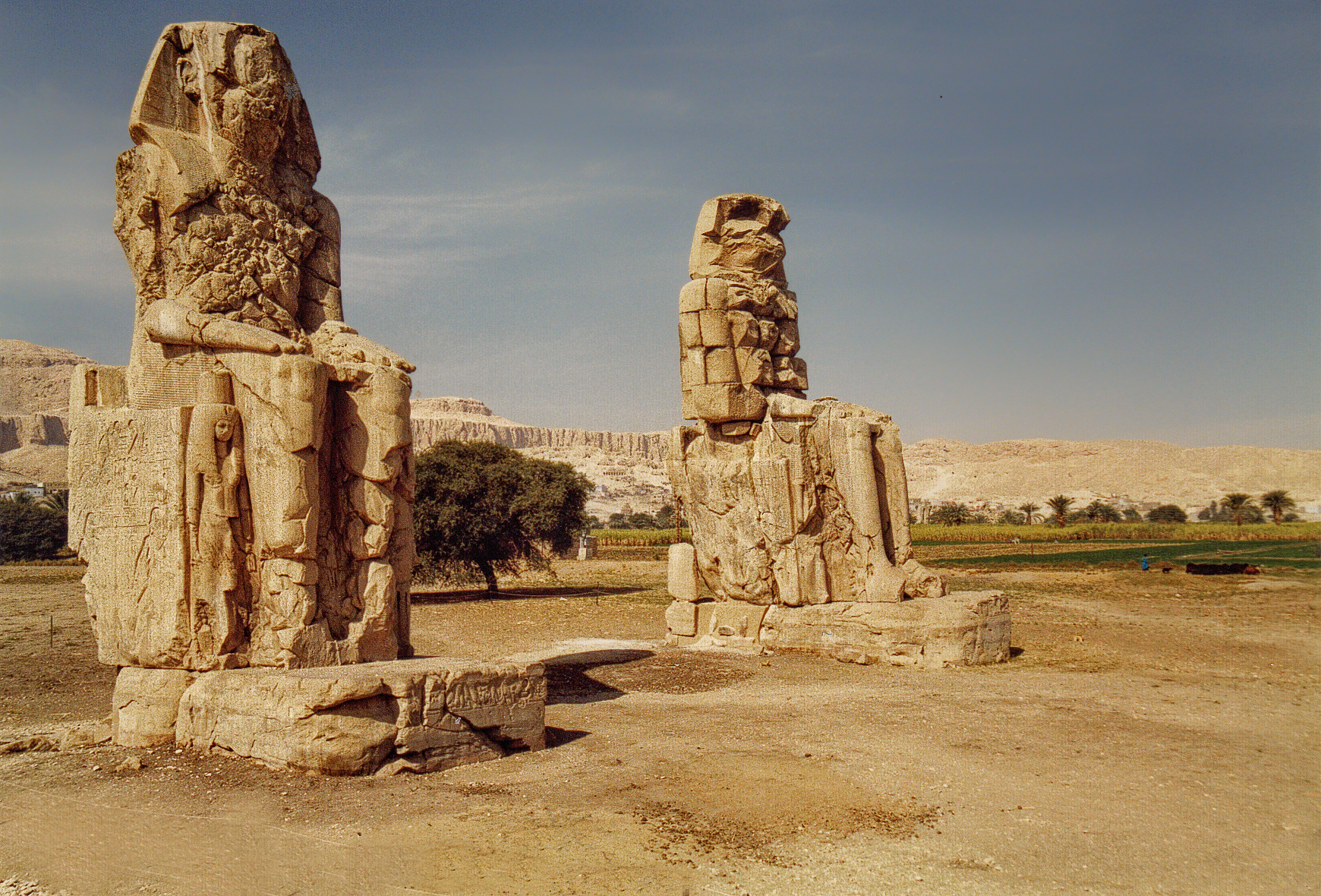
Colossi of Memnon

Peer is away for many years, taking part in various occupations and playing various roles, including that of a businessman engaged in enterprises on the coast of Morocco. Here, he explains his view of life, and we learn that he is a businessman taking part in unethical transactions, including sending heathen images to China and trading slaves. In his defense, he points out that he has also sent missionaries to China, and he treated his slaves well.

His companions rob him, after he decides to support the Turks in suppressing a Greek revolt, and leave him alone on the shore. He then finds some stolen Bedouin gear, and, in these clothes, he is hailed as a prophet by a local tribe. He tries to seduce Anitra, the chieftain's daughter, but she steals his money and rings, gets away, and leaves him.

Then he decides to become a historian and travels to Egypt. He wanders through the desert, passing the Colossi of Memnon and the Sphinx. As he addresses the Sphinx, believing it to be the Bøyg, he encounters the keeper of the local madhouse, himself insane, who regards Peer as the bringer of supreme wisdom. Peer comes to the madhouse and understands that all of the patients live in their own worlds, being themselves to such a degree that no one cares for anyone else. In his youth, Peer had dreamt of becoming an emperor. In this place, he is finally hailed as one — the emperor of the "self". Peer despairs and calls for the "Keeper of all fools", i.e., God.

=== Act V ===
Finally, on his way home as an old man, he is shipwrecked. Among those on board, he meets the Strange Passenger, who wants to make use of Peer's corpse to find out where dreams have their origin. This passenger scares Peer out of his wits. Peer lands on shore bereft of all of his possessions, a pitiful and grumpy old man.

Back home in Norway, Peer attends a peasant funeral and an auction, where he offers for sale everything from his earlier life. The auction takes place at the very farm where the wedding once was held. Peer stumbles along and is confronted with all that he did not do, his unsung songs, his unmade works, his unwept tears, and his questions that were never asked. His mother comes back and claims that her deathbed went awry; he did not lead her to heaven with his ramblings.

Peer escapes and is confronted with the Button-molder, a servant sent by God, who maintains that Peer's soul must be melted down with other faulty goods unless he can explain when and where in life he has been "himself". Peer protests. He has been only that, and nothing else. Then he meets the troll king, who states that Peer has been a troll, not a man, most of his life.

The Button-molder says that he has to come up with something if he is not to be melted down. Peer looks for a priest to whom to confess his sins, and a character named "The Lean One" (who is the Devil) turns up. The Lean One believes Peer cannot be counted a real sinner who can be sent to Hell; he has committed no grave sin.

Peer despairs in the end, understanding that his life is forfeit; he is nothing. But at the same moment, Solveig starts to sing—the cabin Peer built is close at hand, but he dares not enter. The Bøyg in Peer tells him "go around". The Button-molder shows up and demands a list of sins, but Peer has none to give, unless Solveig can vouch for him. Then Peer breaks through to Solveig, asking her to forgive his sins. But she answers: "You have not sinned at all, my dearest boy."

Peer does not understand—he believes himself lost. Then he asks her: "Where has Peer Gynt been since we last met? Where was I as the one I should have been, whole and true, with the mark of God on my brow?" She answers: "In my faith, in my hope, in my love." Peer screams, calls for his mother, and hides himself in her lap. Solveig sings her lullaby for him. Behind the corner, the Button-molder still lingering, with the words: "Peer, we shall meet at the last crossroads, and then we shall see if... I'll say no more."

While some interpretations presumes that he dies in this last scene of the play, there are neither stage directions nor dialogue to indicate that he actually does. The ending is intentionally kept wide open for multiple outcomes.

== Analysis ==
Klaus van den Berg argues that Peer Gynt

... is a stylistic minefield: Its origins are romantic, but the play also anticipates the fragmentations of emerging Modernism. Chronicling Peer's journey from the Norwegian mountains to the North African desert, the cinematic script blends poetry with social satire, and realistic scenes with surreal ones. The irony of isolated individuals in a mass society infuses Ibsen's tale of two seemingly incompatible lovers – the deeply committed Solveig and the superficial Peer, who is more a surface for projections than a coherent character. The simplest conclusion one may draw from Peer Gynt, is expressed in the eloquent prose of the author: "If you lie; are you real?"

The literary critic Harold Bloom in his book The Western Canon has challenged the conventional reading of Peer Gynt, stating:

Far more than Goethe's Faust, Peer is the one nineteenth-century literary character who has the largeness of the grandest characters of Renaissance imaginings. Dickens, Tolstoy, Stendhal, Hugo, even Balzac have no single figure quite so exuberant, outrageous, vitalistic as Peer Gynt. He merely seems initially to be an unlikely candidate for such eminence: What is he, we say, except a kind of Norwegian roaring boy? – marvelously attractive to women, a kind of bogus poet, a narcissist, absurd self-idolator, a liar, seducer, bombastic self-deceiver. But this is paltry moralizing – all too much like the scholarly chorus that rants against Falstaff. True, Peer, unlike Falstaff, is not a great wit. But in the Yahwistic, biblical sense, Peer the scamp bears the blessing: More life.

== Writing process ==
On 5 January 1867 Ibsen wrote to Frederik Hegel, his publisher, with his plan for the play: it would be "a long dramatic poem, having as its principal a part-legendary, part-fictional character from Norwegian folklore during recent times. It will bear no resemblance to Brand, and will contain no direct polemics or anything of that kind."

He began to write Peer Gynt on 14 January, employing a far greater variety of metres in its rhymed verse than he had used in his previous verse plays Brand (written 1865) or Love's Comedy (written 1862). The first two acts were completed in Rome and the third in Casamicciola on the north of the island of Ischia.

During this time, Ibsen told Vilhelm Bergsøe that "I don't think the play's for acting" when they discussed the possibility of staging the play's image of a casting-ladle "big enough to re-cast human beings in." Ibsen sent the three acts to his publisher on 8 August, with a letter that explains that "Peer Gynt was a real person who lived in Gudbrandsdal, probably around the end of the last century or the beginning of this. His name is still famous among the people up there, but not much more is known about his life than what is to be found in Asbjørnsen's Norwegian Folktales (in the section entitled 'Stories from the Mountain')." In those stories, Peer Gynt rescues the three dairy-maids from the trolls and shoots the Bøyg, who was originally a gigantic worm-shaped troll-being. Peer was known to tell tall tales of his own achievements, a trait Peer in the play inherited. The "buck-ride" story, which Peer tells his mother in the play's first scene, is also from this source, but, as Åse points out, it was originally Gudbrand Glesne from Vågå who did the tour with the reindeer stag and finally shot it.

Following an earthquake on Ischia on 14 August, Ibsen left for Sorrento, where he completed the final two acts; he finished the play on 14 October. It was published in a first edition of 1,250 copies a month later in Copenhagen.

== Background ==
Ibsen's previous play, Brand, preached the philosophy of "All or nothing." Relentless, cruel, resolute, overriding in will, Brand went through everything that stood in his way toward gaining an ideal. Peer Gynt is a compensating balance, a complementary color to Brand. In contrast to Brand, with his iron will, Peer is willless, insufficient, and irresolute. Peer "goes around" all issues facing him.

Brand had a phenomenal literary success, and people became curious to know what Ibsen's next play would be. The dramatist, about this time, was relieved of financial worry by two money grants, one from the Norwegian government and the other from the Scientific Society of Trondhjem. This enabled him to give to his work an unfettered mind. He went with his family to Frascati, where, in the Palazzo rooms, he looked many feet down upon the Mediterranean, and pondered his new drama. He preserved a profound silence about the content of the play, and begged his publisher, Hegel, to create as much mystery about it as possible.

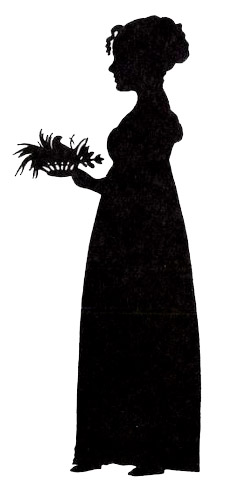
Ibsen's mother, Marichen Altenburg, was the model for Peer Gynt's mother, Åse

The portrayal of the Gynt family is known to be based on Henrik Ibsen's own family—the intertwined Ibsen/Paus family of Skien—and childhood memories; in a letter to Georg Brandes, Ibsen wrote that his own family and childhood had served "as some kind of model" for the Gynt family. In a letter to Peter Hansen, Ibsen confirmed that the character Åse, Peer Gynt's mother, was based on his own mother, Marichen Altenburg. The character Jon Gynt is considered to be based on Ibsen's father Knud Ibsen, who was a rich merchant before he went bankrupt. Even the name of the Gynt family's ancestor, the prosperous Rasmus Gynt, is borrowed from the Ibsen's family's earliest known ancestor. Thus, the character Peer Gynt could be interpreted as being an ironic representation of Henrik Ibsen himself. There are striking similarities to Ibsen's own life; Ibsen himself spent 27 years living abroad and was never able to face his hometown again.

== Grieg's music ==
Ibsen asked Edvard Grieg to compose incidental music for the play. Grieg composed a score that plays approximately ninety minutes. Grieg extracted two suites of four pieces each from the incidental music (Opus 46 and Opus 55), which became very popular as concert music. One of the sung parts of the incidental music, "In the Hall of the Mountain King", was included in the first suite with the vocal parts omitted. Originally, the second suite had a fifth number, "The Dance of the Mountain King's Daughter", but Grieg withdrew it. Grieg himself declared that it was easier to make music "out of his own head" than strictly following suggestions made by Ibsen. For instance, Ibsen wanted music that would characterize the "international" friends in the fourth act, by melding the said national anthems (Norwegian, Swedish, German, French and English). Reportedly, Grieg was not in the right mood for this task.

The music of these suites, especially "Morning Mood" starting the first suite, "In the Hall of the Mountain King", and the string lament "Åse's Death" later reappeared in numerous arrangements, soundtracks, etc.

Other Norwegian composers who have written theatrical music for Peer Gynt include Harald Sæverud (1947), Arne Nordheim (1969), Ketil Hvoslef (1993) and Jon Mostad (1993–4). Gunnar Sønstevold (1966) wrote music for a ballet version of Peer Gynt.

== Notable productions ==
In 1906, scenes from the play were given by the Progressive Stage Society of New York. The first US production of Peer Gynt opened at the Chicago Grand Opera House on October 24, 1906, and starred the noted actor Richard Mansfield, in one of his very last roles before his untimely death. In 1923, Joseph Schildkraut played the role on Broadway, in a Theatre Guild production, featuring Selena Royle, Helen Westley, Dudley Digges, and, before he entered films, Edward G. Robinson. In 1944, at the Old Vic, Ralph Richardson played the role, surrounded by some of the greatest British actors of the time in supporting or bit roles, among them Sybil Thorndike as Åse, and Laurence Olivier as the Button Molder. In 1951, John Garfield fulfilled his wish to star in a Broadway production, featuring Mildred Dunnock as Åse. This production was not a success, and is said by some to have contributed to Garfield's death at age 39.

On film, years before he became a superstar, the seventeen-year-old Charlton Heston starred as Peer in a silent, student-made, low-budget film version of the play produced in 1941. Peer Gynt, however, has never been given a full-blown treatment as a sound film in English on the motion picture screen, although there have been several television productions, and a sound film was produced in German in 1934.

In 1957, Ingmar Bergman produced a five-hour stage version of Peer Gynt, at Sweden's Malmö City Theatre, with Max von Sydow as Peer Gynt. Bergman produced the play again, 34 years later, in 1991, at Sweden's Royal Dramatic Theatre, this time with Börje Ahlstedt in the title role. Bergman chose not to use Grieg's music, nor the more modern Harald Sæverud composition, but rather traditional Norwegian folk music, and little of that either.

In 1993, Christopher Plummer starred in his own concert version of the play, with the Hartford Symphony Orchestra in Hartford, Connecticut. This was a new performing version and a collaboration of Plummer and Hartford Symphony Orchestra Music Director Michael Lankester. Plummer had long dreamed of starring in a fully staged production of the play, but had been unable to. The 1993 production was not a fully staged version, but rather a drastically condensed concert version, narrated by Plummer, who also played the title role, and accompanied by Edvard Grieg's complete incidental music for the play. This version included a choir and vocal parts for soprano and mezzo-soprano. Plummer performed the concert version again in 1995 with the Toronto Symphony Orchestra with Lankester conducting. The 1995 production was broadcast on Canadian radio. It has never been presented on television nor released on compact disc. In the 1990s Plummer and Lankester also collaborated on and performed similarly staged concert versions of A Midsummer Night's Dream by William Shakespeare (with music by Mendelssohn) and Ivan the Terrible (an arrangement of a Prokofiev film score with script for narrator). Among the three aforementioned Plummer/Lankester collaborations, all received live concert presentations and live radio broadcasts, but only Ivan the Terrible was released on CD.

Alex Jennings won the Olivier Award for Best Actor 1995/1996 for his performance in the Royal Shakespeare Company's production of Peer Gynt.

In 1999, Braham Murray directed a production at the Royal Exchange Theatre in Manchester with David Threlfall as Peer Gynt, Josette Bushell-Mingo as Solveig and Espen Skjønberg as Button Moulder.

In 2000, the Royal National Theatre staged a version based on the 1990 translation of the play by Frank McGuinness. The production featured three actors playing Peer, including Chiwetel Ejiofor as the young Peer, Patrick O'Kane as Peer in his adventures in Africa, and Joseph Marcell as the old Peer. Not only was the use of three actors playing one character unusual in itself, but the actors were part of a "color-blind" cast: Ejiofor and Marcell are black, and O'Kane is white.

In 2001, at the BBC Proms, the Gothenburg Symphony Orchestra and BBC Singers, conducted by Manfred Honeck, performed the complete incidental music in Norwegian with an English narration read by Simon Callow.

In 2005, Chicago's storefront theater The Artistic Home mounted an acclaimed production (directed by Kathy Scambiatterra and written by Norman Ginsbury) that received two Jeff Nominations for its dynamic staging in a 28-seat house. The role of Peer was played by a single actor, John Mossman.

In 2006, Robert Wilson staged a co-production revival with both the National Theater of Bergen and the Norwegian Theatre of Oslo, Norway. Ann-Christin Rommen directed the actors in Norwegian (with English subtitles). This production mixed both Wilson's minimalist (yet constantly moving) stage designs with technological effects to bring out the play's expansive potential. Furthermore, they utilized state-of-the-art microphones, sound systems, and recorded acoustic and electronic music to bring clarity to the complex and shifting action and dialogue. From April 11 through the 16th, they performed at the Brooklyn Academy of Music's Howard Gilman Opera House.

In 2006, as part of the Norwegian Ibsen anniversary festival, Peer Gynt was set at the foot of the Great Sphinx of Giza near Cairo, Egypt (an important location in the original play). The director was Bentein Baardson. The performance was the centre of some controversy, with some critics seeing it as a display of colonialist attitudes.

In January 2008, the Guthrie Theater in Minneapolis debuted a new translation of Peer Gynt by the poet Robert Bly. Bly learned Norwegian from his grandparents while growing up in rural Minnesota, and later during several years of travel in Norway. This production stages Ibsen's text rather abstractly, tying it loosely into a modern birthday party for a 50-year-old man. It also significantly cuts the length of the play. (An earlier production of the full-length play at the Guthrie required the audience to return a second night to see the second half of the play.)

In 2009, Dundee Rep with the National Theatre of Scotland toured a production. This interpretation, with much of the dialogue in modern Scots, received mixed reviews. The cast included Gerry Mulgrew as the older Peer. Directed by Dominic Hill.

In November 2010, Southampton Philharmonic Choir and the New London Sinfonia performed the complete incidental music using a new English translation commissioned from Beryl Foster. In the performance, the musical elements were linked by an English narrative read by actor Samuel West.

From June 28 through July 24, 2011, La Jolla Playhouse ran a production of Peer Gynt as a co-production with the Kansas City Repertory Theatre, adapted and directed by David Schweizer.

The 2011 Dublin Theatre Festival presented a new version of Peer Gynt by Arthur Riordan, directed by Lynne Parker with music by Tarab.

== The Peer Gynt Festival ==
At Vinstra in Gudbrandsdalen (the Gudbrand valley), Henrik Ibsen and Peer Gynt have been celebrated with an annual festival since 1967. The festival is one of Norway's largest cultural festivals, and is recognized by the Norwegian Government as a leading institution of presenting culture in nature. The festival has a broad festival program with theatre, concerts, an art exhibition and several debates and literature seminars.

The main event in the festival is the outdoor theatre production of Peer Gynt at Gålå. The play is staged in Peer Gynt's birthplace, where Ibsen claims he found inspiration for the character Peer Gynt, and is regarded by many as the most authentic version. The play is performed by professional actors from the national theater institutions, and nearly 80 local amateur actors. The music to the play is inspired by the original theatre music by Edvard Grieg – the "Peer Gynt suite". The play is one of the most popular theater productions in Norway, attracting more than 12,000 people every summer.

The festival also holds the Peer Gynt Prize, which is a national Norwegian honor prize given to a person or institution that has achieved distinction in society and contributed to improving Norway's international reputation.

== Peer Gynt Sculpture Park ==
Peer Gynt Sculpture Park (Peer Gynt-parken) is a sculpture park located in Oslo, Norway. Created in honour of Henrik Ibsen, it is a monumental presentation of Peer Gynt, scene by scene. It was established in 2006 by Selvaag, the company behind the housing development in the area. Most of the sculptures in this park are the result of an international sculpture competition.

== Adaptations ==
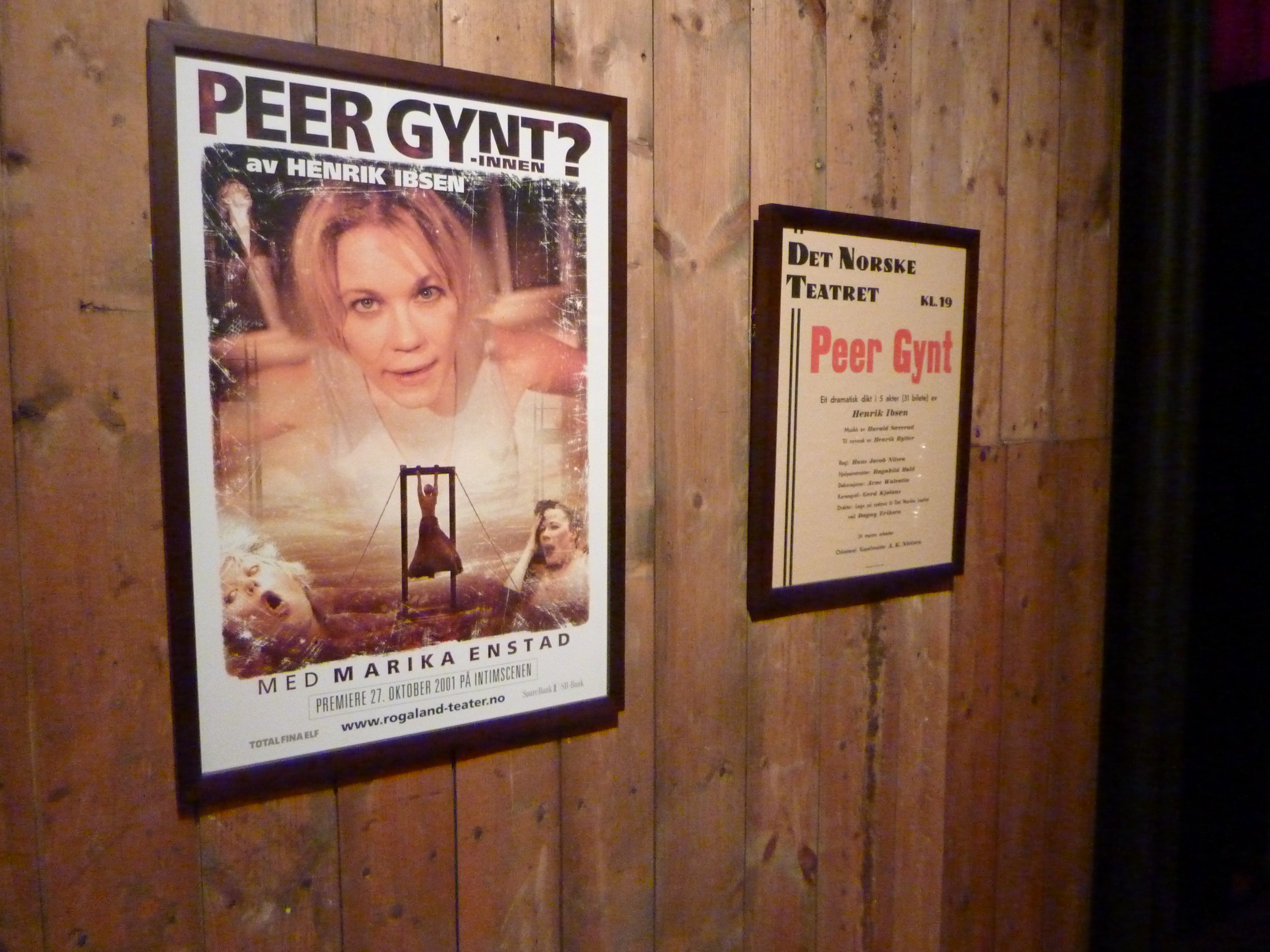
Theatre posters for Peer Gynt and an adaptation entitled Peer Gynt-innen? in Ibsen Museum, Oslo

In 1912, German writer Dietrich Eckart adapted the play. In Eckart's version, the play became "a powerful dramatisation of nationalist and anti-semitic ideas", in which Gynt represents the superior Germanic hero, struggling against implicitly Jewish "trolls". In this racial allegory the trolls and Great Bøyg represented what philosopher Otto Weininger – Eckart's hero – conceived as the Jewish spirit. Eckart's version was one of the best attended productions of the age with more than 600 performances in Berlin alone. Eckart later helped to found the Nazi Party and served as a mentor to Adolf Hitler; he was also the first editor of the party's newspaper, the Völkische Beobachter. He never had another theatrical success after Peer Gynt.

In 1938, German composer Werner Egk finished an opera based on the story.

In 1948, the composer Harald Sæverud made a new score for the nynorsk-production at "the Norwegian Theatre" (Det Norske Teatret) in Oslo. Sæverud incorporated the national music of each of the friends in the fourth act, as per Ibsen's request, who died in 1906.

In 1951, North Carolinian playwright Paul Green published an American version of the Norwegian play. This is the version in which John Garfield starred on Broadway. This version is also the American Version, and features subtle plot differences from Ibsen's original work, including the omittance of the shipwreck scene near the end, and the Buttonmolder character playing a moderately larger role.

In 1961, Hugh Leonard's version, The Passion of Peter Ginty, transferred the play to an Irish Civil War setting. It was staged at Dublin's Gate Theatre.

In 1969, Broadway impresario Jacques Levy (who had previously directed the first version of Oh! Calcutta!) commissioned The Byrds' Roger McGuinn to write the music for a pop (or country-rock) version of Peer Gynt, to be titled Gene Tryp. The play was apparently never completed, although, as of 2006, McGuinn was preparing a version for release. Several songs from the abortive show appeared on the Byrds' albums of 1970 and 1971.

In March 1972 Jerry Heymann's adaptation, called Mr. Gynt, Inc., was performed at La MaMa Experimental Theatre Club.

In 1981, Houston Ballet presented Peer Gynt as adapted by Artistic Director Ben Stevenson, OBE.

In 1989, John Neumeier created a ballet "freely based on Ibsen's play", for which Alfred Schnittke composed the score.

In 1998, the Trinity Repertory Company of Providence, Rhode Island commissioned David Henry Hwang and Swiss director Stephan Muller to do an adaptation of Peer Gynt.

In 1998, playwright Romulus Linney directed his adaptation of the play, entitled Gint, at the Theatre for the New City in New York. This adaptation moved the play's action to 20th-century Appalachia and California.

In 2001, Rogaland Theatre produced an adaptation titled Peer Gynt-innen?, loosely translated as "Peer the Gyntess?". This was a one-act monologue performed by Marika Enstad.

In 2007, St. John's Prep of Danvers, Massachusetts, won the MHSDG Festival with their production starring Bo Burnham.

In 2008, Theater in the Open in Newburyport, Massachusetts, produced a production of Peer Gynt adapted and directed by Paul Wann and the company. Scott Smith, whose great-great-grandfather (Ole Bull) was one of the inspirations for the character, was cast as Gynt.

In 2009, a DVD was released of Heinz Spoerli's ballet, which he had created in 2007. This ballet uses mostly the Grieg music, but adds selections by other composers. Spoken excerpts from the play, in Norwegian, are also included.

In Israel, poet Dafna Eilat (he:דפנה אילת) composed a poem in Hebrew titled "Solveig", which she also set to music, its theme derived from the play and emphasizing the named character's boundless faithful love. It was performed by Hava Alberstein (see).

In 2011, Polarity Ensemble Theatre in Chicago presented another version of Robert Bly's translation of the play, in which Peer's mythic journey was envisioned as that of America itself, "a 150-year whirlwind tour of the American psyche."

On an episode of Inside the Actors Studio, Elton John spontaneously composed a song based on a passage from Peer Gynt.

The German a cappella metal band Van Canto also made a theatrical adaptation of the story, naming it Peer Returns. The first episode that has been released called "A Storm to Come", appears on the band's album Break the Silence.

American composer Mary McCarty Snow (1928–2012) composed music for a Texas Tech University production of Peer Gynt.

Will Eno's adaptation of Ibsen's Peer Gynt, titled Gnit, had its world premiere at the 37th Humana Festival of New American Plays in March 2013.

In 2020, a new audio drama adaptation of Peer Gynt by Colin Macnee, written in verse form with original music, was released in podcast form.

In 2025, Vegard Vinge, Ida Müller, and Trond Reinholdtsen bring a new adaptation of Peer Gynt at the Volksbühne am Rosa-Luxemburg-Platz for 6 shows of 8 hours each.

=== Film and television ===
There have been a number of film adaptations including:

- Peer Gynt (1915 film), an American film directed by Oscar Apfel and Raoul Walsh
- Peer Gynt (1919 film), a German film directed by Richard Oswald
- Peer Gynt (1934 film), a German film directed by Fritz Wendhausen
- Peer Gynt (1941 film), notable for being the film debut of Charlton Heston
- Peer Gynt (1971 film), a German language TV film starring Edith Clever
- Peer Gynt (1972 television episode), a BBC TV Play of the Month starring Colin Blakely, translated by Norman Ginsbury
- Peer Gynt (1979 animated film), Russian animation studio Soyuzmultfilm animated film "Пер Гюнт".
- Peer Gynt (1981 film), a French TV film directed by Bernard Sobel
- Peer Gynt (1988 film), a Hungarian TV film directed by István Gaál
- Peer Gynt (2006 film), a German TV film directed by Uwe Janson
- Peer Gynt (2017 film), a Belgian short film directed by Michiel Robberecht

== See also ==
- Per Gynt
- Henrik Ibsen
- Troll
- Bergsrå
- Oread
- Bøyg
- Askeladden
- Stallo
- Witchcraft
- The Devil
- Norwegian Folktales
- Giant

== Sources ==
- Banham, Martin, ed. 1998. The Cambridge Guide to Theatre. Cambridge: Cambridge University Press. ISBN 0-521-43437-8.
- Brockett, Oscar G. & Franklin J. Hildy. 2003. History of the Theatre. 9th international edition. Boston, MA: Allyn & Bacon. ISBN 0-205-41050-2.
- Farquharson Sharp, R., trans. 1936. Peer Gynt: A Dramatic Poem. Henrik Ibsen. Edinburgh: J.M. Dent & Sons / Philadelphia, PA: J.B. Lippincott. Available in online edition.
- McLeish, Kenneth, trans. 1990. Peer Gynt. Henrik Ibsen. Drama Classics ser. London: Nick Hern, 1999. ISBN 1-85459-435-4.
- Meyer, Michael, trans. 1963. Peer Gynt. Henrik Ibsen. In Plays: Six. World Classics ser. London: Methuen, 1987. 29–186. ISBN 0-413-15300-2.
- –––. 1974. Ibsen: A Biography. Abridged. Pelican Biographies ser. Harmondsworth: Penguin. ISBN 0-14-021772-X.
- Moi, Toril. 2006. Henrik Ibsen and the Birth of Modernism: Art, Theater, Philosophy. Oxford / New York: Oxford University Press. ISBN 978-0-19-920259-1.
- Oelmann, Klaus Henning. 1993. Edvard Grieg: Versuch einer Orientierung. Egelsbach Cologne New York: Verlag Händel-Hohenhausen. ISBN 3-89349-485-5.
- Schumacher, Meinolf. 2009. "Peer Gynts letzte Nacht: Eschatologische Medialität und Zeitdehnung bei Henrik Ibsen". Figuren der Ordnung: Beiträge zu Theorie und Geschichte literarischer Dispositionsmuster. Ed. Susanne Gramatzki and Rüdiger Zymner. Cologne: Böhlau. pp. 147–162. ISBN 978-3-412-20355-9 Available in online edition.
- Watts, Peter, trans. 1966. Peer Gynt: A Dramatic Poem. By Henrik Ibsen. Harmondsworth: Penguin. ISBN 0-14-044167-0.
- Williams, Raymond. 1966. Modern Tragedy. London: Chatto & Windus. ISBN 0-7011-1260-3.
- –––. 1989. The Politics of Modernism: Against the New Conformists. Ed. Tony Pinkney. London and New York: Verso. ISBN 0-86091-955-2.
- –––. 1993. Drama from Ibsen to Brecht. London: Hogarth. ISBN 0-7012-0793-0.
