= Tithorea (mythology) =

In Greek mythology, Tithorea (Ancient Greek: Τιθορέα) a Phocian nymph of Mount Parnassus, from whom the town of Tithorea, previously called Neon, was believed to have derived its name. She was possibly a dryad.
