= Unforgiving: A Northern Hymn =

2017 video game

- Developer: Angry Demon Studio
- Publisher: Angry Demon Studio
- Designer: John Kalderon
- Programmer: Carl Pettersson
- Artists: John Kalderon; Victor Jonsson; Caroline Petri
- Writer: Paulina Miszczuk
- Platform: Windows
- Release: November 27, 2017
- Genre: Survival horror
- Mode: Single-player

Unforgiving: A Northern Hymn is a survival horror game from Swedish-based independent game company; Angry Demon Studio. The game is in Swedish with English subtitles and is heavily inspired by Swedish folklore and Norse mythology.

It was released on Windows on November 27, 2017.

== Gameplay ==
The gameplay is open world and survival horror from a first-person perspective. The setting is a forest and the player is also given a chance to explore various cabins, abandoned buildings, and an abandoned mine shaft. The game is also dimly-lit obscuring potential threats from the player's vision and uses sound to manipulate the player into questioning the presence of enemies. The game also features an AI that chooses its own paths instead of repeating the same path to increase the game's unpredictability.

== Plot ==
=== Introduction ===
The game begins with protagonist Linn waking up tied in the back of her brother Lukas' car. After kicking Lukas in the back of the head in order to escape, Lukas crashes, leaving both lost in the woods and working together to seek a means of escape.

Shortly after the car crash, Linn learns the reason Lukas kidnapped her. He explains he was simply trying to help her with her addiction, which she had refused to seek treatment for. He planned to take her to a cabin to help her begin to recover.

=== River ===
Linn and Lukas soon get separated while crossing a river. Linn then crosses a swamp area, fixing a fuse box and outrunning a specter in the process. Once the fuse box is repaired, she crosses the river on a tram car and is re-united with her brother, after evading a one-armed troll. After being reunited, the brother and the sister are spotted by the troll and forced to flee; Lukas is caught under rubble and Linn is forced to kill him. Linn is left alone and without a flashlight, meaning that she now must rely on light from matchsticks found in matchboxes throughout the game.

After leaving her brother, Linn comes across a village of abandoned houses, where she finds her first matchbox. After picking up her first matchbox, the phone rings in the house and an unknown voice who addresses a message to someone named "Ragnar" tells her to go "toward the light" to a mine over the lake, and that she must cross the lake by playing a song to tell a guardian at the lake to send a boat. While in the village, Linn also encounters what appear to be humanoid figures trapped inside of trees. After she leaves the house, Linn then hears a disembodied whisper that asks her to find Freyja's golden harp in order to call the boat.

=== Harp ===
She soon finds the harp inside another abandoned building in the village, called the Hall of the Harp. Inside the Hall of the Harp, Linn finds Freyja's harp placed upon an altar, but is met with a disembodied voice telling the player that an offering of fire and an offering of blood must be placed on the altar before the harp can be taken. After making these offerings, Linn is able to take the harp, which allows her to play it in order to complete tasks such as opening doorways.

After the player leaves the Hall of the Harp, Linn outruns the figure of a Skogsrå who screams and sprints after her. She then places the harp on an outdoor altar, and a disembodied voice tells her that she must place an offering of one eye and an offering of one tongue on this altar. She obtains the eye and the tongue from her brother's corpse, and then completes the ritual, allowing her to play longer songs with the Harp. Linn then plays the harp on the bridge, intending to call upon the guardian to bring the boat. However, the Skogsrå appears again and bites her. Tendrils then begin to form on her arm, implying that the bite has caused her to begin slowly transforming into one of the humanoid tree-spirits. The boat then appears, and while on the boat trip across the lake, Linn sees the Näcken playing his violin on the shore. He speaks, and tempts her by saying he can relieve her pain if she gives him Freyja's harp. The boat does not stop, and she continues sailing past as the Näcken hysterically laughs.

=== Troll ===
On the other side of the lake, Linn once again encounters the one-armed troll. She progresses by playing the harp in a manner corresponding to notes scattered around the area, all while evading the troll, before then escaping by running into an abandoned mine shaft. Within the mine, she is forced to set light to a tree spirit that resembles a mother and child that is blocking the way forward, even as the mother voice begs for her not to do it.

After evading an area containing trolls, Linn enters an isolated area on a cliff-side with scattered reminders of her addiction, including needles, bottles of morphine, and pills. A disembodied voice encourages her to jump, and she does so, finding herself in a nightmare-like space that is pitch black with walls covered in large red eyes. Here, the Näcken reappears and again offers the exchange of the harp for the relief of her pain. Linn assents, handing him the harp. The Näcken removes Linn's bite as promised, but says that she now must find her way out. Linn then runs towards a light while avoiding being crushed by giant hands that appear from the walls.

=== Conclusion ===
Once she reaches the light, she reappears in the back of her brother's car. The disembodied voice of the Näcken then explains that he has the protagonist trapped in an endless loop, because he enjoys watching her suffer over and over again. As his voice fades, Linn begins to forget the previous loop, and begins kicking her brother in the back of the head while he's driving, beginning the cycle anew.
