= Per Gynt =

Norwegian fairy tale

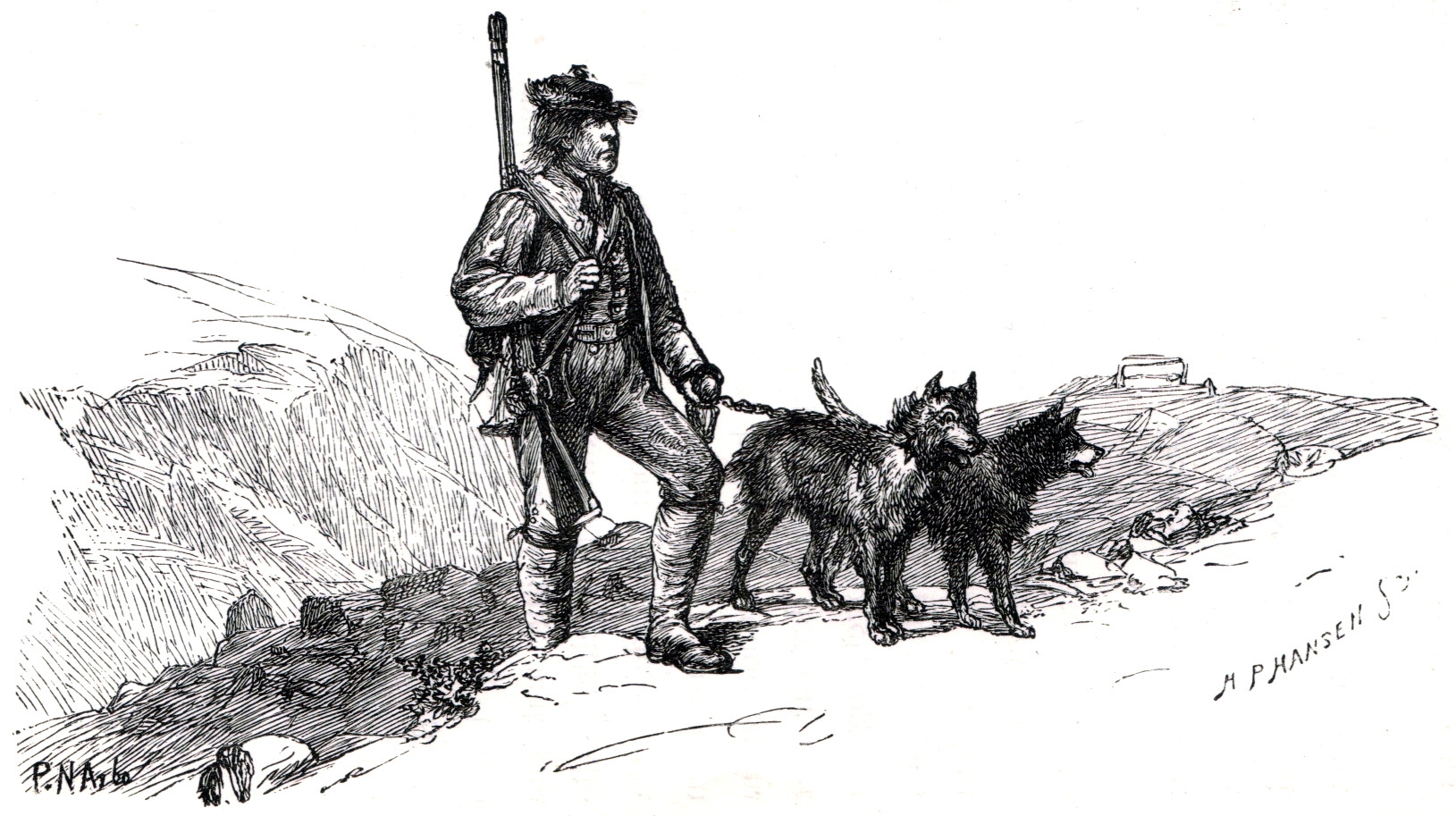
"Per Gynt", illustration by Peter Nicolai Arbo from Norske Huldre-Eventyr og Folkesagn (1845).

Per Gynt (pronounced [peːr ˈjʏnt], locally [pæːr ˈjʏnt]) is a Norwegian fairy-tale which originated in the traditional region of Gudbrandsdal.

== Setting ==
The story of Per Gynt is set in the historic district of Gudbrandsdal in Norway. Per Gynt's home in the folklore is traditionally claimed to have been the Nordre Hågå farm in Sødorp parish of what is now Nord-Fron Municipality in Innlandet county.

== Narrative and themes ==
The tales encompass the themes of identity, relationships, and personal stories from a lonely hunter. The folk tale tells of the eponymous Per Gynt and his various exploits. He rescues three dairy-maids from trolls and shoots the Bøyg, a troll which takes the form of a gigantic serpent and stands as a hindrance to travellers.

== Written record ==
The fairy-tale was recorded by Peter Christen Asbjørnsen in Norwegian Folktales (Norske Huldre-Eventyr og Folkesagn) which was first published in 1845. Asbjørnsen included the stories about Per Gynt into the section "Reindeer Hunting at Rondane" (Rensdyrjakt ved Rondane).

== Adaptation ==
The folktale served as inspiration for Henrik Ibsen's play Peer Gynt which was published in 1867. Ibsen added considerable material, such as Per Gynt travelling to Africa, crossing the Sahara and meeting with a Bedouin princess – 19th-century themes far beyond the scope of the original fairy-tale. The play appeared on stage in 1876, accompanied by incidental music by composer Edvard Grieg, who later prepared the Peer Gynt Suites.

== Other sources ==
- Hult, Marte H. (2003). Framing a National Narrative: The Legend Collections of Peter Christen Asbjørnsen. (Wayne State University Press). ISBN 0814330061.
- Meyer, Michael (1974) Ibsen: A Biograph (Abridged edition. Pelican Biographies ser. Harmondsworth: Penguin) ISBN 014021772X
- Sverre Mørkhagen (1997) Peer Gynt – historie, sagn og «forbandet Digt» (Oslo: J.W. Cappelens forlag.) ISBN 82-02-16417-6
