= Dryad =

Tree nymph in Greek mythology

The Dryad by Evelyn De Morgan

A dryad (/ˈdraɪ.æd/; Greek: Δρυάδες, sing. Δρυάς) is an oak tree nymph or oak tree spirit in Greek mythology; Drys (δρῦς) means "tree", and more specifically "oak" in Greek. Today the term is often used to refer to tree nymphs in general.

== Types ==
Most dryads, as nymphs, were supernaturally long-lived, but the lifespan of hamadryad nymphs was bound to an individual tree. Hamadryads were inextricably connected with their trees, such that if the tree died, the hamadryad associated with it also died. For these reasons, dryads and the Greek gods punished any mortal who harmed trees without first appeasing the tree-nymphs.

The dryads of the ash tree were called the Meliae. The Meliae sisters tended the infant Zeus in Rhea's Cretan cave. In Hesiod's Theogony, Gaia gave birth to the Meliae after being made fertile by the blood of the castrated Uranus. Daphnaiai were nymphs of the laurel tree.

== Names ==
Some of the individual dryads or hamadryads are:

- Atlanteia and Phoebe, two of the many wives or concubines of Danaus
- Chrysopeleia
- Dryope
- Erato
- Eurydice
- Phigalia
- Tithorea

== In popular culture ==
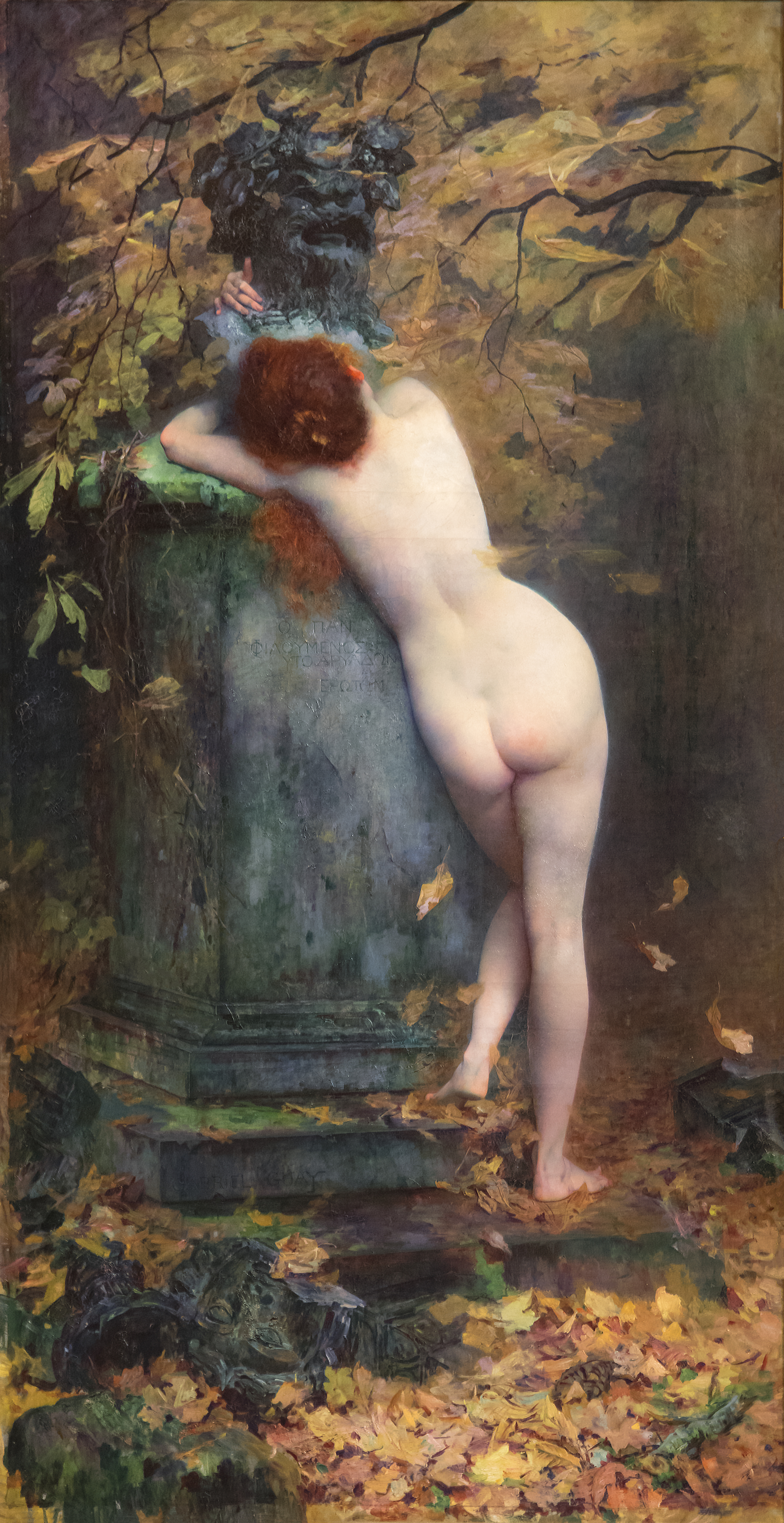
La dernière dryade (The Last Dryad) by Gabriel Guay, 1898.

- Keats addresses the nightingale as "light-winged Dryad of the trees", in his "Ode to a Nightingale".
- In the poetry of Donald Davidson they illustrate the themes of tradition and the importance of the past to the present.
- In The Chronicles of Narnia by C. S. Lewis, dryads appear as inhabitants of Narnia, as do many creatures from Greek mythology. In Prince Caspian the activity of the Telmarines in felling trees and defiling streams forces the dryads and naiads – denizens of 'Old Narnia' – into a deep sleep, from which they awaken when Bacchus and Silenus are summoned by Aslan to aid in the fight against King Miraz's army.

== See also ==
- Hulder or Skogsrå, a similar Nordic spirit
- Ghillie Dhu, a similar Scottish spirit
- Kodama, a similar Japanese spirit
- Green spirit, a similar spirit found in Myanmar and other Buddhist countries
- Elf, a similar mythical creature associated with nature
- Leshy, a similar spirit from Slavic folklore
- Plant soul, the soul of a plant in religious traditions
- Querquetulanae, Roman nymphs of the oak
- Rådande, a similar Swedish spirit
- Salabhanjika, a similar Indian spirit
- Mavka, a similar Ukrainian spirit
