= Sven Andersson (farmworker) =

Character in Swedish folklore

Sven Andersson (1668–1691), was a Swedish farmhand from Vättle in Västergötland, who was executed for having sexual intercourse with a bergsrå (a mountain-nymph; a mythical female creature of the mountain). The case is often quoted to illustrate the cases where humans were sentenced to death accused of having sexual relations with mythical creatures, and was likely the last one of such cases in Sweden. It also provides a good illustration of the phenomenon known as bergtagning (Literary: Taken by the mountain), which is a well-attested belief in old Scandinavia.

== The case ==
Andersson was a farm worker. In 1690, he was observed by the parish vicar Petrus Magni Kellander to be pale and exhausted. The farmer Lars Jonsson informed Kellander that Andersson was often: "abducted by the bergrå and remained with her for days". When Andersson was questioned by Kellander as to the truth about these occurrences, he answered: "God help me, so it is!"

Sven Andersson stated, that he had fallen asleep in the woods one autumn day when searching for a missing goat, when he was taken in to the mountain by a woman in white. She gave him food and drink and had sexual intercourse with him. Kellander had him watched, gave him religious instruction and made him promise to stay away from the places where the supernatural woman used to meet him and take him away.

Shortly after this, Andersson was arrested because of the rumors. Before the court, Andersson described his first abduction in greater detail. He claimed that he had fallen asleep inside a hollow oak tree. During the night, he woke up, and discovered the woman in white before him. She promised to give him the missing cattle if he followed her. He agreed, and they passed inside the mountain as if through a door. Inside the mountain, there was a great hall of light with beds on one side and a fireplace to the left, filled with idle and beautifully dressed men and women. The woman who took him there sat down with him alone at one of the tables and fed him. Thereafter, they lay in one of the beds and had sex.

By contemporary law, there was no bergrå, but there was a firm belief in the devil, and a female spirit of this kind was legally interpreted as a female demon, a succubus. The court had him examined, and the examination of his body was claimed to have resulted in proof of supernatural intercourse. Andersson was sentenced to death by the local court for his confession. This verdict was reportedly confirmed by the higher court. Thereby, it would have been carried out, though this has not been confirmed.

== See also ==
- Karin Svensdotter
- Peder Jönsson
