= The Wood Nymph =

Tone poem by Jean Sibelius

- Tone poem by Jean Sibelius
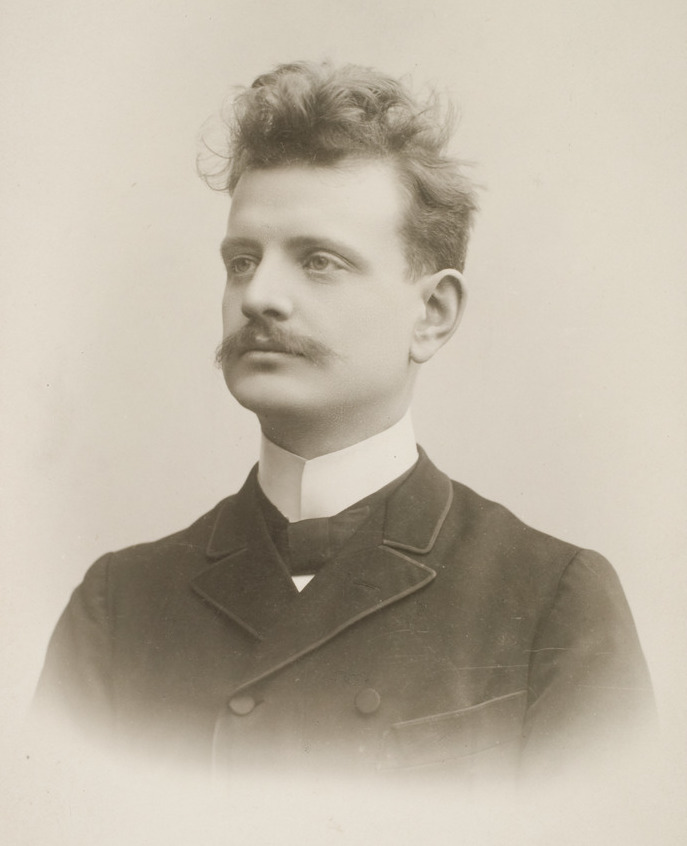
- The composer (c. 1895)
- Native name: Skogsrået
- Opus: 15
- Composed: 1894–1895
- Publisher: Breitkopf & Härtel (2006)
- Duration: 22 mins.

Premiere
- Date: 17 April 1895
- Location: Helsinki, Grand Duchy of Finland
- Conductor: Jean Sibelius
- Performers: Helsinki Philharmonic Society

The Wood Nymph (Swedish: Skogsrået; subtitled ballade pour l'orchestre), Op. 15, (Note: During the tone poem's long period of obscurity, the dramatic monologue was listed as 'Op.15' in the Sibelius worklists and the tone poem was omitted.) is a programmatic tone poem for orchestra composed in 1894 and 1895 by the Finnish composer Jean Sibelius. The ballade, which premiered on 17 April 1895 in Helsinki, Finland, with Sibelius conducting, follows the Swedish writer Viktor Rydberg's 1882 poem of the same title, in which a young man, Björn, wanders into the forest and is seduced and driven to despair by a skogsrå, or wood nymph. Organizationally, the tone poem consists of four informal sections, each of which corresponds to one of the poem's four stanzas and evokes the mood of a particular episode: first, heroic vigor; second, frenetic activity; third, sensual love; and fourth, inconsolable grief.

The Wood Nymph was performed three more times that decade, then, at the composer's request, once more in 1936. Never published, the ballade had been thought to be comparable to insubstantial works and juvenilia which Sibelius had suppressed until the Finnish musicologist Kari Kilpeläinen 'rediscovered' the manuscript in the University of Helsinki archives, "[catching] Finland, and the musical world, by surprise". Osmo Vänskä and the Lahti Symphony Orchestra gave the ballade its modern-day 'premiere' on 9 February 1996. Although the score had been effectively 'lost' for sixty years, its thematic material had been known in abridged form via a melodrama for narrator, piano, two horns, and strings. Sibelius probably arranged the melodrama from the tone poem, although he claimed the opposite. Some critics, while admitting the beauty of the musical ideas, have faulted Sibelius for over-reliance on the source material's narrative and lack of the rigorously unified structure that characterized his later output, whereas others, such as Veijo Murtomäki, have hailed it as a "masterpiece" worthy of ranking amongst Sibelius's greatest orchestral works.

== Composition ==
Sibelius admired Rydberg and often set his poetry to music, including the melodrama Snöfrid, Op. 29, and the War Song of Tyrtaeus. The poem Skogsrået was first published in 1882, and in 1883 Sibelius's future friend, the artist Akseli Gallen-Kallela, illustrated it. In 1888 or 1889, about the time the two met, Sibelius first set Skogsrået for voice and piano. This setting is musically unrelated to Sibelius's 1894–95 treatment. (Note: In the collected works, it is catalogued as JS 171.)

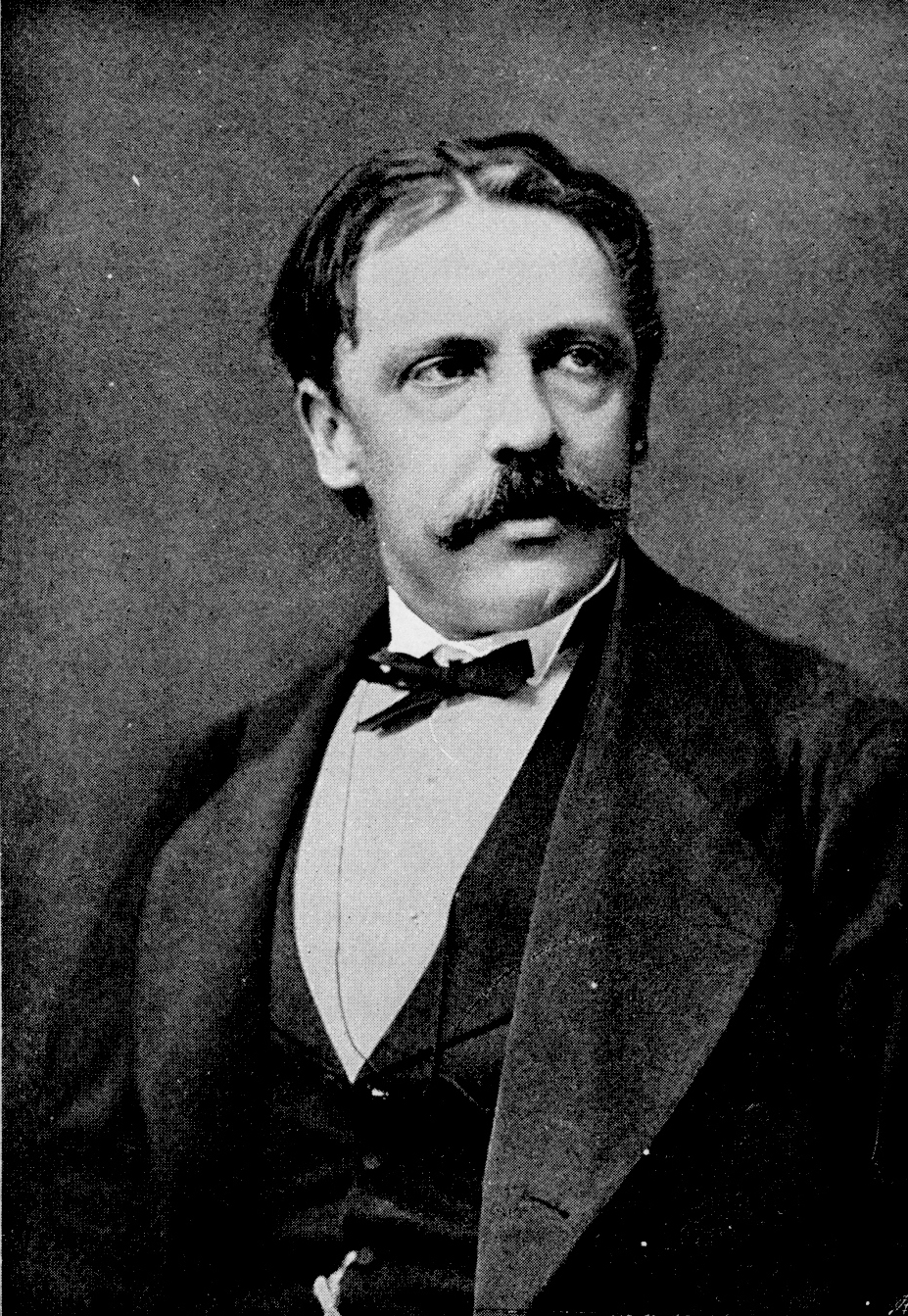
Rydberg in 1876

In 1894, although Sibelius was a national figure in Finland and had completed major works like Kullervo and the Karelia Suite, he was still struggling to break free of Wagnerian models and develop a truly individual style. The origin of the tone poem remains obscure but The Wood Nymph may well have gradually evolved out of music for a verismo opera that Sibelius had planned but never realized. The libretto, as related in a letter from Sibelius dated 28 July 1894, tells the story of a young, engaged student who, while travelling abroad, meets and is attracted by an exotic dancer. Upon his return, the student describes the dance and dancer so vividly that his fiancée concludes he has been unfaithful; the opera ends with a funeral procession for the student's fiancée (the letter is unclear as to her cause of death). Furthermore, in a letter from 10 August 1894, Sibelius informs his wife, Aino, of a new composition "in the style of a march". Murtomäki argues that Sibelius readily adapted his previous musical ideas to the plot of Skogsrået: the march became Björn's theme from the first section of The Wood Nymph, the protagonist "tak[ing] himself off (abroad)" became the frenetic chase of the second, the unfaithfulness with the dancer became the seduction by the evil skogsrå in the third, and the opera's funeral procession became the despair of Björn in the finale.

While both tone poem and melodrama would emerge from this material, it is not clear which musical form Sibelius initially used to tackle Rydberg's poem. In the 1930s, the composer claimed he had first composed the melodrama (premiered on 9 March 1895 at a lottery ball benefiting the Finnish Theatre where it was narrated by Axel Ahlberg), only to realize subsequently that "the material would allow a more extensive treatment" as a symphonic poem. Scholars, however, have disputed this chronology, arguing that, given the premiere of the tone poem a mere month later, it is "improbable, if not totally impossible" that Sibelius could have expanded the melodrama so quickly. He probably "compressed" the earlier tone poem, eliminating bridges and repetitions, to produce the streamlined melodrama. The manuscript of the melodrama has far fewer corrections than the manuscript of the tone poem, which supports this view. Sibelius also arranged the conclusion for solo piano. (Note: With the title Ur "Skogsrået" (English: From "Skogsrået").)

== Performance history ==
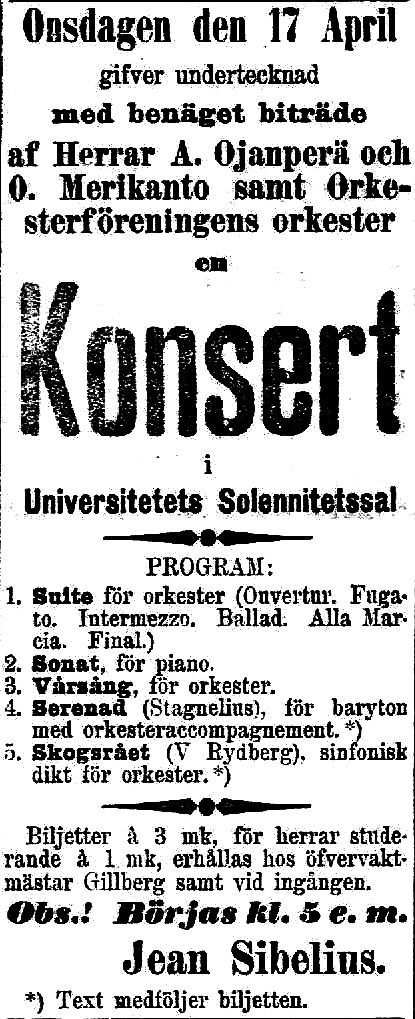
An 17 April1896 advertisement (in Swedish) from Hufvudstadsbladet promoting the premiere of Sibelius's The Wood Nymph

The tone poem premiered on 17 April 1895, at the Great Hall of the University of Helsinki, with Sibelius himself conducting the Helsinki Philharmonic Society; the programme also included the tone poem Vårsång (Spring Song) and selections from the Karelia Suite. A repeat performance was given two days later. Despite its positive reception, The Wood Nymph would only be played another five times in Sibelius's lifetime: twice in Turku on 29 and 30 November 1897; twice in Helsinki at the premiere of his Symphony No. 1 on 26 and 30 April 1899 (a highly important event in Sibelius's career, and a sign that he viewed The Wood Nymph as a worthy counterpoint to the symphony); and, after a 37-year hiatus, once in Helsinki on 27 October 1936. (Note: The melodrama was performed in Tampere in 1898 and in Joensuu in 1911.) Sibelius, who was in his seventies and had retired to Ainola, was not present for this final performance, although he appears to have personally selected The Wood Nymph for the programme; Georg Schnéevoigt, who cut the score extensively in order to fit the performance into the radio broadcast's allotted time, conducted the Helsinki Philharmonic, with President Pehr Evind Svinhufvud, Prime Minister Kyösti Kallio, and Marshal Carl Gustaf Emil Mannerheim in attendance.

After 1936, The Wood Nymph again disappeared from the repertoire. Throughout his career, Sibelius was troubled with creative 'blocks' and bouts of depression. This led him to commit score to the flames when he felt unable to revise them to the level he demanded. This was the fate most notoriously of the Symphony No. 8, but also of many works from the 1880s and 1890s. He did not, however, destroy The Wood Nymph. The ballade lay neglected amongst the more than 10,000 pages of papers and scores which the composer's family had deposited in 1982 at the University of Helsinki Library archive. The work was 'rediscovered' by the manuscript expert Kari Kilpeläinen; its subsequent inspection by Fabian Dahlström "caught Finland, and the musical world, by surprise": the tone poem, 22 minutes in length and scored for full orchestra, was far more than the melodrama "recast without the speaker" many in the Sibelius establishment had assumed it to be. The Wood Nymph received its modern-day 'world premiere' on 9 February 1996 by the Lahti Symphony Orchestra, with Osmo Vänskä conducting. Vänskä had received permission from Sibelius's family to perform the work. Out of necessity, Vänskä supplemented the manuscript—full of edits and, thus, "very difficult to read" in isolation—with notes from the 1936 performance. In 2006, Breitkopf & Härtel published the first edition of The Wood Nymph.

== Instrumentation ==
The Wood Nymph is scored for the following instruments, organized by family (woodwinds, brass, percussion, and strings):

- 2 flutes (one doubling piccolo), 2 oboes, 2 clarinets (in A; one doubling bass clarinet (in A)), and 2 bassoons
- 4 horns (in F), 3 trumpets (in F), and 3 trombones
- Timpani, Bass drum, cymbals, tambourine, and triangle
- Violins (I and II), violas, cellos, and double basses

== Structure ==
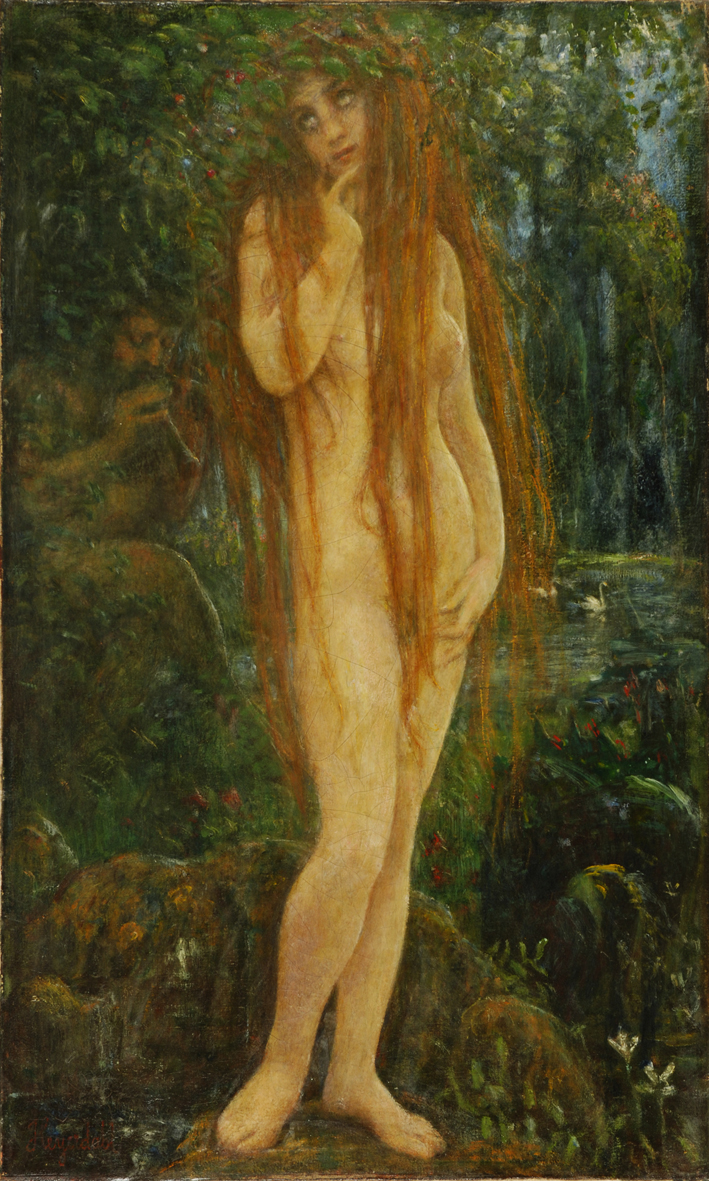
Nymfen by the Norwegian realist painter Hans Heyerdahl, c. 1890

In 1893, Sibelius had expressed his belief in the necessity of poetic motivation in music in a letter to the poet J. H. Erkko, "I believe that music alone, that is absolute music, can not satisfy. It awakens feelings and states of mind but always something unsatisfied remains in our souls..." In a letter to Aino from August 1894, Sibelius claimed to be "really a tone painter and poet" in the mold of the symphonic poems of Liszt. In The Wood Nymph, Sibelius adheres closely to the narrative structure of Rydberg's poem, so much so that at the 1895 premiere, audience members were provided with copies of the source material, indicating the centrality of Rydberg's plot to the performance. Due to its programmatic qualities, musicologists commonly describe The Wood Nymph, although in one movement, as consisting of four informal sections or "dramatic tableaux", each of which corresponds to one of the poem's four stanzas:

1. Alla marcia
2. Vivace assai—Molto vivace
3. Moderato
4. Molto lento

=== First section ===
Björn, "a tall and handsome lad", is announced by a heroic brass fanfare. His strength and good looks have aroused "the cunning spirits", and on his way to a feast one summer evening, he is entranced by the "singing" woods. The opening music, "breezy" and triumphant in C major, recalls the Karelia Overture, Op. 10 (not to be confused with the Karelia Suite, Op. 11) which Sibelius had written in 1893, and betrays no sign of Björn's impending fate. Björn's theme is recapitulated at the end of the second section.

Original Swedish

Han Björn var en stor och fager sven
med breda väldiga skuldror
Med smärtare midja än andre män
slikt retar de snöda huldror.
Till gille han gick en höstlig kväll,
då månen sken över gran och häll,
och vinden drog
med hi och ho
över myr och skog,
över hult och mo;
då var honom trolskt i hågen,
han ser åt skogen och har ej ro,
han skådar åt himlabågen,
men träden de vinka och nicka,
och stjärnorna blinka och blicka:
gå in, gå in, gå in i vinande furumo!

English translation

Björn was a tall and handsome lad
With broad and mighty shoulders,
With a tighter waist than other men
He rouses those cunning spirits.
To a feast he went one autumn eve,
When the moon shone over spruce and crag,
And the wind blew on
With its shoos and shees
Over marsh and copse,
Over holt and heath;
It all bewitched his thinking:
He beholds the forest with great unease,
He beholds the skies above,
But the trees they are waving and nodding,
And the stars are twinking and blinking:
Go in, go in, go into the whining woods!

=== Second section ===
Björn "willingly but under duress", plunges deep into the magical Nordic forest and is enchanted by evil, mischievous dwarves, who "knit a web of moonbeams" and "hoarsely laugh at their prisoner". Considered by some critics to be the tone poem's most striking section, the "proto-minimalist" music in A minor is at once hypnotic and delightfully propulsive: Sibelius repeats and reworks the same short motif (belonging initially to the clarinets) into a rich woodwind tapestry, quickening the tempo and adding off-beat horns and pulsating trombones, to produce what Murtomäki has described as a "modal-diatonic sound field".

Original Swedish

Han går, han lyder det mörka bud,
han gör det villig och tvungen;
men skogens dvärgar i kolsvart skud,
de fara med list i ljungen
och knyta ett nät af månens sken
och skuggan från gungande kvist och gren,
ett dallrande nät
i ris och snår
bak vandrarens fjät,
där fram han går
och skratta så hest åt fången.
I hidena vakna ulv och lo,
men Björn han drömmer vid sången
som runt från furorna ljuder
och viskar, lockar och bjuder:
gå djupare, djupare in i villande furumo!

English translation

He walks on, obeys the dark command,
Gladly he goes, compelled along;
But the forest's dwarves in jet black garb,
Step stealthily on through the heather
And weave a net of moonbeams
And shadows of swaying twigs and stems,
A quivering net
In bosk and copse
Behind the wanderer's footsteps,
As on he goes,
And so hoarsely they laugh at their prisoner.
In their dens wake wolf and lynx,
But Björn, he dreams with the song
Arising from the forest's sighs
And whispers, luring and inviting him:
Go deeper, deeper into the boundless woods!

=== Third section ===
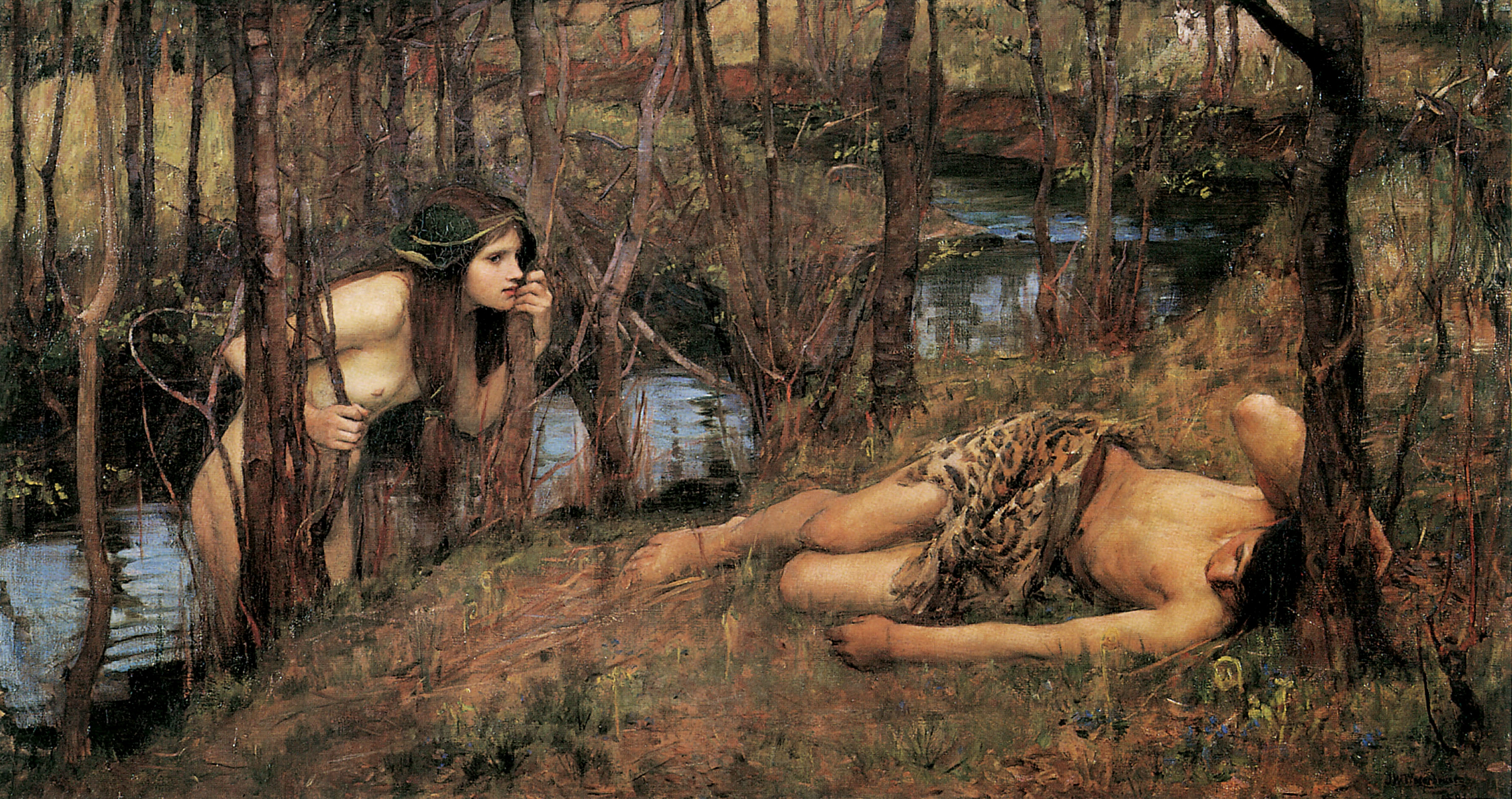
The theme of a mortal man (in this case the sleeping Hylas), seduced and doomed by a supernatural female is an enduring theme in folklore and art. Here is Hylas with a Nymph, 1893, by John William Waterhouse

Björn encounters and is seduced by a beautiful wood nymph (skogsrå). The sensual, midsummer-night music in C♯ major is "bathed in an erotic afterglow"; a solo cello cantilena, joined by horn and pizzicato strings, representing the nymph's erotic advances. "Who could resist," Glenda Dawn Goss has written in mock defense, "her [the nymph's] throaty solo cello voice, her sensuously swaying movements, a white limb glimpsed, honey-smooth, beneath a moon-white gown, a sweetly heaving breast?"

Original Swedish

Nu tystnar brått den susande vind,
och sommardäglig är natten,
och vällukt ångar från blommig lind
vid kärnens sovande vatten.
I skuggan hörs ett prasslande ljud:
Där böljar en skär, och månvit skrud,
där vinkar en arm,
så mjäll och rund,
där häves en barm,
där viskar en mund,
där sjunka två ögon i dina
och leka så blå en evig tro,
att alla minnen försina;
de bjuda dig domna och glömma,
de bjuda dig somna och drömma
i älskogsro i vyssande sövande furumo.

English translation

Now the sighing wind abates,
And summer sweet is the night,
And soft smells rise from the blooming limes
By the pool of sleepy water.
In the shadows, a rustling sound is heard:
A skerry looms up, and a moon-white shroud,
There waves an arm,
So fine and round,
There rises a bosom,
There whispers a mouth,
There shine two eyes into yours
And prove so blue, forever true,
So that all memories can wither;
They offer you doom and gloom,
They offer you sleep and dreaming
In the leafy peace of hushing, sleeping woods.

=== Fourth section ===
Having lost any hope of earthly happiness (in Swedish folklore, a man who succumbed to the skogsrå was doomed to lose his soul), Björn despairs. The music mutates from the erotic C♯ major to a dark and mournful 'funeral march' in C♯ minor. As the undulating, "aching" violin theme crashes against the brass, Björn is left with "inconsolable grief", obsessed with the memory of the skogsrå. "Hardly ever has music been written," wrote the music critic of the newspaper Uusi Suometar following the 1899 performance, "which would more clearly describe remorse."

Original Swedish

Men den, vars hjärta ett skogsrå stjäl,
får aldrig det mer tillbaka
till drömmar i månljus trår hans själ,
kan han ej älska en maka.
De ögon blå i nattlig skog
ha dragit hans håg från harv och plog,
han kan ej le
och fröjdas som förr,
och åren de se
inom hans dörr,
men finna ej barn och blomma;
han vesäll åldras i öde bo,<
kring härden stå sätena tomma,
och väntar han något av åren,
så väntar han döden och båren,
Han lyss, han lyss med oläkeligt ve till suset i furumo.

English translation

But he whose heart a wood nymph stole,
Can never hope to retrieve it:
Till dreams in moonlight take his soul,
He will show no love for a woman.
The blue eyes in the nightly grove
Have drawn his mind from harrow and plow,
He cannot laugh
And rejoice any more,
And the years they peer
In through his door,
But find no blooms or children;
He grows old and grumpy in a bare abode,
Around the hearth stand empty seats,
And if awaiting what years will bring,
He awaits but death and the funeral bier,
He listens, he listens with forlorn grief to the sighing of the trees.

== Reception ==
Although well received upon its premiere, critical opinion as to the merit of The Wood Nymph has varied. Following the 1895 premiere, Oskar Merikanto, writing in Päivälehti, praised Sibelius for having "masterfully" recreated Rydberg's plot with the use of "unique and fascinating colors", while critic Karl Flodin complained in Nya Pressen that it was "unquestionably too long". Modern day opinion has been similarly equivocal. While conceding that The Wood Nymph contains "some splendid melodic ideas" and "luxuriant scoring", Erik Tawaststjerna has characterized the work as the "experiment" of a composer "still trying to find his feet as a tone-poet", suggesting that Sibelius is too dependent on the source material's narrative structure. (Note: Tawaststjerna, incidentally, must have been one of the very few to examine the manuscript of the orchestral version during its long obscurity.) Murtomäki, though praising the ballade for its "unforced freshness of vision and tonal audacity" and "well elaborated, original and inventive characters", agrees with Tawaststjerna that The Wood Nymph is too episodic in construction:

As a whole, Skogsrået is not a highly unified organism like Sibelius’s subsequent large orchestral works: the four Lemminkäinen legends and the first two symphonies...The formal problem is that the links are, for the most part, missing; Sibelius simply juxtaposes different formal sections without connective elements smoothing over the junctures. In view of his later mastery of the "art of transition," achieved by subtly overlapping different textures and tempos, in Skogsrået Sibelius is still at the beginning of his development.

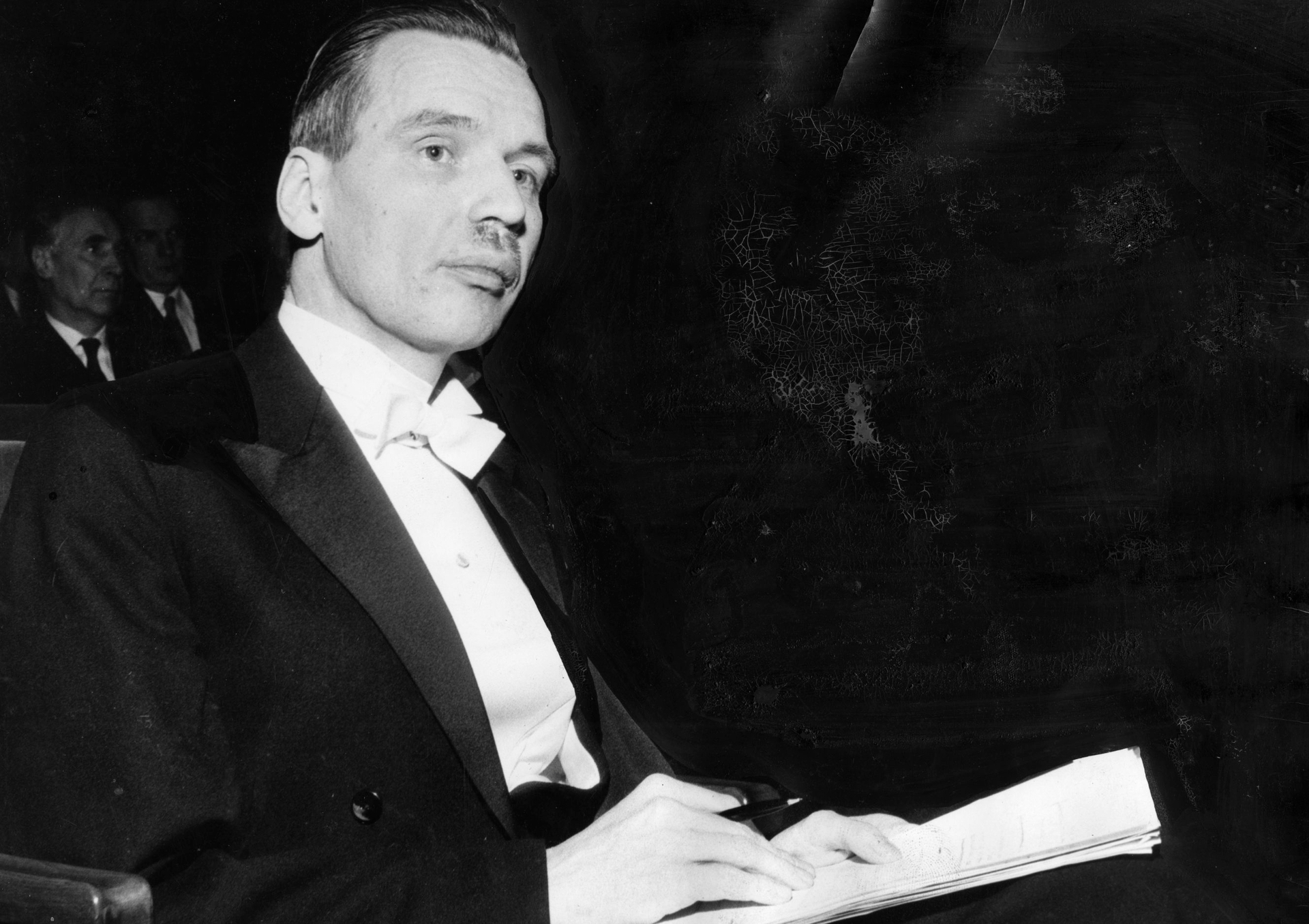
Erik Tawaststjerna, musicologist, friend and biographer of Sibelius

Guy Rickards, concurring that The Wood Nymph "never quite escapes a dependence on the verses", has echoed Tawaststjerna in wondering what might have been had Sibelius returned in his maturity to The Wood Nymph, as with En saga. Finnish composer Kalevi Aho's response has been similar, calling the ballade "an interesting work" in need of "more polishing". Finnish conductor Osmo Vänskä, however, has championed the ballad. "It's a tremendous piece," Vänskä has said in interview. "He [Sibelius] never managed to revise it, but nothing is wrong with the music. Sibelius never forbade performance of The Wood Nymph." Stylistically, scholars have detected in The Wood Nymph the influence of Richard Wagner. Murtomäki, for example, discerns the "erotic harmonic vocabulary" of Tristan und Isolde in the third section and the "motive of the forbidden question" from Lohengrin in the funereal march from the finale. In light of Sibelius's "Nietzschean response" to Wagner's operas (initially enamored, Sibelius by July 1894 had repudiated Wagner's ideas as "calculated" and "manufactured"), such observations are of particular interest in that they illustrate the extent to which Sibelius, at the time of The Wood Nymph, had not yet succeeded in breaking with the German master.

== Analysis ==
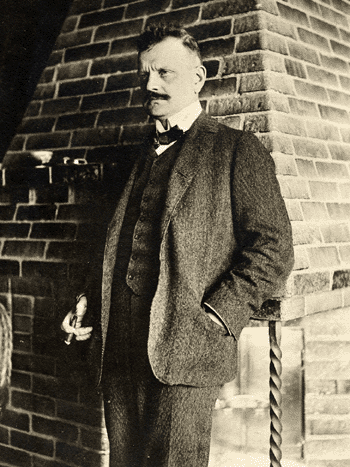
Sibelius in 1907

=== Autobiographical details ===
A few musicologists have speculated that The Wood Nymph is potentially autobiographical. Murtomäki, most notably, has argued that the tone poem's depiction of "a fatal sexual conjunction" between Björn and the skogsrå is a possible allusion to the composer's own youthful indiscretions. "The strong autobiographical element in Skogsrået is unmistakable", Murtomäki has written, adding that in the ballade, "Sibelius probably confesses an affair to Aino". For Murtomäki, the balladic nature of The Wood Nymph is key, as in the genre "it was expected that the singer/storyteller/composer should reveal himself". At the time, it was common for the first sexual partners of men of Sibelius's class to be prostitutes. Murtomäki says that "In their concealed or "unofficial" sexual life, they experienced a certain type of female sexual adventurousness that their wives could not easily match." He hypothesizes that The Wood Nymph and other contemporaneous compositions were Sibelius's method of dealing with the emotional consequences of this and his guilt towards his wife Aino.

With its focus on sexual fantasy, The Wood Nymph differs sharply from the Rydberg poem Snöfrid which Sibelius set in 1900. In Snöfrid, Gunnar, the patriotic hero, resists a water nymph's sensuous "embrace" to instead "fight the hopeless fight" for his country and "die nameless". The contrast between Björn and Gunnar, Murtomäki argues, reflects Sibelius's own personal transformation: crowned a "national hero" following the 1899 premiere of the Symphony No. 1, Sibelius wished to demonstrate that he had "outgrown his early adventurism" and learned to place country before "libertine" excess. Murtomäki's conclusion, however, is not universally accepted. David Fanning, in his review of the edited volume in which Murtomäki's essay appears, has savaged as "dubious" and "tendentious" such autobiographical speculations. Per Fanning: "For Murtomäki every half-diminished chord seems to be a Tristan chord, with all the symbolic baggage that entails...Such half-baked hermeneutics baffle and alienate...enthusiasm has occasionally been allowed to run riot".

=== Lack of publication ===
Why Sibelius should have failed to prepare The Wood Nymph for publication is a question that has perplexed scholars. On the advice of Ferruccio Busoni, Sibelius in 1895 offered The Wood Nymph to the Russian music publisher Mitrofan Belyayev but it was not published. Murtomäki has suggested that Sibelius, despite having been fond of The Wood Nymph, was "unsure about the true value" of his output from the 1890s, an ambivalence that is perhaps best illustrated by the piecemeal publication history of, and multiple revisions to, the four Lemminkäinen legends (appearing in the composer's 1911 diary under a list of works to be rewritten, The Wood Nymph, too, seems to have been scheduled by Sibelius for a reexamination, albeit one that never came to pass). Scholars have offered a number of explanations as to why Sibelius may have "turned his back" on his early compositions. Perhaps, as master, he looked back on the works of his youth as technically "inferior" to his mature output; or, as evolving artist, he sought distance from passionate, nationalistic exclamations as he developed his own, unique musical style and aimed to transition from "local hero" to "international composer"; or, as elder statesman, he feared he might have "revealed himself too much" in early "confessional" works, such as En saga, Lemminkäinen and the Maidens of the Island, and The Wood Nymph. In the absence of any new information from Sibelius's papers, however, the reason why The Wood Nymph was never published ultimately "appears doomed to remain a subject of speculation".

== Discography ==
Even after the wave of publicity that followed its reemergence, The Wood Nymph remains rarely recorded compared to other early Sibelius works. It received its world premiere in 1996 under the BIS label with Osmo Vänskä leading the Lahti Symphony Orchestra. (Some musical material was unavailable until the publication of the Breitkopf & Härtel JSW critical edition in 2006 and was thus not included on prior recordings.) The table below lists this and other commercially available recordings:

No.	Conductor	Orchestra	Rec. (Note: Refers to the year in which the performers recorded the work; this may not be the same as the year in which the recording was first released to the general public.)	Time	Recording venue	Label	Ref.
1	Osmo Vänskä (1)	Lahti Symphony Orchestra (1)	1996	21:36	Ristinkirkko	BIS	(Note: O. Vänskä–BIS (CD–815) 1996)
2	Shuntaro Sato	Kuopio Symphony Orchestra	2002	22:22	Kuopio Music Centre	Finlandia	(Note: S. Sato–Finlandia (0927–49598–2) yyyy)
3	Douglas Bostock	Gothenburg-Aarhus Philharmonic	2007	21:05	Frichsparken, Aarhus	Classico	(Note: D. Bostok–Classico (CLASSCD 733) 2007)
4	Osmo Vänskä (2)	Lahti Symphony Orchestra (2)	2007	21:37	Sibelius Hall	BIS	(Note: O. Vänskä–BIS (SACD–1745) 2014)
5	John Storgårds	Helsinki Philharmonic Orchestra	2010	24:05	Finlandia Hall	Ondine	(Note: J. Storgårds–Ondine (ODE 1147–2) 2010)
6	Santtu-Matias Rouvali	Gothenburg Symphony Orchestra	2023	22:04	Gothenburg Concert Hall	Alpha	(Note: S. Rouvali–Alpha (ALPHA 1008) 2023)

The 1888 version for voice and piano has been recorded by Anne Sofie von Otter. Erik Tawaststjerna also recorded the piano solo version together with the rest of Sibelius's piano transcriptions. The 1996 Vänskä recording also included the first recording of the melodrama, narrated by Lasse Pöysti.

== Bibliography ==
- Anderson, Martin (1996). "Sibelius's 'The Wood Nymph'". Tempo. 196 (196). Cambridge University Press: 51–52. JSTOR 944466.
- Barnett, Andrew (2007). Sibelius. New Haven: Yale University Press. ISBN 978-0-300-11159-0.
- Dahlström, Fabian [in Swedish] (2003). Jean Sibelius: Thematisch-bibliographisches Verzeichnis seiner Werke [Jean Sibelius: A Thematic Bibliographic Index of His Works] (in German). Wiesbaden: Breitkopf & Härtel. ISBN 3-7651-0333-0.
- Fanning, David (2001). "Review of Sibelius Studies". Music & Letters. 82 (4). Oxford University Press: 663–666. doi:10.1093/ml/82.4.663. JSTOR 3526300.
- Goss, Glenda Dawn (2009). Sibelius: A Composer's Life and the Awakening of Finland. London: University of Chicago Press. ISBN 978-0-226-30479-3.
- Grimley, Daniel M. (2004). "The Tone Poems: Genre, Landscape and Structural Perspective". In Grimley, Daniel M. (ed.). The Cambridge Companion to Sibelius. London: Cambridge University Press. ISBN 978-0-521-89460-9.
- Howell, Tim (2006). After Sibelius: Studies in Finnish Music. Ashgate Publishing. p. 32. ISBN 978-0-7546-5177-2.
- Kilinski, Karl (2013). Greek Myth and Western Art: The Presence of the Past. London: Cambridge University Press. ISBN 978-1-107-01332-2.
- Kurki, Eija (1999). "The Continuing Adventures of Sibelius's Wood-Nymphs: The Story So Far". Music Finland. Archived from the original on November 27, 2015.
- Mäkelä, Tomi (2007). Jean Sibelius. Woodbridge: Boydell & Brewer Ltd. ISBN 978-1-84383-688-9.
- Murtomäki, Veijo (2001). "Sibelius's symphonic ballad Skogsrået". In Jackson, Timothy; Murtomäki, Veijo (eds.). Sibelius Studies. London: Cambridge University Press. ISBN 978-0-521-62416-9.
- Rickards, Guy (1996). "Review". Tempo. 197. Cambridge University Press: 43–45. JSTOR 944443.
- Rydberg, Viktor (1882). "Skogsrået" (PDF). Naxos Music Library. pp. 114–115.
- Sirén, Vesa (2005). "Other Orchestral Works: Skogsrået (The Wood Nymph)". Sibelius.fi. Archived from the original on September 24, 2015.
- Tawaststjerna, Erik (1976). Sibelius: 1865–1905. Translated by Robert Layton. Berkeley and Los Angeles: University of California Press. ISBN 978-0-520-03014-5.
- Tumelty, Michael (February 3, 1996). "The Key to Settling an Old Score". The Herald. Glasgow. p. 13.
- Wicklund, Tuija, ed. (2015). Sibelius: Skogsraet – The Wood Nymph Op. 15. Wiesbaden: Breitkopf & Härtel. ISMN 979-0-004-21374-2.
