= Bøyg =

Legendary creature in Scandinavian folklore

The Bøyg (Norwegian: Bøygen, pronounced [ˈbœʏ(ɡ)]), also referred to as the "Great Bøyg of Etnedal" is a legendary gnome-like creature in Scandinavian folklore.

It is a great troll from Telemark and Gudbrandsdalen. It is commonly characterized as a giant, slimy serpent which stands as a hindrance to travellers. The name means 'bend', 'twist' or 'curve'. It appears in the fairy-tale of Per Gynt, the basis for Henrik Ibsen's play Peer Gynt.
