= Southampton Philharmonic Choir =

- Established: 1860; 166 years ago
- Registration no.: 1050107
- Legal status: Charitable incorporated organisation
- Purpose: Arts and culture
- Location: Southampton, England
- Website: www.southamptonphil.org
- Musical career
- Also known as: Sacred Harmonic Society (until 1873)
- Genre: Classical
- Members: ~170

The Southampton Philharmonic Choir is a large choral society based in Southampton, England. It has around 170 members and also benefits from collaborating with the students of the Southampton University Philharmonic Choir. The choir regularly performs with a professional orchestra, the New London Sinfonia, and is directed by David Gibson.

The choir is also known as Southampton Philharmonic Society and is a registered charity.

== History ==
The choir was founded in 1860, making it Southampton's longest-established music society. It performs works from the baroque and classical repertoire and also contemporary works. The choir has several "first performances in Southampton" to its name and sometimes commissions new works. In 1985, the choir received an Enterprise Award from the National Federation of Music Societies, now Making Music, in recognition of its varied programme and regular inclusion of contemporary works.

For the Millennium, Southampton Philharmonic Choir, jointly with Leeds Festival Chorus, commissioned a new oratorio The Fall of Jerusalem by Dominic Muldowney, with libretto by James Fenton. Both choirs performed the work, separately, in March 2000, the premiere being in Leeds.

The choir performs major concerts three times a year. Its main venue is Southampton Guildhall. It also regularly performs in Winchester Cathedral and the Turner Sims Concert Hall, Southampton.

The choir celebrated its 150th anniversary in 2010 with a concert on 24 April in Southampton Guildhall, performing Dominic Muldowney's The Fall of Jerusalem (see above) and Mozart's Requiem.

== Recent performances ==
=== 2010s ===
==== 2010-2011 Season ====
In the 2010-2011 season the choir performed the complete score of Peer Gynt, composed by Grieg as the incidental music to Ibsen's play Peer Gynt. The choir commissioned a complete English translation of the score, given its first performance at this concert, narrated by actor Samuel West. This finished off a memorable concert, which had opened with Mendelssohn's Hebrides Overture and Delius' Songs of Farewell. The remainder of the season included an accomplished Winchester Cathedral performance of Mozart's Symphony No 29, Solemn Vespers and Mass in C Minor, completed by a summer concert of choral and orchestral music by Elgar, Vaughan Williams and Parry, with the City of Southampton Orchestra.

The 2011-2012 season featured a performance of Handel's Messiah with the New London Sinfonia. The Southampton Echo described it as an "evening to remember," praising every aspect of the performance. Other performances included The Bells, along with Vocalise and Piano Concerto No 2 by Rachmaninov, and Poulenc's Gloria, and Haydn's The Creation.

==== 2012-2013 season ====
During the 2012-2013 season the choir performed Bach's Christmas Oratorio, followed by Verdi's Requiem (which was sung from memory so that the full range and power of this work could be heard), and a joint concert with the City of Southampton Orchestra, comprising Walton's Belshazzar's Feast and Te Deum, along with Elgar's Enigma Variations.

== Notable former conductors ==
Notable conductors of the Southampton Philharmonic Choir include:

- Sir Adrian Boult
- Sir Charles Groves
- Carl Davis
- David Hill
- Ian Partridge
