= Sjörå =

Swedish mythological creature

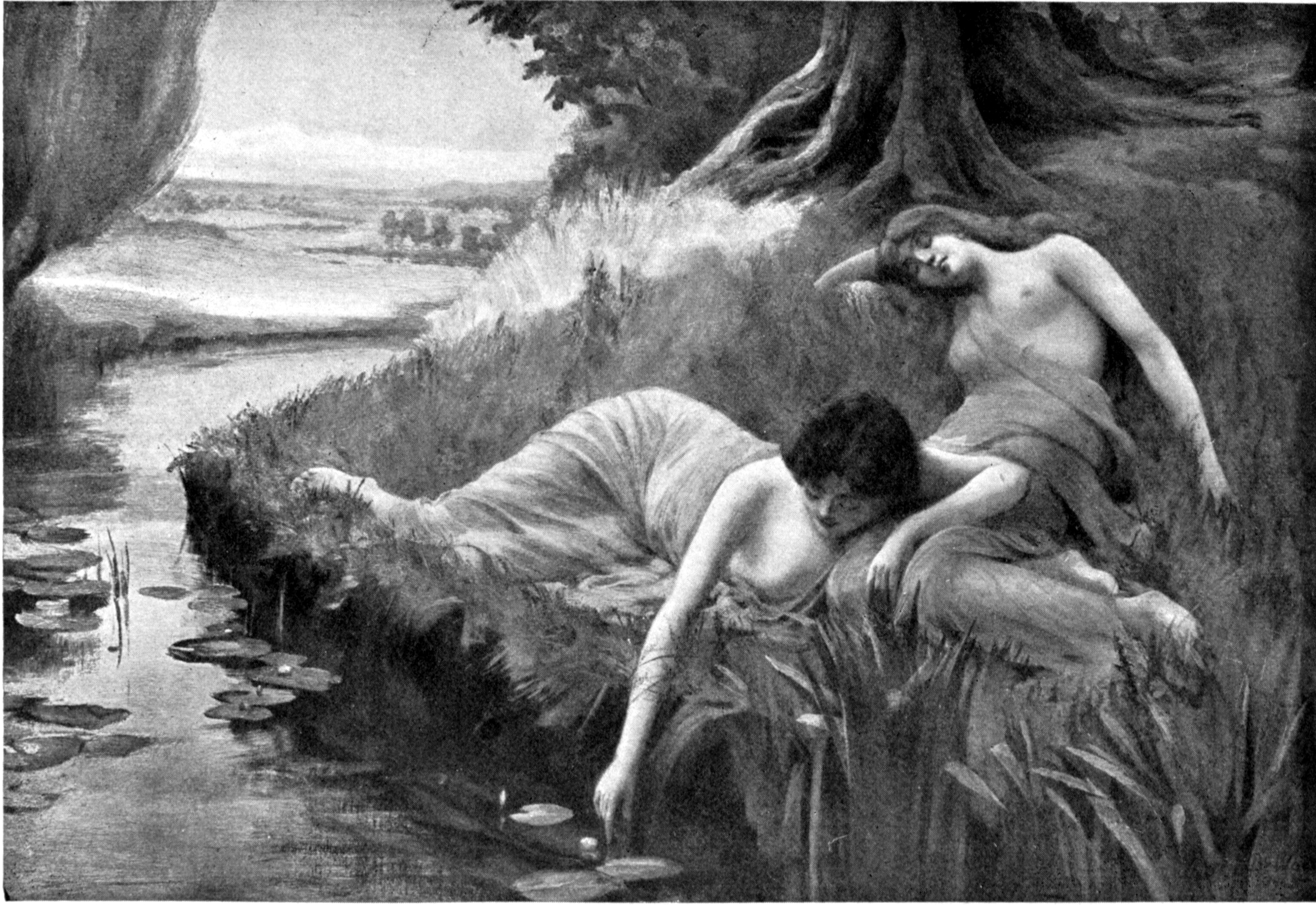
Huldra's Nymphs (sjörå) by Bernard Evans Ward (1909)

The sjörå (in Swedish), (lake Sjö) or the Sjöfru (Mistress of the Lake) was a mythical creature of the lake, or sjö, in Swedish folklore. The plural of sjörå is sjörån.

== Description and mythology ==
Sjörå are considered to be the aquatic equivalent of the skogsrå, in that they can help fishermen the same way the skogsrå can help hunters. They are generally less willing to become involved with humans than skogsrå due to the separation provided by the water.

Sjörå are usually described as female, humanoid water spirits. She is a seductive creature, often featured sitting and combing her long, sweeping hair with delight, and often lures and drowns men who are unkind, unfaithful or otherwise disrespectful to her or the lake. Like all other rå (keepers) she protects her domain and awards those kind to her with prosperous fishing and good luck, by rescuing them from drowning and warning of incoming storms. In wintertime she would sometimes stick her hand up from the waters. If the visitor then gave her a mitten she would thank him for his kindness with gifts or protect him in his time of need.

Male sjörå are described as appearing more like trolls, and are as protective of the water as female sjörå. Some stories have them attempt to drown or blind humans. One particular male sjörå named Håvålen lived amongst humans married a human woman before returning to the water at the end of his life.

== See also ==
- Peder Jönsson, a man executed for allegedly having sex with a sjörå.
