= Bergsrå =

Mythical creature in Norse folklore

The Bergsrå (Mountain Rå), Bergatrollet (Mountain Troll), or Bergakungen (Mountain King) was a mythical creature or spirit of the mountain in Norse mythology.

The bergsrå could be either masculine or feminine. It lived in the mountain with a court of relatives and sometimes surrounded by trolls. It was a common phenomenon in the mythology about the bergsrå to trick people into their dwellings in the mountain and to become bergtagen (literary: "taken into the mountain"). These bergtagnings (Swedish: abduction into the mountain) are usual are done by lone males and their victims tend to be women.

A typical description of such a claimed occurrence was given by Sven Andersson in 1691 when he was on trial for having sexual intercourse with a female bergsrå.

== See also ==
- Rå
- Oread
- Troll
- Hulder
- Nymph
- In the Hall of the Mountain King
- Stallo
- Wight
- Wild man

== Other sources ==
- Ake Hultkrantz Editor (1961) The Supernatural Owners Of Nature Nordic Symposion on The Religious Conceptions of Ruling Spirits (Genii loci, genii speciei) and Allied Concepts (Almquist & Wiksell)
