= Skogsrå =

Mythical creature in Swedish folklore

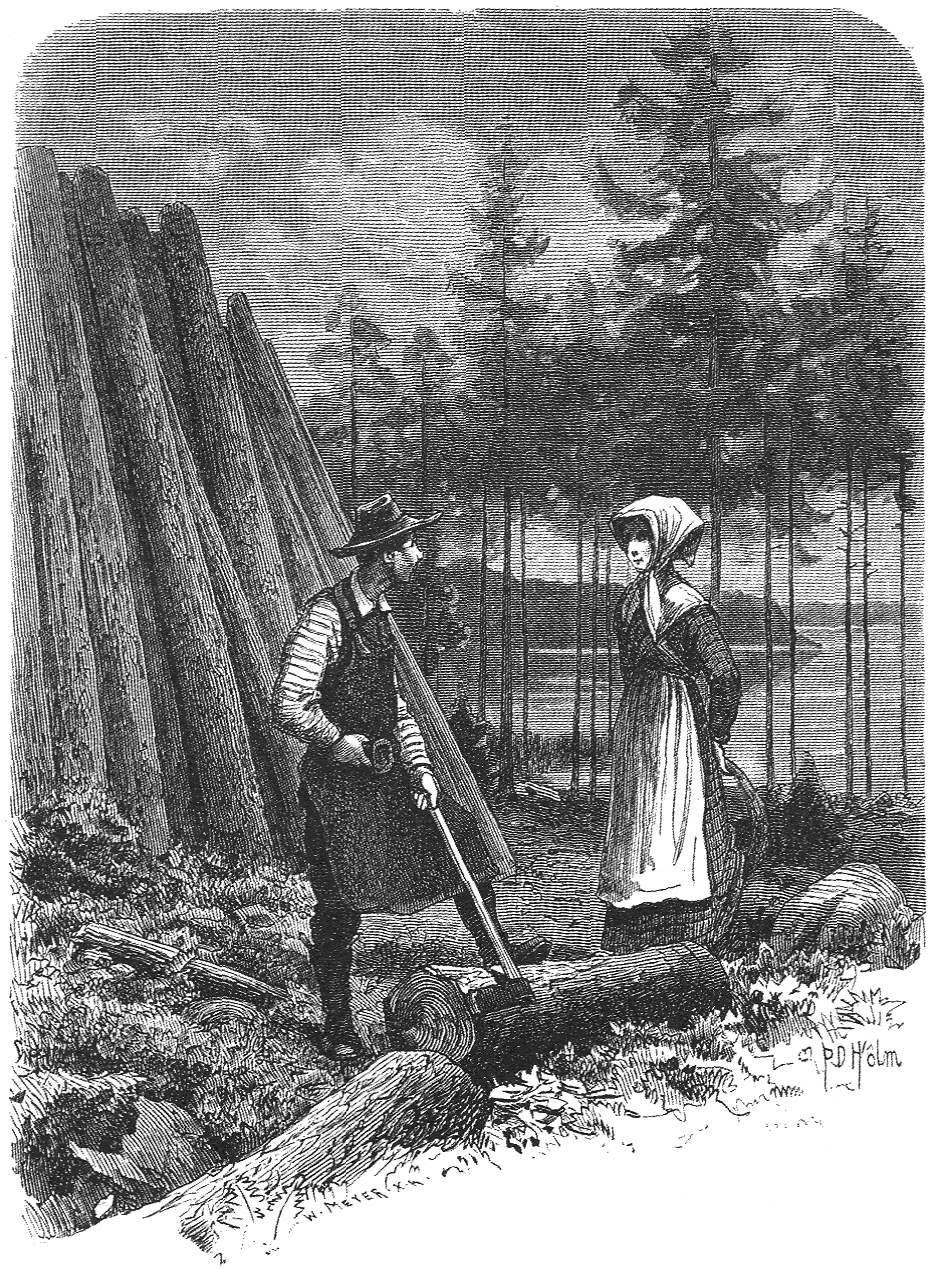
A Skogsrå meeting a man, as portrayed by artist Per Daniel Holm in the 1882 book Svenska folksägner

The skogsrå (Swedish definite form: skogsrået [ˈskʊ̂ksˌroːɛt]; lit. 'the forest rå'), skogsfru (definite: skogsfrun, 'the mistress of the forest'), skogsjungfru (definite: skogsjungfrun, 'the maiden of the forest'), skogssnua, skogssnuva, or skogsnymf (definite: skogssnuvan, skogsnymfen, 'the forest nymph'), is a mythical female creature (or rå) of the forest in Swedish folklore.

== General description ==
The skogsrå appears in the form of a beautiful woman with a seemingly friendly temperament. She appears like a woman from the front but seen from behind she often has a cow or fox tail, skin like a hollow, rotten tree trunk or a cloven foot. She is capable of shapeshifting to look like any woman or animal in the woods she resides over, but can never get rid of the aforementioned traits and therefore attempts to hide them. Often when she tries to approach in human disguise she is overdressed in wealth and finery, which is sometimes how the villagers are clued in to her true nature instead.

Whether she is depicted as malevolent and deceitful, or helpful to humans varies greatly between tales.

In some, she warps the forest for travelers, leading them astray and laughing at the victim. In one such tale a beguiled man thought he was led back home, only to come to his senses and find that he was in a swamp..

Men who had intercourse with the Skogsrå return changed, as their souls have remained with her. Hunters who please her, either through intercourse or acts of service, may be rewarded with good luck in the hunt, but should they be unfaithful to the skogsrå or shoot at her favorite animals, they will be punished with dire inconveniences.

She is also said to bestow her affection and bounty upon the charcoal burner,, woodcutter. or cattle herder, often by watching the former's kiln as he sleeps, warning the lumberjack when he encroaches on her bears and watching the cattle herders' animals. In one of these tales she asks the charcoal burner to carry her over the railroad tracks, as they are made of iron, and he returns home to find enough grain to keep him through the winter. In another common folk tale, a young boy finds her at a market, her tail visible beneath her skirts, and warns her that she needs to tuck it in to blend with the crowd and is also rewarded with wealth in turn.

The victim tricking the skogsrå to gain his freedom is a commonplace motif (ML 6000, "Tricking the Fairy Suitor"). This migratory motif usually involves learning a secret herbal recipe. For example, the skogsrå who seduced a man from his wife is tricked into revealing a cure of his love-craze, and there is usually inserted lines of verse naming the daphne (Swedish: tibast) and valerian (vändelrot). (Note: Cf. Lindow"s tale 39, "Tibast and Vändelrot". And in Lindow's tale 41 described below, the man learns to blend his gunpowder with herbs.) These two plants can be used as talisman to protect against her.

The hunter who decides to reject her right from the beginning can fire a shot at her, but after having to suffer a gloomy stormy night, his flames (of attraction) will be extinguished. It is said she can be killed by a silver bullet or with a gun loaded by herself. The silver bullet requirement to slay the skogsjungfrau is recorded even in Nyland (Uusimaa), Finland, where charcoal-burning laborers and farmhands making charcoal are told to be captivated.

The hiker may also turn his coat or sweater inside-out to ward against her seduction or be advised to do so when he loses his way on her account.

It is said the skogsrå owns the beasts of the forest.. The bears are called her "dogs", she rides the moose and grants game (successful hunt) to those who earn her favor. She also controls the weather of the forest, crying up storms when she is upset.

In some parts of Sweden, the skogsrå is considered to be one of the prey being chased by the Wild Hunt by some singular spirit or Odin's [wild] hunt, or by thunder.

== Tales and legends ==
In one tale, a man who has fallen under the spell of the skogsrå became gaunt and tormented. His friends restrained him to prevent his visit, but as the wood sprite approached, the man turned wild and started biting. An elder friend shot at her, and the other sprites carried her away. The shooter lost his eye, which was completely gone, but did not regret the decision.

In another tale, a man tricks his skogsrå into revealing the trick to make a sureshot at an elusive mark (to admix the gunpowder with roots and grass collected from the north face of the chimney), then affirms he will indeed use the trick to shoot her.

Another man tricked his skogsrå into revealing an herbal recipe (tibast or daphne, and vändelrot or valerian, aforementioned) for counteracting sexual attraction by claiming that he had an oversexed bull harassing the cows. Then he used the recipe to dispel her allure.

In one anecdote, a man encountered a skogsrå in Främmestad whose back was hollowed out like a trough for kneading bread, and she told him where to locate his horses. (Note: Cf. Norwegian Skogs-raa anecdote.)

The skogsrå may help the charcoal maker with his wood-fuel stack (mila) but will not reveal how it is done. She bears children with the charcoal-maker but instructs him to always knock on the pine thrice before coming home to approach her. When he forgets the routine, he sees her true form, and he is rid of her. There is another ending to the relationship, when the coal-maker casts a firebrand or ember and she screams "Sjálf (Self) burnt me", taken to mean "I burnt myself", as the coal-maker had passed off Sjálf as his name. (Note: There is a parallel to this with the Alpine German Fännge (cf. Polyphemus motif).)

== Related beings ==
Comparable beings in Swedish lore include the rånda(definite: råndan 'the rå'), the vittra the landa, and huldra (definite: huldran, 'the hulder' or 'hidden/invisible folk').

Sightings of the so-called lövjerska (pl. lövjerskor), practitioners of lövjeri (herb lore or "leaf magic"), in the woods have been grouped with encounters with skogsrå. Sydow considers lövjerska to be a "troll-woman" comparable to löviska[n] that is connected to trees, but lacks much lore, and segregates it from the skogsrå group. (Note: However Levander defined lövjerska as deciduous tree nymphs, claiming genuine skogsrå were associated with conifers.)

Directly borrowed from the Swedish version is the Norwegian version, or Skogs-raa, described in one tale as being like the hulder, and in the tale she helps a man by waking him up in time to catch up with the horses which had gone ahead of him.

Legend of the skogsrå also spread to Western Finland, where she is called metsänneitsyt 'Maiden of the Forest' or haapaneitsyt 'aspen maiden' in Finnish. The Finns of Northern Sweden called her metsänemäntä 'Mistress of the Forest'.

== Philately ==
The Skogsrå has been featured on commemorative stamps of Sweden. In the Europa 1981 series, skogsrå was part of a two stamp set paired with a troll stamp, based on illustrations by Svenolov Ehrén. It had been taken from an earlier work illustrating a book.

Later in March 2006, the creature became part of a two-stamp commemorative set featuring "Skogens mytiska väsen (mythical forest beings)", which featured the skogsrå ("Siren of the Woods" (Note: Translated as "Siren of the Woods" in the English explanatory text in the collector's set)) and the näcken (neck, nixie). (Note: Translated as "the Necken" in the collector's set, but -en is a definite article suffix, so "the" is redundant.) (Note: Sample images of used stamp and block.)

== Popular culture ==
- The character Esmeralda (played by Happy Jankell) in SVT's thriller television series Jordskott is called "what traditionally would be described as a skogsrå". She is shown having a hollowed back and the ability to drive people to suicide.
- In 1877, Swedish poet Viktor Rydberg published a poem titled "Skogsrået."
  - Between 1894 and 1895, Finnish composer Jean Sibelius composed a tone poem based on Rydberg's poem bearing the same title.
  - French Nordic folk group Skáld adapted Rydberg's poem for their 2022 single "Då Månen Sken."
- In the game Unforgiving: A Northern Hymn, a skogsrå roams the forest where she bites her victims and turns them into trees. Eventually Linn encounters the forest spirit and gets bitten. However, she manages to be free of the infection with the help of the Näcken.
- In the video game Bramble: The Mountain King, a skogsrå appears as a boss.
- Skogsra appears as a demon in multiple games of the Shin Megami Tensei series.
- In Nghi Vo's 2022 novel Siren Queen, Greta's character is a skogsra.
