= Melon heads =

American folklore beings

Melon Heads
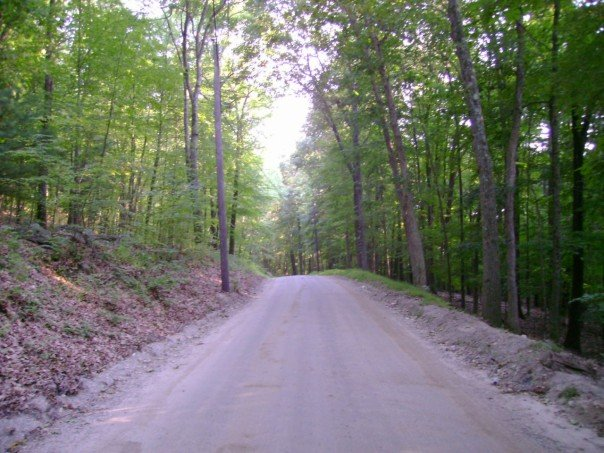
- Velvet Street, location of the Trumbull and Monroe Melon Head story

Origin
- Country: United States
- Region: Michigan, Ohio, Connecticut
- Details: Urban legend, hydrocephaly

In the American folklore of Ohio, Michigan and Connecticut, melon heads are beings generally described as large-headed humanoids with bulbous large craniums who occasionally emerge from hiding places to attack people. Different variations of the legend attribute different origins to the entities.

== Michigan ==
The melon heads of Michigan are said to reside around Felt Mansion, although they have also been reportedly seen in southern forested areas of Ottawa County. According to one story, they were originally children with hydrocephalus who lived at the Junction Insane Asylum near Felt Mansion.

The story explains that, after enduring physical and emotional abuse, they became feral and were released into the forests surrounding the asylum. The Allegan County Historical Society asserts that the asylum never existed, although it was at one point a prison; however, the story has been part of the local folklore for several decades. Laketown Township Manager Al Meshkin told the Holland Sentinel that he had heard the tales as a teenager, noting that his friends referred to the beings as "wobbleheads".

Some versions of the legend say that the children once lived in the mansion itself but later retreated to a system of caverns (or caves in a nearby hill left over from an abandoned zoo). Some versions of this legend say that the children devised a plan to escape and kill the doctor that abused them. It is said that the children had no place to hide the body, so they cut it up in small pieces which they hid around the mansion. Rumors exist that teenagers who had broken into the mansion saw ghosts of the children and claimed to see shadows of the doctor's murder through the light coming from an open door. The legend has spread throughout the region, even becoming the subject of a 2011 film simply titled The Melonheads, which is based around the West Michigan legend.

== Ohio ==
The melon head stories of Ohio are primarily associated with the Cleveland suburb of Kirtland in Lake County. According to local lore, the melon heads were originally orphans under the watch of a mysterious figure known as Dr. Crow (sometimes spelled Crowe, Krohe or Kroh or known as Dr. Melonhead). Crow is said to have performed unusual experiments on the children, who developed large, hairless heads and malformed bodies. Some accounts claim that the children were already suffering from hydrocephalus and that Crow injected even more fluid into their brains.

Eventually, the legend continues, the children killed Crow, burned the orphanage, and retreated to the surrounding forests and supposedly feed on babies. Legend holds that the melon heads may be sighted along Wisner Road in Kirtland and adjacent Chardon Township in Geauga County. The melon head legend has been popularized on the Internet, particularly on the websites Creepy Cleveland and DeadOhio, where users offer their own versions of the story. A movie, Legend of the Melonheads, released in 2010, is based on the Ohio legend and various other legends in the Kirtland area. In the 2018 horror anthology movie The Field Guide to Evil, featuring eight stories from cultures around the world, the contribution from the USA is a rendition of the Melonheads where a man's son is taken into the woods and turned into a Melonhead. The 2024 release The Melon Heads: House of Crow is based on the legend.

Research shows that Dr. Crow likely did not exist.

== Connecticut ==
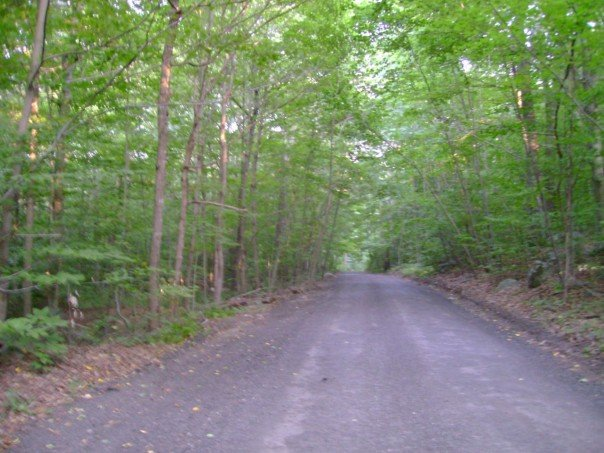
Saw Mill City Road is the dirt road where the Shelton Melon Heads supposedly lurk.

Several variations of the Melon Head legend can be found throughout Southwest Connecticut, especially in Southern Litchfield County, central and eastern Fairfield County and western New Haven County, Connecticut. In Fairfield County and Litchfield County, many tales can be found in communities such as Newtown, New Milford, Trumbull, Shelton, Stratford, Monroe, Easton and Weston. In western and central New Haven County tales can be found in towns like Seymour, Oxford, Milford, and Southbury.

There are several primary Connecticut variations. According to one variation of the myth, Fairfield County was the location of an asylum for the criminally insane that burned down in the fall of 1960, resulting in the death of all of the staff and most of the patients with 10 to 20 inmates unaccounted for, supposedly having survived and escaped to the woods. The legend states that the melon heads' appearance is the result of them having resorted to cannibalism in order to survive the harsh winters of the region and to inbreeding, which in turn caused them to develop hydrocephalus. Some retellings of this version substitute the asylum or prison with places of business or camp grounds and the inmates/patients with employees, staff or camp-goers. Individual variations will modify what town these individuals were originally from and where they end up.

According to the second variation, the melon heads are descendants of a Colonial-era family from Shelton-Trumbull who were banished after accusations of witchcraft were made against them causing them to retreat to the woods. As with the first version of this legend, this variation attributes the appearance of the melon heads to inbreeding. Melon Heads allegedly prey upon humans who wander into their territory. Like the first version, individual retellings will modify what town the family was originally from and where they end up.

=== Dracula Drive ===
A number of Connecticut-based legends of the melon heads have one characteristic in common: the inclusion of a secluded, rustic or single-lane (usually) dirt road running through the melon heads' wooded territory. Many towns in Fairfield County and New Haven County have rural and forested sections, and it is not uncommon for these forests to have rural roads running through them. These roads at times are associated with the local variation of the Melon Head legend and are said to be part of the Melon Heads' territory.

In a number of towns such as Newtown, New Milford, Shelton, Trumbull and Monroe, several legends place the melon heads' territory around a mysterious and mythical street commonly referred to as Dracula Drive. None of the towns that have a melon head legend have roads designated as Dracula Drive. Depending on what version of the legend is told, one of several existing streets are mistakenly referred to or coincidentally coincide with the Dracula Drive mentioned in the melon head stories. For instance, some legends place the melon heads' territory in and around Saw Mill City Road in Shelton as Dracula Drive. Some other roads mistakenly referred to as Dracula Drive include:

1. Edmonds Road in Oxford.
2. Velvet Street in Trumbull and Monroe. (Runs between Tashua Road in Trumbull and Judd Road in Monroe near the Easton border.)
3. Zion Hill Rd in Milford.
4. The roads around Lake Mohegan in Fairfield.
5. Marginal Road in New Haven.
6. Jeremy Swamp Road in Southbury.
7. Paths/roads in and around Roosevelt Forest in Stratford.

=== Inspirations and origins ===
Characteristics of the legend evolve and parts of various versions of the legend affect other parts/versions of the legend. For example, some legends claim the melon heads would bite or consume whoever entered their territory. Also, the Melon Heads' territory commonly involves a secluded, rustic or dirt road running through it. This is one instance where elements of the legend interact over time and why some actual streets are mistakenly referred to as Dracula Drive by some locals.

In Connecticut, some of the inspiration for a number of versions of the Melon Heads' legends may be attributed to the local surroundings and landmarks. Central Fairfield County is home to the now defunct Fairfield Hills State Mental Hospital as well as the Garner Correctional Institution, both located in Newtown. The care and treatment for adult male offenders with significant mental health issues throughout the Connecticut Department of Correction were consolidated at Garner CI. Also there is the Federal Correctional Institution located in nearby Danbury. This part of Fairfield County has historically been a rural area filled with farms and forests. The proximity of several criminal and psychiatric institutions as well as their juxtaposition to rural areas of the county may have contributed elements to the legend of the Melon Heads.

Stories about deformed country people who keep to themselves are common in legend. While the legend of the Melon Heads is more widely told throughout Southwest Connecticut, one of several other similar legends of deformed or mutated humans can be found in various locations of Fairfield and New Haven County. These legends have been told in overlapping communities where some individuals would tell versions of one legend alongside other individuals who would tell versions of another legend. Over time this overlapping of oral tradition may have allowed the cross-contribution of elements to each other. Some similar legends include:

1. The Danbury Frog People (commonly told in Danbury/Bethel).
2. The Faceless People of Monroe / The House of the Faceless People (commonly told in Monroe).
3. Mongoloid Village (commonly told in the communities of central and eastern New Haven County like North Branford).

== See also ==
- Pumpkinhead (film series)
- Mannegishi

=== Allegedly haunted cemeteries in South Western Connecticut ===
- Union Cemetery, Easton Connecticut
- Stepney Cemetery, Stepney (Monroe) Connecticut
- Gregory's Four Corners Burial Ground, Trumbull, Connecticut
- Great Hill Cemetery, Seymour, Connecticut
- Gunntown Cemetery, Naugatuck, Connecticut
