= Union Cemetery (Easton, Connecticut) =

Historic cemetery

Coordinates: 41.2727°N 73.297°W

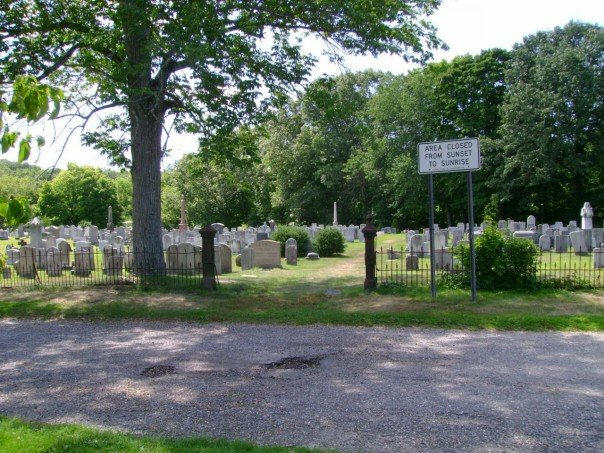
The entrance to Union Cemetery in 2007.

Union Cemetery is a cemetery located near Stepney Road in Easton, Connecticut. The site dates back to the 18th century.

== Reported hauntings ==
According to popular legends, the "White Lady" ghost haunts Union cemetery as well as Stepney Cemetery in Monroe. Like other White Lady ghost stories, Union Cemetery's ghost is described as wearing a white "diaphanous white nightgown or a wedding dress". Demonologist Ed Warren claimed to have seen the ghost and to have video of it. According to ghost hunters, it is one of the "most haunted" cemeteries in the entire United States.

== See also ==
- List of reportedly haunted locations in the United States
