= Webb Mountain Discovery Zone =

Park and outdoor learning center in Connecticut, United States

Coordinates: 41.3605°N 73.1705°W

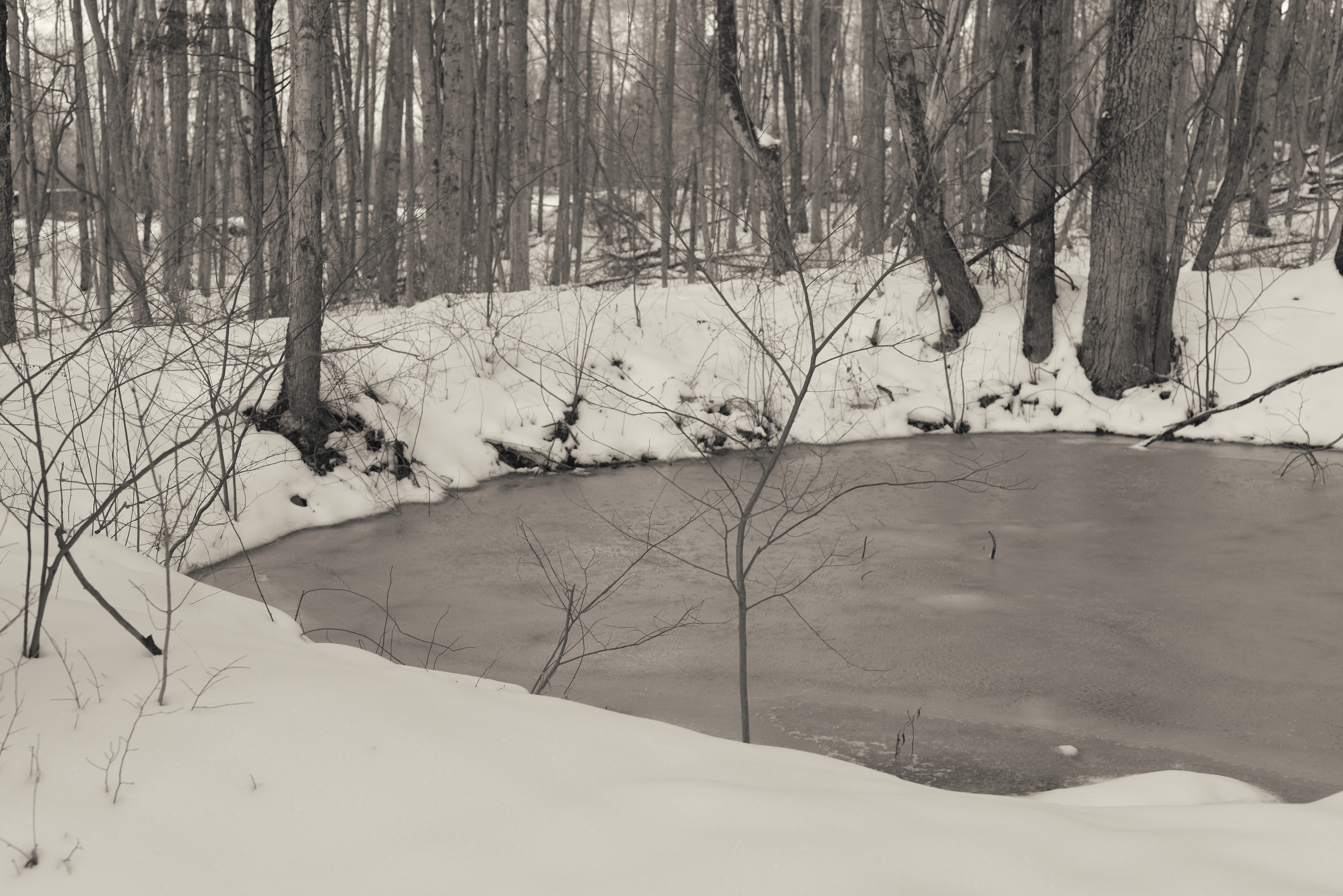
Classroom Court Pond by the Froggy Freeway Trail

The Webb Mountain Discovery Zone is a 170-acre park and outdoor learning center in Monroe, Connecticut, United States. The adjacent 135 acre Webb Mountain Park connects up to a 13.5-mile trail network.

The park covers 170 acres (0.69 km^{2}) and has 3 loop trails, each with marked interpretive signs. There is also an outdoor classroom for schools and groups, and a scavenger hunt scorecard. There are no other visitor facilities. The park provides additional educational resources for teachers, as well as programs for school groups, daycare centers, and scouts. The park is owned by the Town of Monroe and administered by the Friends of Webb Mountain. The park is currently under the direction of Tom Ellbogen.

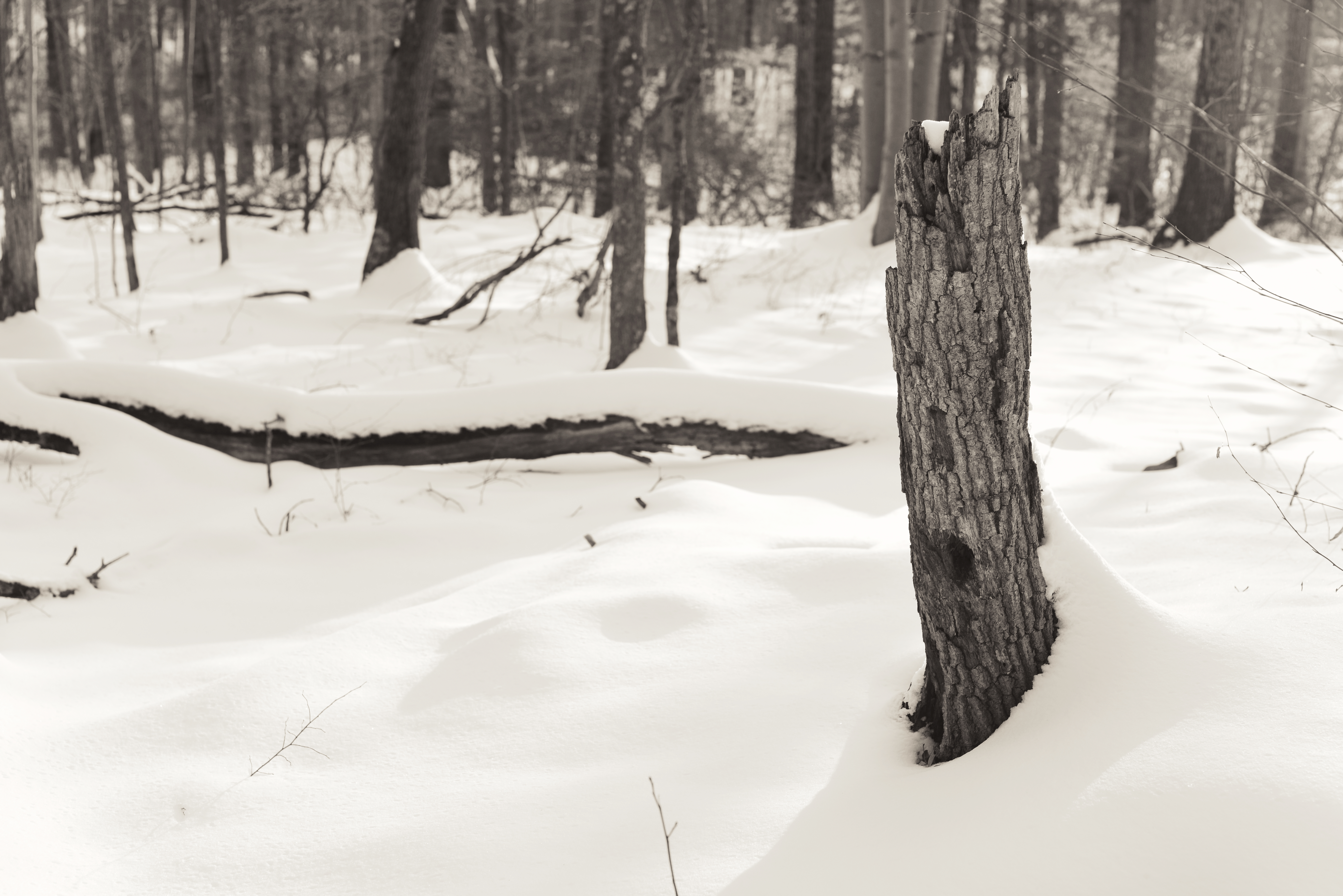
Webb Mountain Park is in Monroe, CT. The parking lot is located at 52 Webb Circle.

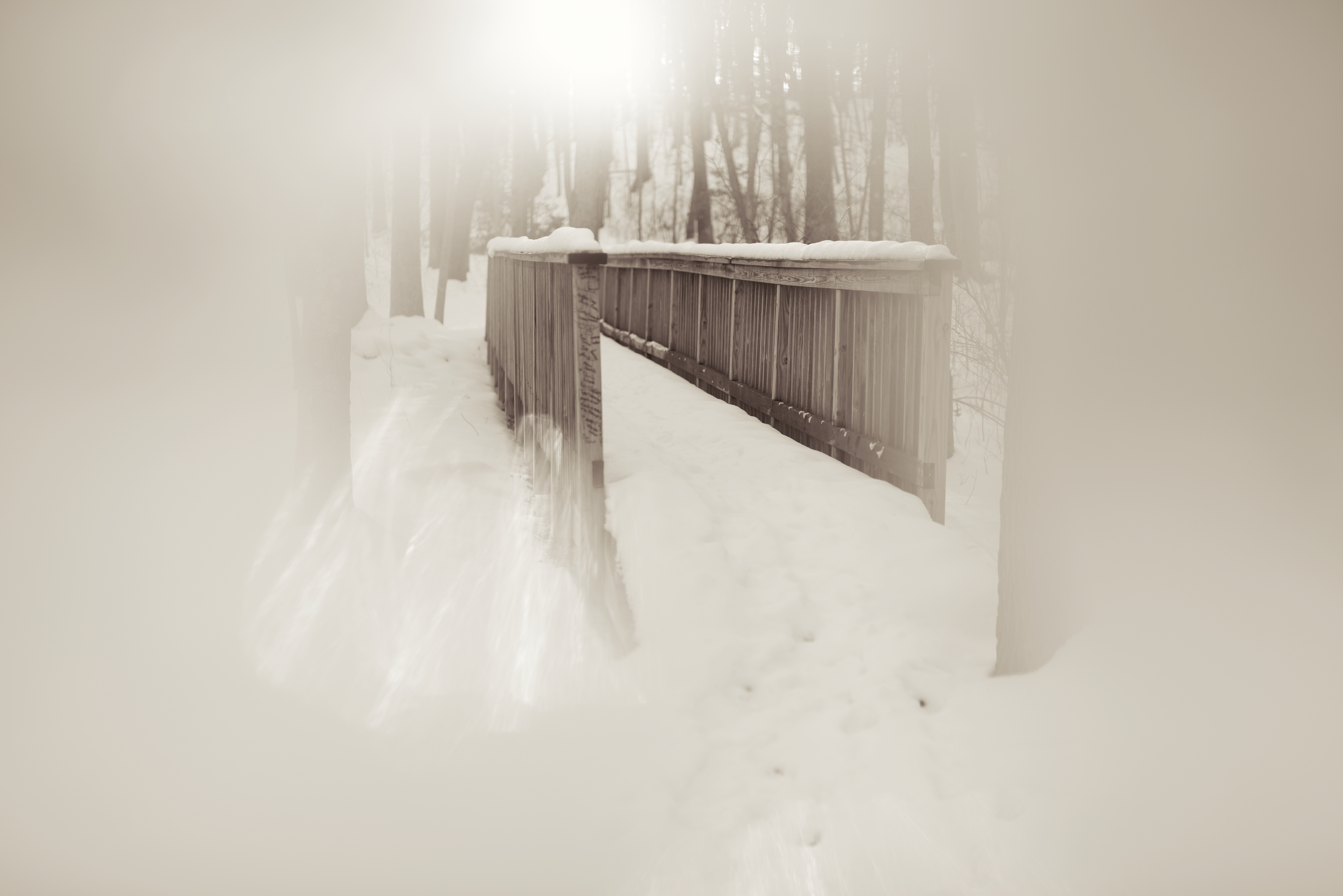
Webb Mountain Park Discovery Zone is on 171 acres. This bridge was completed by the Monroe Eagle Scouts in 2010.

== History ==
In 2004, the Town of Monroe, with help from the Connecticut Department of Environmental Protection (DEP), purchased 171 acres (0.69 km^{2}) of open space between Webb Mountain Park to the north and Aquarion Water Company property to the south. A comprehensive review of the property identified significant opportunities to leverage the land’s unique biodiversity including vernal pools, wildlife habitats, varietal forestation for educational purposes at several grade levels.

Under the guidance of Hank Gruner, Vice President of Programs at the new Connecticut Science Center in Hartford and Project Coordinator of the Connecticut Amphibian Monitoring Project, a second study that examined the wetland resources on the property to determine the extent and quality of the 11 active vernal pools.

With this information, the Monroe Conservation Commission, led by Tom Ellbogen, worked closely with Mr. Gruner, Diane Joy, Assistant Director of Parks, Connecticut DEP, and Monroe Schools Science Coordinator Bonnie Maur, to pilot an outdoor education program that utilizes the natural resources found on the site and conforming to the State of Connecticut’s science curriculum standards. A successful field test of two fourth grade classes was conducted in May 2007 by Mr. Gruner and his staff.

The Webb Mountain Discovery Zone was officially opened to the public in October, 2007. Private funding was used to develop a comprehensive interpretive trail system with interpretive signs and a self-directed scavenger hunt, created by Mr. Gruner, centered on the theme of “How People and Animals Have Used the Land - Past and Present,” using the highest quality signage and eco-friendly materials. Twenty-eight learning stations covering subjects such as rocks and minerals, plants and wildlife, ecology, biology, and Native American and Colonial history were identified and developed by Mr. Gruner and Nick Bellantoni, Connecticut State Archeologist. The construct of the park, including installing all signs and benches and creating a comprehensive trail system spanning over 4 miles (6.4 km), was completed almost exclusively by volunteers.

== Trails ==
Webb Mountain Discovery Zone has 3 marked trail loops.

- Loop #1 is 1.1 miles (1.8 km) long, with highlights including a 19th-century quarry and a 19th-century kiln.
- Loop #2 is 1.8 miles (2.9 km) long, and goes past ponds and hayfields, as well as stand of mountain laurel and birch.
- Loop #3 is 1.6 miles (2.6 km) long and passes a large vernal pool.

== Programs and activities ==
In addition to being open for hikes and exploration, the park sponsors numerous activities, including an annual Spring Egg Hunt. Classes of all ages visit from local public schools. It is also a site for Connecticut Trails Day guided hikes.

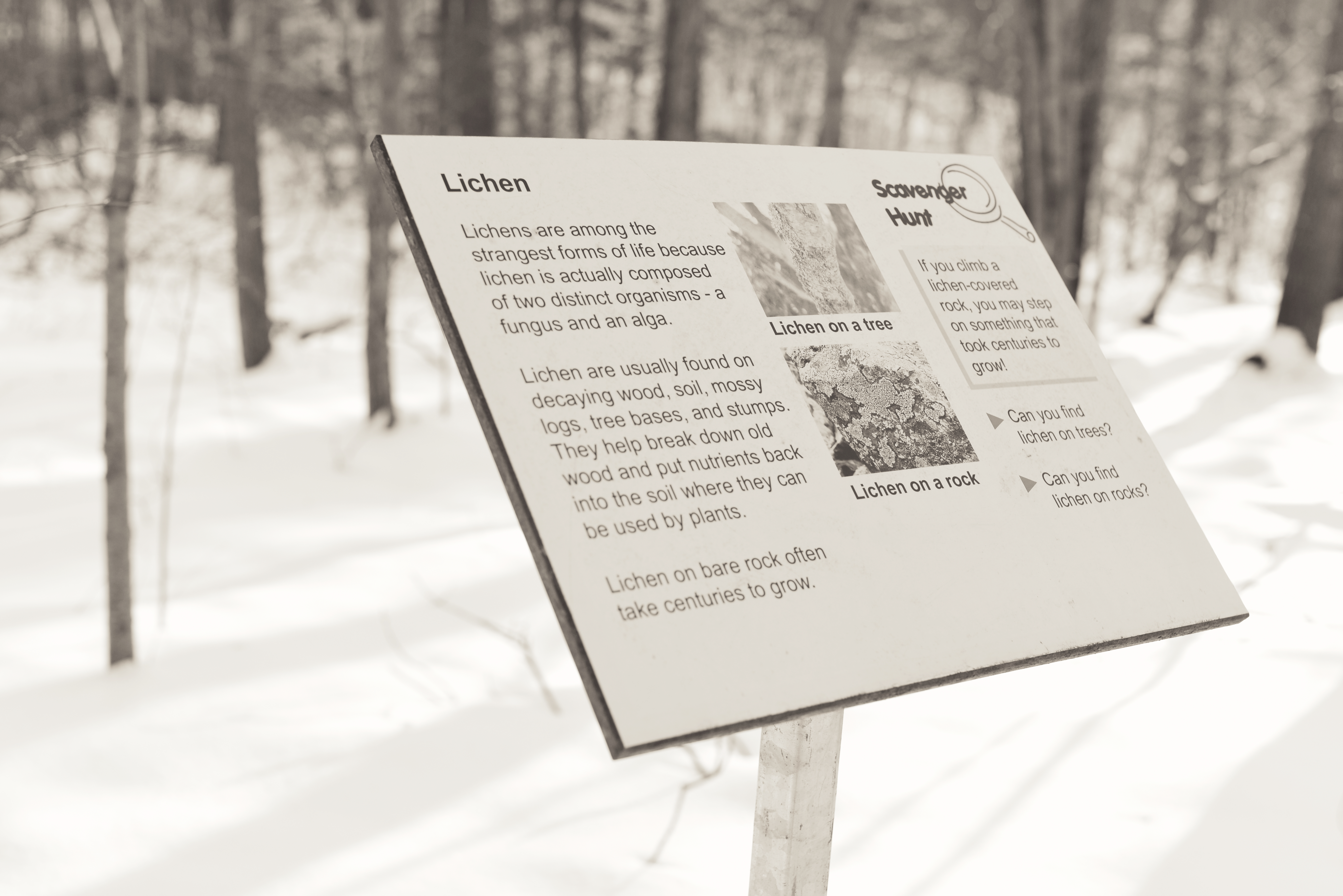
Webb Mountain Park, Lichen info sign.

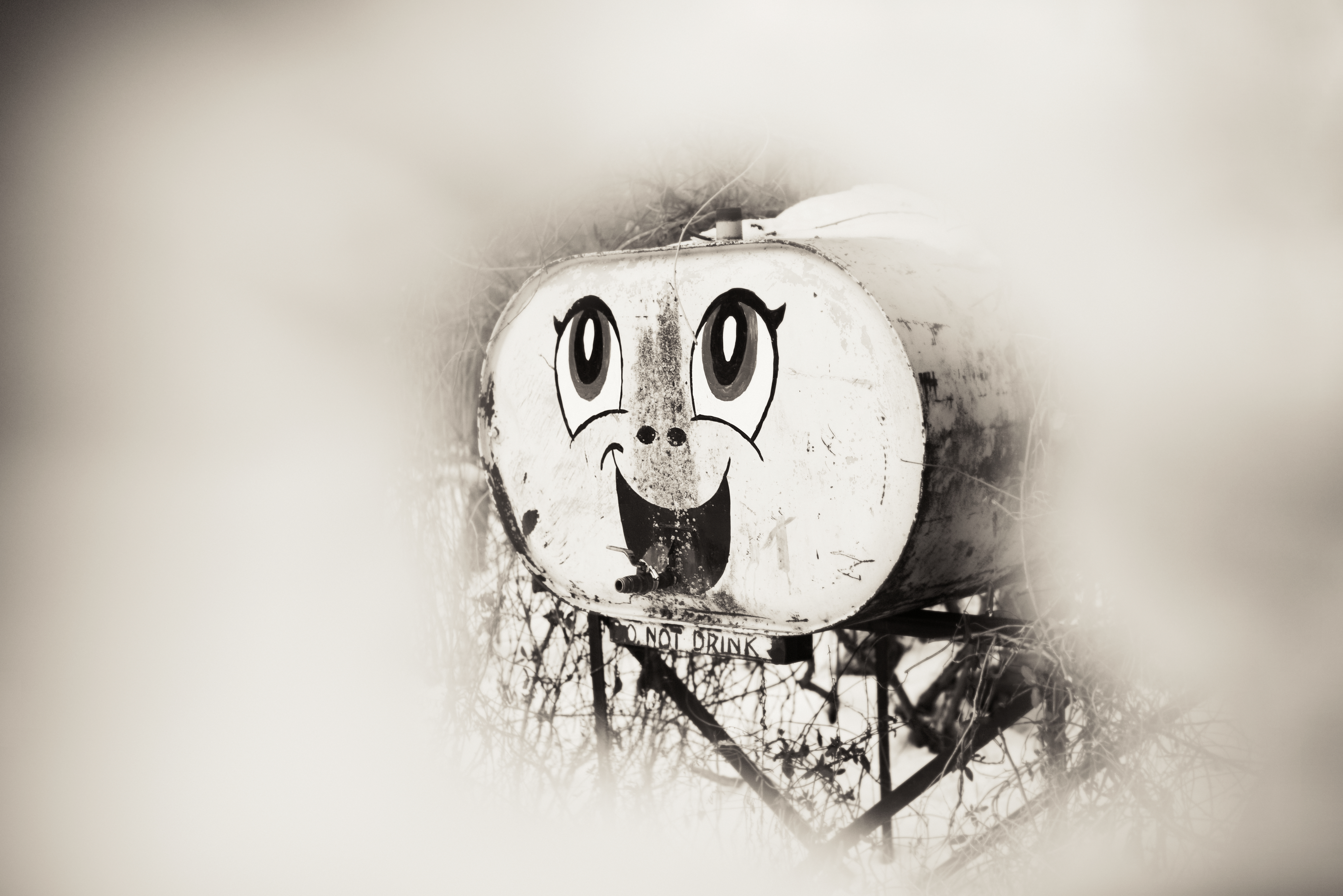
http://www.monroerec.org/info/facilities/details.aspx?FacilityID=13017 Near the entrance of Webb Mountain Park, winter 2016.

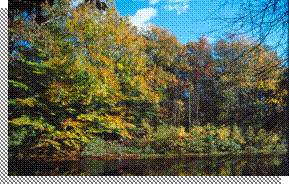
Knecht Pond
