= Collinsville Formation =

Geologic formation in Connecticut, United States

The Collinsville Formation is a geologic formation in the U.S. state of Connecticut. It is a metamorphic rock formation from the Middle Ordovician epoch. The U.S. Geological Survey description includes that its "most complete sequence is in Shelburne Falls dome where L.M. Hall has recognized seven mappable subdivisions. With minor modification, they are (ascending) 1) amphibolite with thin felsic gneiss layers; 2) rusty-weathering massive granulites; 3) very homogeneous garnetiferous biotite gneiss; 4) interlayered amphibolite and felsic gneiss; 5) felsic gneiss with scattered biotite +/-magnetite, garnet, and hornblende; 6) interbedded amphibolite and white felsic gneiss; and 7) gray, tan-weathering granulites containing thin coticule layers."

Rock climbers use one of its features in Webb Mountain Park in Monroe, Connecticut.
