= Great Hollow Lake =

- Location within Connecticut Location within the United States
- Location: Monroe, Connecticut, United States
- Coordinates: 41°18′40″N 73°14′47″W
- Type: artificial lake
- Basin countries: United States
- Surface area: 16 acres (6.5 ha)

Great Hollow Lake is approximately 16 acres (65,000 m^{2}) in size and is a part of William E. Wolfe Park, located in Monroe, Connecticut. The lake includes a trout park with approximately 700 feet (210 m) of beach and facilities. Fishing, swimming and non-motorized boating are all permitted.
