= Monroe Center Historic District =

Historic district in Connecticut

- U.S. National Register of Historic Places
- U.S. Historic district
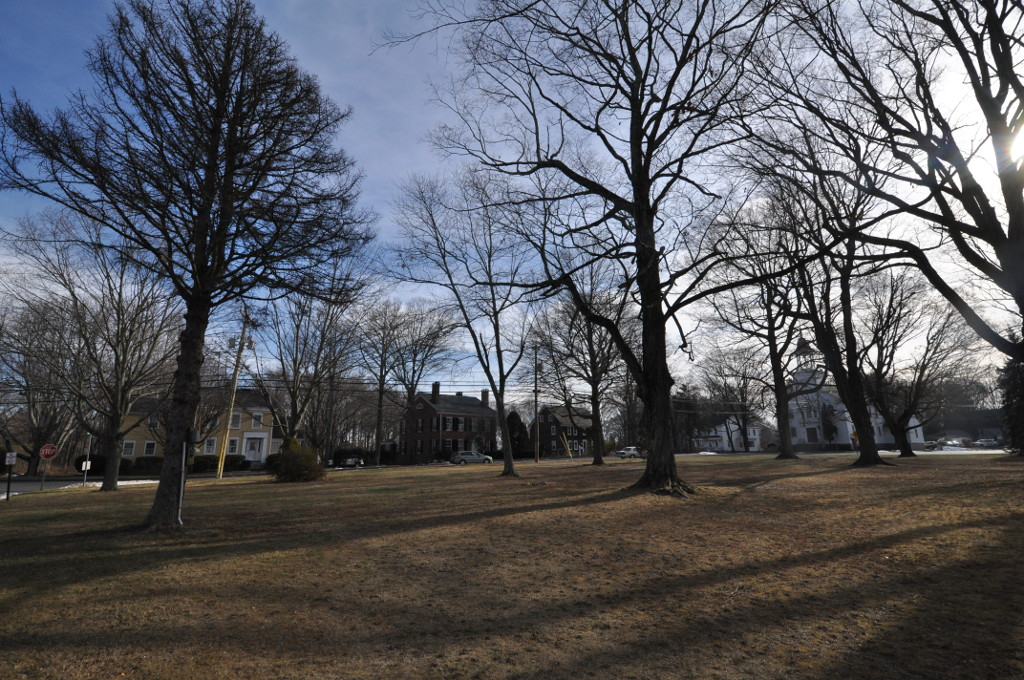
- View across the town green to houses and a church, 2016

- Location within Connecticut Location within the United States
- Location: CT 110 and CT 111, Monroe, Connecticut
- Coordinates: 41°19′57″N 73°12′26″W
- Area: 120 acres (49 ha)
- Built: 1762
- Architectural style: Colonial Revival, Georgian, Federal
- NRHP reference No.: 77001392
- Added to NRHP: August 19, 1977

The Monroe Center Historic District is a 120-acre (49 ha) historic district in Monroe, Connecticut with significance dating to 1762. It was listed on the National Register of Historic Places in 1977.

It includes about 60 significant buildings, including Federal style St. Peters Church at the south end of the Monroe Center green. On June 30, 1781, a dance was held on the green for about 600 French Army troops serving under General Rochambeau; they were camped nearby during their march towards Yorktown, Virginia which led to American independence.

== See also ==
- March Route of Rochambeau's army
- List of historic sites preserved along Rochambeau's route
- National Register of Historic Places listings in Fairfield County, Connecticut
