= East Village, Connecticut =

Census-designated place in Connecticut, United States

- Census-designated place
- Location within Connecticut Location within the United States
- Coordinates: 41°21′30″N 73°11′12″W
- Country: United States
- State: Connecticut
- County: Fairfield
- Town: Monroe

Area
  - Total: 6.66 sq mi (17.25 km^{2})
  - Land: 6.51 sq mi (16.85 km^{2})
  - Water: 0.15 sq mi (0.40 km^{2})
- Elevation: 425 ft (130 m)
- Time zone: UTC-5 (Eastern (EST))
  - Summer (DST): UTC-4 (EDT)
- ZIP Code: 06468 (Monroe)
- Area codes: 203/475
- FIPS code: 09-24520
- GNIS feature ID: 2805941

East Village is a census-designated place (CDP) in the town of Monroe, Fairfield County, Connecticut, United States. It occupies the northeastern end of the town of Monroe, extending northeast to the Housatonic River (the town border with Oxford) and southwest to Walnut Street. It is bordered to the southeast by the city of Shelton and to the northwest by the town of Newtown.

As of the 2020 census, East Village had a population of 4,057.

== Demographics ==
=== 2020 census ===
East Village was first listed as a CDP prior to the 2020 census. As of the 2020 census, East Village had a population of 4,057. The median age was 45.0 years. 21.8% of residents were under the age of 18 and 19.6% of residents were 65 years of age or older. For every 100 females there were 101.1 males, and for every 100 females age 18 and over there were 100.1 males age 18 and over.

78.5% of residents lived in urban areas, while 21.5% lived in rural areas.

There were 1,422 households in East Village, of which 36.2% had children under the age of 18 living in them. Of all households, 72.2% were married-couple households, 9.4% were households with a male householder and no spouse or partner present, and 15.9% were households with a female householder and no spouse or partner present. About 17.3% of all households were made up of individuals and 11.2% had someone living alone who was 65 years of age or older.

There were 1,463 housing units, of which 2.8% were vacant. The homeowner vacancy rate was 0.8% and the rental vacancy rate was 0.0%.

Racial composition as of the 2020 census
Race	Number	Percent
White	3,450	85.0%
Black or African American	102	2.5%
American Indian and Alaska Native	1	0.0%
Asian	124	3.1%
Native Hawaiian and Other Pacific Islander	1	0.0%
Some other race	76	1.9%
Two or more races	303	7.5%
Hispanic or Latino (of any race)	298	7.3%
