= Webb Mountain Park =

Park in Connecticut

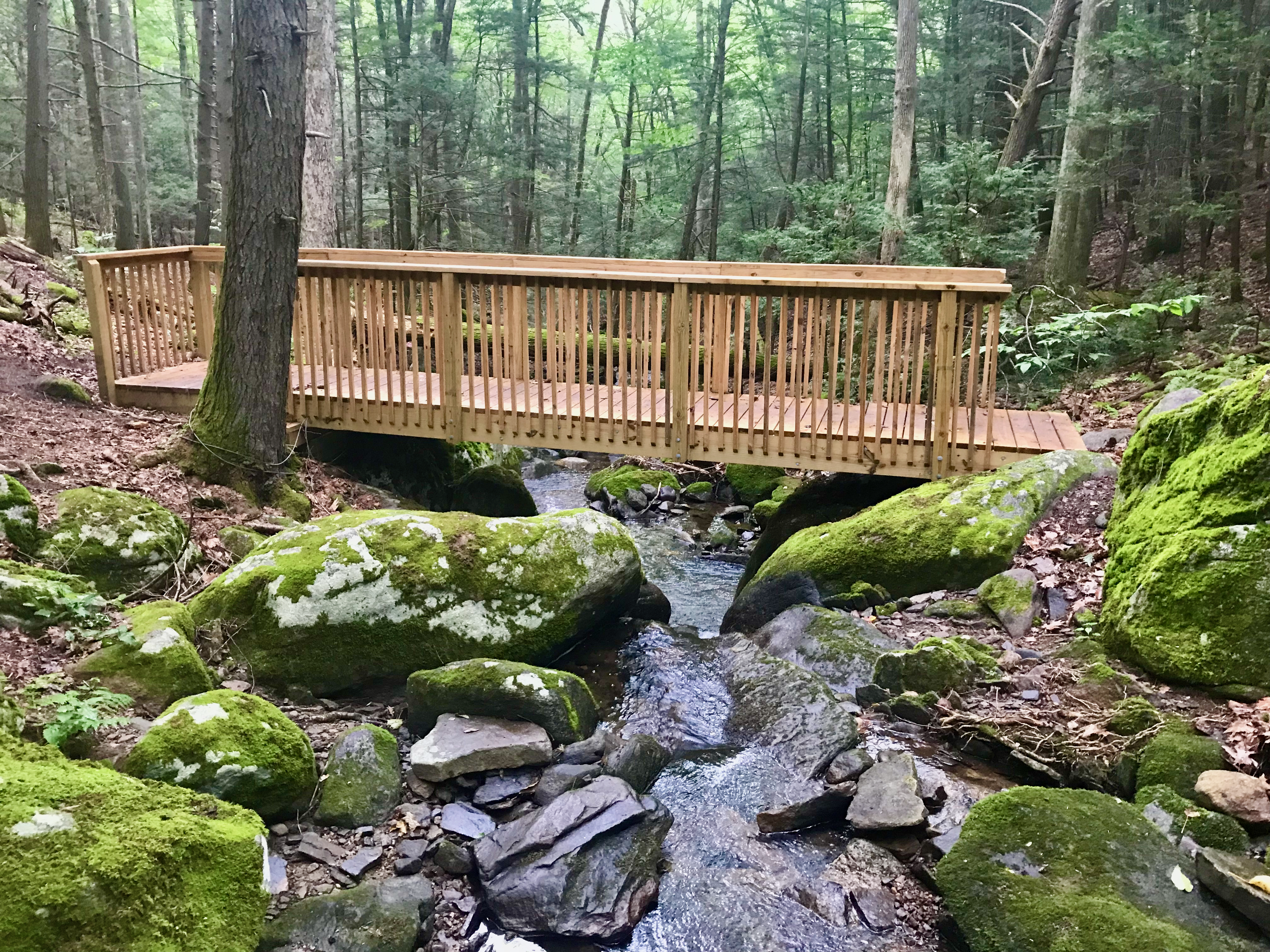
- Paugussett Trail footbridge over Round Hill Brook in Webb Mountain Park, Monroe CT.

- Location within Connecticut
- Location: Monroe, Connecticut, United States
- Coordinates: 41.3749°N 73.1632°W
- Area: 135 acres (55 ha)
- Established: 1974
- Governing body: Monroe, CT
- Operator: Town of Monroe, CT Parks and Recreation Department
- Owner: Monroe, CT
- Administrator: Town of Monroe, CT Parks and Recreation Department

Webb Mountain Park is a 135-acre municipal park in Monroe, Connecticut, offering hiking trails, rock climbing, nature study, and campsites. The park backs up onto land where a historic castle building and residences for nuns are located. Webb Mountain Discovery Zone nature center with its own 170 acre park is adjacent. The park has diverse flora including numerous kinds of trees, shrubs, and ferns that not only add to the aesthetic value of the place but provide an ideal setting for some amateur as well as scientific study of the local plants. It is adjacent to the town-owned Webb Mountain Discovery Zone.

== History ==
Webb Mountain Park was a farm owned by Mr. and Mrs. Alfred E. Wagner, purchased by the Town of Monroe in 1972.

A 1979 study evaluated lands surrounding the park and in 2004, 170 acres of property adjacent were purchased by the town. In 2005, a study titled Webb Mountain Park Extension was carried out on the surrounding lands The adjacent property became Discovery Zone park. Several acres were also added to Webb Mountain Park as part of the deal. The 100-acre Aquarion watershed property is also adjacent to the parks. The park borders the Housatonic River and is adjacent to the Stevenson Dam and Lake Zoar, the fifth-largest lake in Connecticut. Trails in the park join with the Connecticut Forrest and Park Associations Paugussett Trail.

== Flora ==
The trees found here include eastern hemlock (Tsuga canadensis), eastern black oak (Quercus velutina), red maple (Acer rubrum), sugar maple (Acer saccharum), shagbark hickory (Carya ovata), tree of heaven (Ailanthus altissima), flowering dogwood (Cornus florida) and tulip tree (Liriodendron tulipifera). There are also herbs such as Hepatica americana and Indian pipe (Monotropa uniflora).

== Rock climbing ==
The park is a site of rock climbing, on its Collinsville Formation rock, predominantly schist with layers of amphibolite and gneiss. The park connects up with a 13.5-mile trail network. It also has several marked side trails. It is dog friendly.

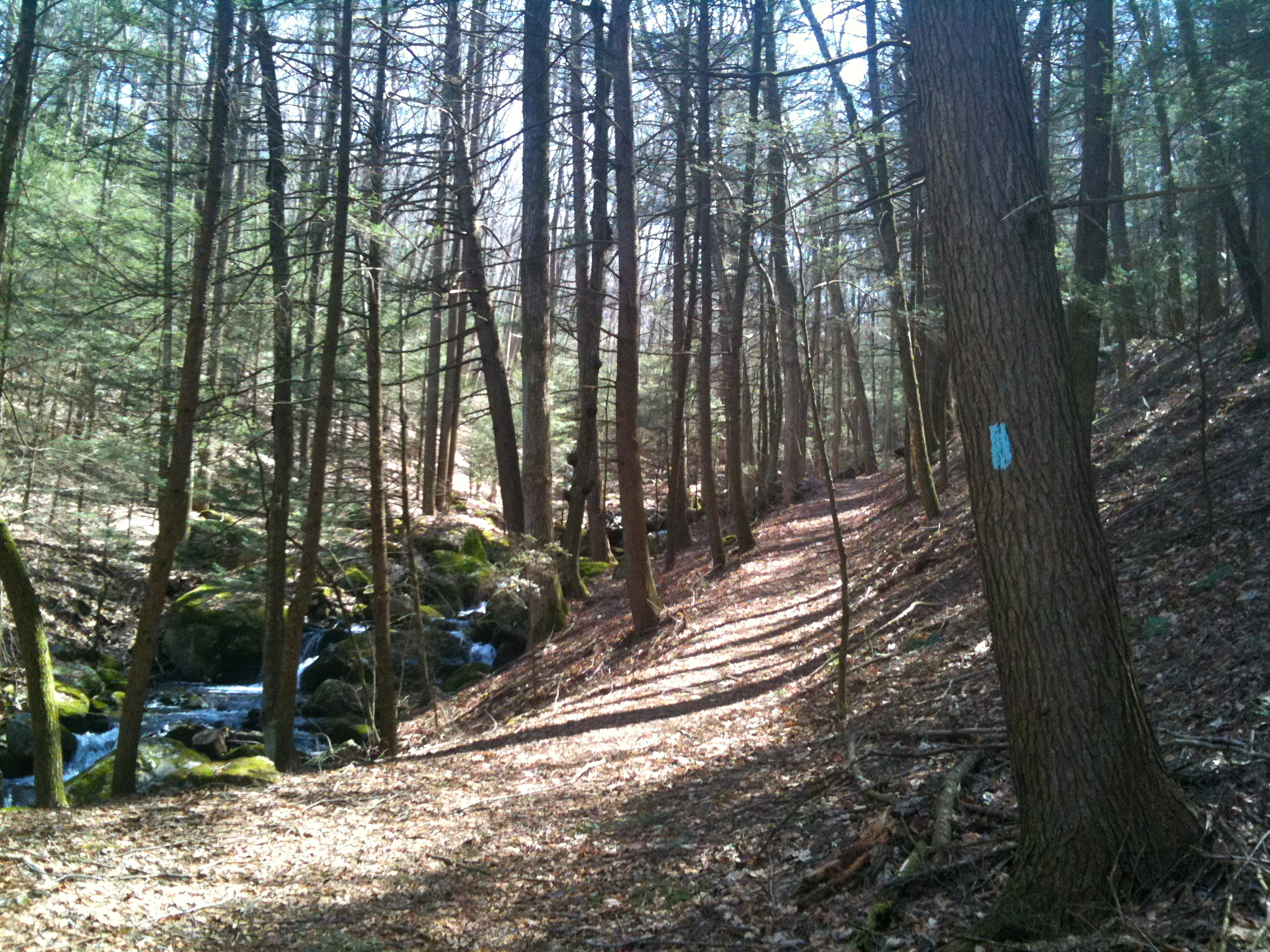
Paugussett Trail in Webb Mountain Park

== Hiking and camping ==
The park is traversed by the Paugussett Trail and contains a number of side trails. Camping is allowed in the park.
