= Stepney Cemetery =

Historic cemetery in Monroe, Connecticut

Coordinates: 41.3224°N 73.2630°W

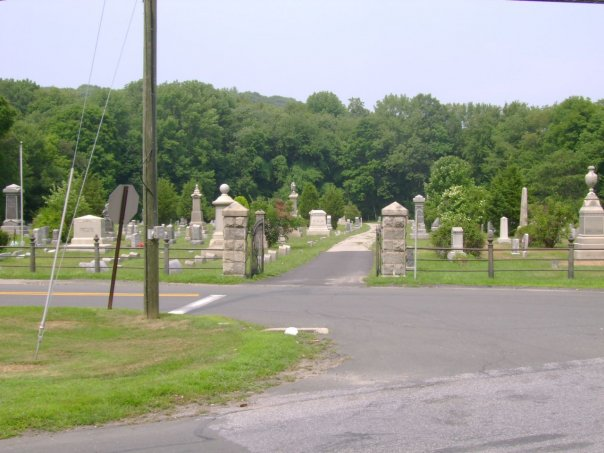
The entrance to Stepney Cemetery in 2007

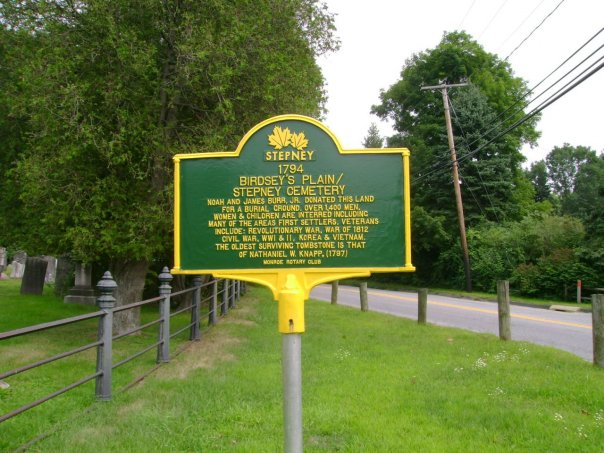
Stepney Cemetery in 2007

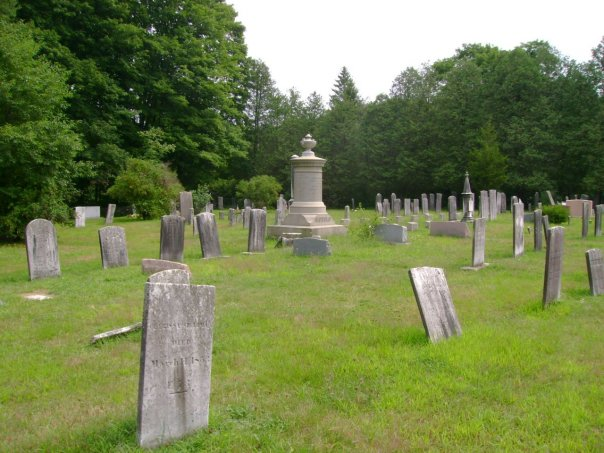
Stepney Cemetery in 2007

Stepney Cemetery is an old cemetery in Monroe, Connecticut, United States, located in the village of Stepney. It was established next to the Stepney Green in 1794. Many of the area's earliest settlers are buried in the cemetery; the oldest headstone belongs to Nathaniel W. Knapp (died 1787). The cemetery is also known as Birdsey's Plain Cemetery or Beardsley Plain Cemetery. Next to the cemetery is Our Lady of The Rosary Chapel.

Ed and Lorraine Warren are buried in this cemetery.

== Alleged haunting ==
Ed and Lorraine Warren believed that the cemetery was haunted by a "White Lady ghost".
