= Stepney, Connecticut =

Census-designated place in Connecticut, United States

Coordinates: 41°18′15.0″N 73°15′15.5″W

- Census-designated place
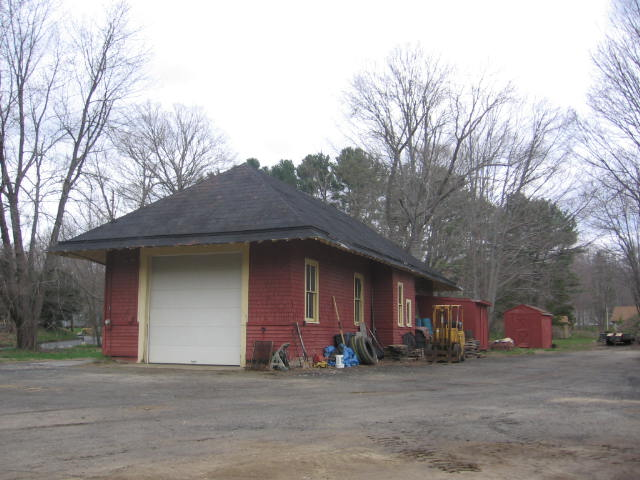
- Former Stepney railroad station

- Seal
- Interactive map of Stepney, Connecticut
- Country: United States
- State: Connecticut
- County: Fairfield
- Town: Monroe

Area
  - Land: 8.50 sq mi (22.01 km^{2})

Population (2020)
  - Total: 5,583
  - Density: 658.5/sq mi (254.2/km^{2})
- Time zone: UTC-5:00 (Eastern)
  - Summer (DST): UTC-4:00 (Eastern)
- Area code: 203

Stepney, also referred to as Stepney Village and Upper Stepney, is a district of the town of Monroe, Connecticut, United States and is on the Connecticut State Register of Historic Places. As of the 2020 census, Stepney had a population of 4,280. Consisting of approximately 8 square miles (21 km^{2}), Stepney extends from the Trumbull town line, along Route 25, to the Newtown town line. It was listed as a census-designated place prior to the 2020 census.

First settled circa 1720, Stepney was originally a productive farming community made up of transplants from settlements to the south such as Fairfield and Stratford. In the early 19th century, Stepney became a transportation hub for travelers going to and from the city of Danbury and the Greater Bridgeport areas as travelers followed the Bridgeport and Newtown Turnpike, the first paved road in the town of Monroe, and along Hattertown Road.

Once a depot for the Housatonic Railroad, and home to the town of Monroe's first fire department, the Stepney Volunteer Fire Department, today Stepney is home to over a dozen historic buildings dating from before the 20th century, and is predominantly a suburban community with the majority of its business located along the Route 25 corridor.

== Demographics ==
=== 2020 census ===
As of the 2020 census, Stepney had a population of 4,280. The median age was 45.3 years. 20.6% of residents were under the age of 18 and 18.2% of residents were 65 years of age or older. For every 100 females there were 92.7 males, and for every 100 females age 18 and over there were 90.0 males age 18 and over.

85.7% of residents lived in urban areas, while 14.3% lived in rural areas.

There were 1,672 households in Stepney, of which 31.1% had children under the age of 18 living in them. Of all households, 55.9% were married-couple households, 14.5% were households with a male householder and no spouse or partner present, and 24.9% were households with a female householder and no spouse or partner present. About 24.0% of all households were made up of individuals and 11.1% had someone living alone who was 65 years of age or older.

There were 1,734 housing units, of which 3.6% were vacant. The homeowner vacancy rate was 0.9% and the rental vacancy rate was 3.2%.

Racial composition as of the 2020 census
| Race | Number | Percent |
|---|---|---|
| White | 3,568 | 83.4% |
| Black or African American | 98 | 2.3% |
| American Indian and Alaska Native | 8 | 0.2% |
| Asian | 158 | 3.7% |
| Native Hawaiian and Other Pacific Islander | 0 | 0.0% |
| Some other race | 106 | 2.5% |
| Two or more races | 342 | 8.0% |
| Hispanic or Latino (of any race) | 370 | 8.6% |
