= Monroe, Connecticut =

Town in Connecticut, United States

- Town
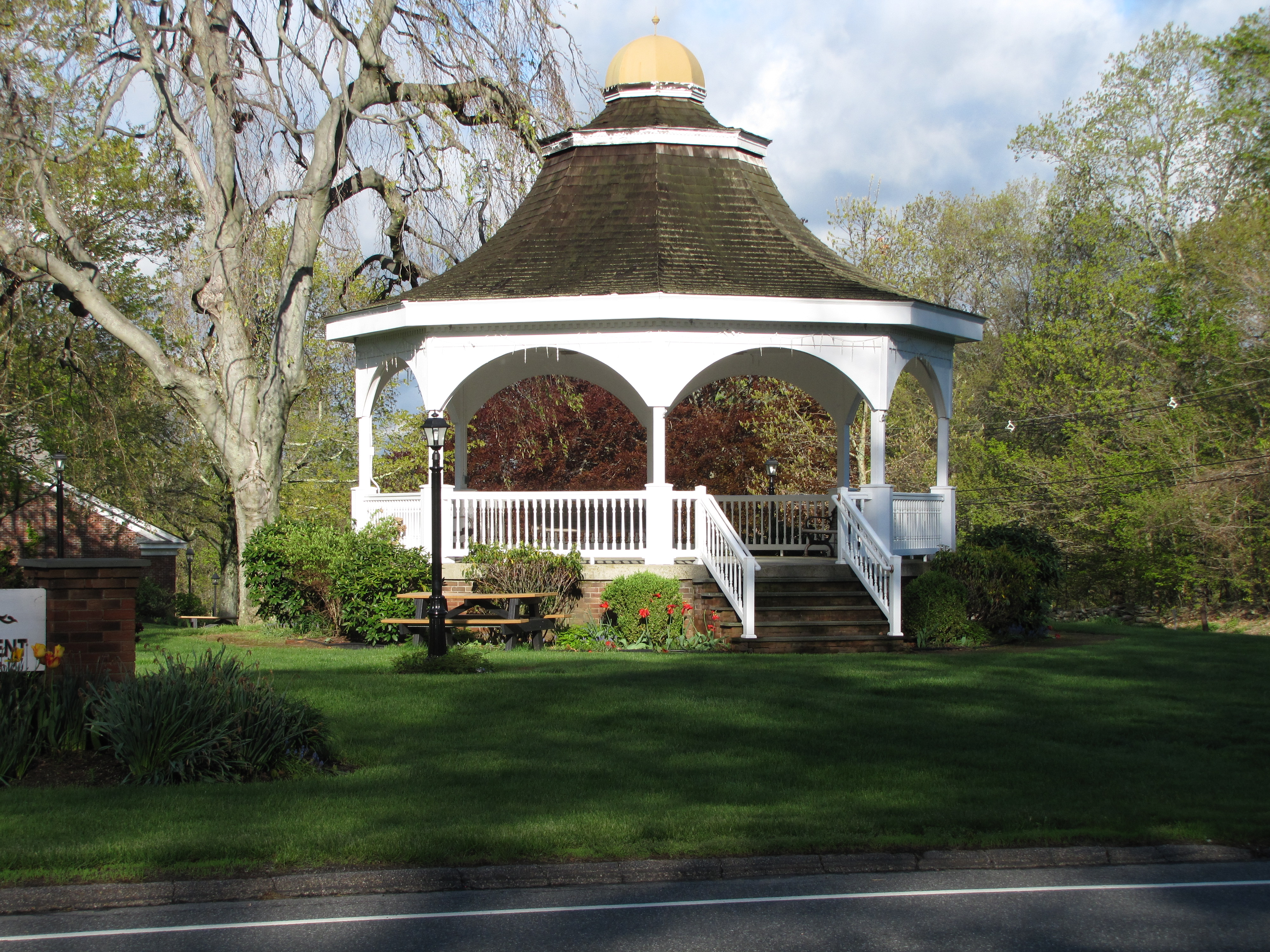
- Gazebo in front of town hall

- Seal

- Coordinates: 41°20′10″N 73°13′33″W
- Country: United States
- U.S. state: Connecticut
- County: Fairfield
- Region: CT Metropolitan
- Settled: 1671
- incorporated: 1823

Government
  - Type: Selectman-town council
  - First Selectman: Terrence P. Rooney
  - Town Council: Town Council members: Jonathan Formichella, Chairman; Enid Lipeles, Vice Chair; Vincent Duva; Cathy Kohut; Jason Maur; Sean O'Rourke; Janice Persico; Kevin Reid; Dona-Lyn Wales

Area
  - Total: 26.3 sq mi (68.1 km^{2})
  - Land: 26.1 sq mi (67.7 km^{2})
  - Water: 0.19 sq mi (0.5 km^{2})
- Elevation: 522 ft (159 m)

Population (2020)
  - Total: 18,825
  - Density: 721.3/sq mi (278.5/km^{2})
- Time zone: UTC−5 (Eastern)
  - Summer (DST): UTC−4 (Eastern)
- ZIP Code: 06468
- Area codes: 203/475
- FIPS code: 09-48620
- GNIS feature ID: 0213463
- Website: www.monroect.gov

Monroe is a town located in eastern Fairfield County, Connecticut, United States. The population was 18,825 at the 2020 census. Monroe is part of the Greater Bridgeport Planning Region.

The town is largely considered a bedroom community of New York City, New Haven, Stamford and Bridgeport.

Monroe contains the villages of Stepney, Stevenson and Monroe Center.

== History ==
On May 15, 1656, the Court of the Colony of Connecticut in Hartford affirmed that the town of Stratford included all of the territory 12 miles (19 km) inland from Long Island Sound, between the Housatonic River and the Fairfield town line, to include the southern portion of present-day Monroe. In 1662, Stratford selectmen Lt. Joseph Judson, Captain Joseph Hawley and John Minor secured all the written deeds of transfer from the Golden Hill Paugussett Indian Nation for this vast territory that comprises the present-day towns of Trumbull, Shelton and Monroe. In 1671, Stratford purchased from the Paugusset Indians the territory which included the remainder of the northern portions of Monroe, Trumbull and Shelton, in what is known as "The White Hills Purchase", and officially annexed it to the Township of Stratford.

Monroe incorporated as a town in 1823. The community is named after James Monroe, fifth President of the United States.

On August 18, 2024, the town suffered from flash flooding due to torrential rainfall, causing road destruction and leaving many stranded. This included the Route 34 bridge near the Lake Zoar Drive-In getting washed away completely, which left the road closed for an extended period of time.

== Geography ==
According to the United States Census Bureau, the town has a total area of 26.3 square miles (68 km^{2}), of which 26.1 square miles (68 km^{2}) is land and 0.2 square miles (0.52 km^{2}), or 0.76%, is water. The Pequonnock River begins in Monroe in Wolfe Park. Monroe borders Lake Zoar, a reservoir on the Housatonic River formed by the Stevenson Dam.

=== Neighborhoods ===
Monroe is made up of several neighborhoods:

- East Village
- Midtown
- Monroe Center
- North Central
- Stepney
- Stevenson
- Upper Stepney
- Whitney Farms
- Zoar

== Demographics ==
Historical population
Census	Pop.	Note	%±
1830	1,522		—
1840	1,351		−11.2%
1850	1,442		6.7%
1860	1,382		−4.2%
1870	1,226		−11.3%
1880	1,157		−5.6%
1890	994		−14.1%
1900	1,043		4.9%
1910	1,002		−3.9%
1920	1,161		15.9%
1930	1,221		5.2%
1940	1,728		41.5%
1950	2,892		67.4%
1960	6,402		121.4%
1970	12,047		88.2%
1980	14,010		16.3%
1990	16,896		20.6%
2000	19,247		13.9%
2010	19,479		1.2%
2020	18,825		−3.4%
2021 (est.)	18,764		−0.3%
U.S. Decennial Census

As of the 2020 United States census, there were 18,825 people living in the town. The racial makeup of the town was 84.6% White, 2.4% African American, 6.2% Asian, and 4.9% from two or more races. Hispanic or Latino people of any race were 6.8% of the population.

As of the census of 2000, there were 19,247 people, 6,481 households, and 5,346 families residing in the town. The population density was 736.5 inhabitants per square mile (284.4/km^{2}). There were 6,601 housing units at an average density of 252.6 per square mile (97.5/km^{2}). The racial makeup of the town was 95.8% White, 0.20% African American, 0.08% Native American, 2.62% Asian, 0.50% from other races, and 0.83% from two or more races. Hispanic or Latino people of any race were 2.20% of the population.

There were 6,481 households, out of which 42.5% had children under the age of 18 living with them, 74.0% were married couples living together, 6.0% had a female householder with no husband present, and 17.5% were non-families. Of all households, 14.9% were made up of individuals, and 6.6% had someone living alone who was 65 years of age or older. The average household size was 2.96 and the average family size was 3.31.

In the town, the population was spread out, with 29.1% under the age of 18, 4.8% from 18 to 24, 29.9% from 25 to 44, 25.7% from 45 to 64, and 10.5% who were 65 years of age or older. The median age was 38 years. For every 100 females, there were 96.5 males. For every 100 females age 18 and over, there were 93.5 males.

The median income for a household in the town was $85,000 and the median income for a family was $92,514. Males had a median income of $61,109 versus $41,572 for females. The per capita income for the town was $34,161. About 1.8% of families and 2.6% of the population were below the poverty line, including 2.6% of those under age 18 and 5.5% of those age 65 or over.

== Arts and culture ==
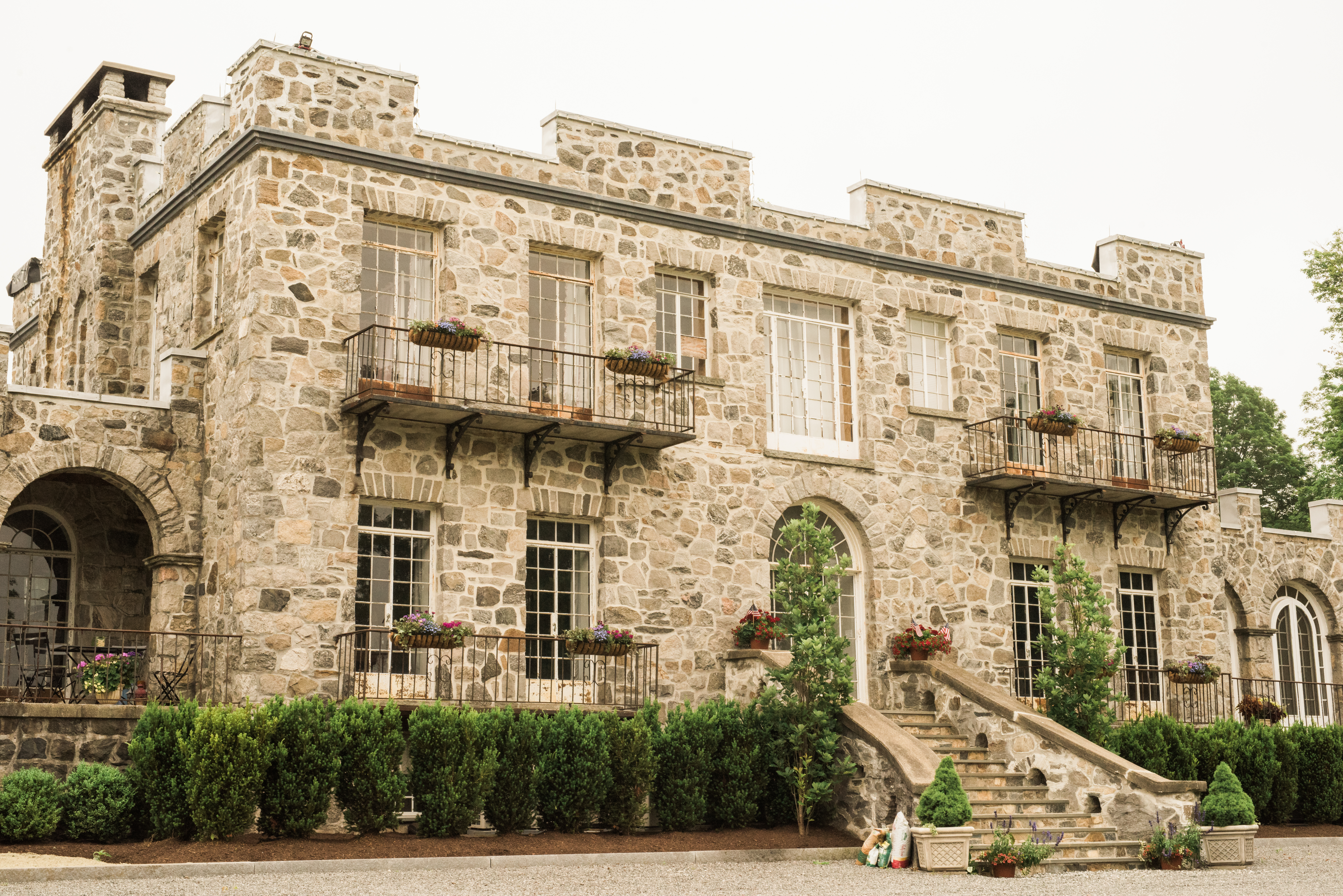
Sisters of the Holy Family of Nazareth.

=== Notable locations ===
- Stepney Cemetery, founded in 1794 and located near the Stepney Green
- Monroe Green, a private park in Monroe Center bordered by churches and municipal buildings.
- The Warrens' Occult Museum, a collection of occult artifacts
- Village Square Shopping Center, former venue for the Classic Nights Car Club.

=== Locations on the National Register of Historic Places ===
- Daniel Basset House – 1024 Monroe Turnpike (added September 23, 2002)
- Monroe Center Historic District – CT 110 and CT 111 (added September 19, 1977)
- Stevenson Dam Hydroelectric Plant – CT 34 (added October 29, 2000)
- Thomas Hawley House – 514 Purdy Hill Road (added May 11, 1980)

== Government ==
Monroe is a stalwart Republican town at the presidential level with the longest streak of supporting the GOP in Fairfield County. No Democrat has won the town in over 60 years. Lyndon B. Johnson came the closest in his landslide victory in 1964, having lost the town by only 17 votes to Barry M. Goldwater. It is the only municipality in Fairfield County (and one of only four statewide) that voted for Goldwater and subsequently voted for Donald Trump in all three of his elections.

Presidential elections results

Monroe town vote by party in presidential elections
Year	Democratic	Republican	Third Parties
2024	46.6% 5,346	51.9% 5,961	1.50% 175
2020	48.64% 5,838	49.90% 5,989	1.46% 175
2016	41.44% 4,520	54.29% 5,922	4.27% 466
2012	43.02% 4,446	55.70% 5,757	1.28% 132
2008	46.41% 5,133	52.58% 5,815	1.00% 111
2004	40.73% 4,349	58.02% 6,195	1.25% 133
2000	44.57% 4,352	50.79% 4,960	4.64% 453
1996	40.94% 3,544	45.84% 3,968	13.23% 1,145
1992	28.47% 2,745	47.78% 4,607	23.76% 2,291
1988	32.60% 2,599	66.67% 5,315	0.73% 58
1984	25.02% 1,771	74.65% 5,283	0.32% 23
1980	28.82% 1,815	59.34% 3,737	11.85% 746
1976	36.05% 2,025	63.20% 3,550	0.75% 42
1972	25.87% 1,329	71.92% 3,695	2.22% 114
1968	33.15% 1,527	57.47% 2,647	9.38% 432
1964	49.78% 1,960	50.22% 1,977	0.00% 0
1960	35.51% 1,116	64.49% 2,027	0.00% 0
1956	20.66% 389	79.34% 1,494	0.00% 0

Voter registration and party enrollment as of October 26, 2021
Party	Active voters	Inactive voters	Total voters	Percentage
Republican	3,673	168	3,841	26.70%
Democratic	3,188	171	3,359	23.36%
Unaffiliated	6,627	311	6,938	48.24%
Minor parties	234	10	244	1.70%
Total	13,722	660	14,382	100%

== Education ==
Monroe Public Schools oversees public education and includes approximately 4,000 students, in three elementary schools (Fawn Hollow, Monroe Elementary, and Stepney Elementary), two middle schools (Jockey Hollow and STEM Academy), and one high school (Masuk High School).

In 2011, STEM Academy was opened at Masuk High School as an additional middle school option for Monroe's 6th, 7th, and 8th graders.

Chalk Hill Middle School housed Monroe's 5th and 6th graders from 1969 to 2011 (when it was closed due to shifting population and budget issues). From 2012 to 2016, Chalk Hill was the home of Sandy Hook Elementary School in Newtown following the December 14, 2012, shooting.

== Media ==
- The town of Monroe owns and operates the FM radio station WMNR.
- The Monroe Courier was the weekly town newspaper until it was shut down in October 2018.
- The two local online newspaper are the Monroe Patch and the Monroe Sun.

== Infrastructure ==
=== Roads ===
- Connecticut Route 25, Main Street, runs across Monroe from Upper Stepney to the Trumbull town line. The highway starts in Brookfield/Danbury and runs to Bridgeport. From Brookfield through Monroe, it is a 2-lane road, and just over the Monroe-Trumbull border within Trumbull, it becomes a 6-lane freeway which connects to Interstate 95.
- Connecticut Route 34 runs through the northern (Stevenson) section of Monroe. The route begins in Newtown and ends in New Haven, where it connects with I-91 and I-95.
  - Stevenson Dam, which holds back Lake Zoar, and is the bridge for CT Route 34 across the Housatonic River
- Connecticut Route 59 begins at its intersection with Route 25 in Monroe and travels south through Easton and Fairfield, where it ends in Bridgeport.
- Connecticut Route 110 begins in Monroe at its intersection with Route 111, then travels through Shelton before ending in Stratford.
- Connecticut Route 111, Monroe Turnpike, begins at its intersection with Route 34 in Monroe and runs south to Trumbull, where it terminates just north of Bridgeport at the Merritt Parkway.

=== Bus ===
The Greater Bridgeport Transit Authority provides bus service for Monroe.

=== Train ===
Two train stations are located near Monroe:

- Bridgeport, 10.7 miles away.
- Derby–Shelton, 6.4 miles away.

Both stations are served by Metro-North Railroad. Bridgeport station is served by the New Haven Line, Amtrak's Northeast Corridor and the Vermonter. Derby–Shelton station is served only by the Waterbury Branch. Both stations are easily accessible by bus routes or driving. The New Haven Railroad used to serve the town.

=== Parks and recreation ===
The Monroe Parks and Recreation Department manages Monroe's parks.

- Webb Mountain Park, a municipal park with hiking trails and campsites
- William E. Wolfe Park, a town park located on Cutlers Farm Road and on the northern end of Cross Hill Road. The park includes a public pool, four baseball fields, a football field, a basketball court, a playground, and a hiking trail that leads to Great Hollow Lake. The park includes a barbecue set up on the grass, and a nearby pavilion. Great Hollow Lake is located in the south-western area of the park.
- The Housatonic Railway Trail is an approximately five-mile section of the scenic walking and biking Pequonnock River trail that runs from Great Hollow Lake in Wolfe Park through the Newtown Town line.

=== Emergency services ===
==== Fire department ====
Monroe is protected by three independent and all-volunteer fire departments operating out of six fire stations.

In 1916, 45 men and women formed the first volunteer fire company in Monroe, the Stepney Volunteer Fire Company. In 1923 the Stepney Company built its own firehouse, which housed their first fire truck. It is the only Ladder Company in the Town of Monroe. Also in 1923, the Monroe Volunteer Fire Department was established.

==== Emergency medical services ====
Monroe is served by the Monroe Volunteer Emergency Medical Service, founded 1977.

==== Police department ====
Officially organized in 1952, the Monroe Police Department operates out of Monroe Town Hall.

== Notable people ==
- Mike Gminski, former Duke basketball standout and NBA player
- Stephen Kellogg, musician
- Eric George Lopez (aka ericdoa), singer/songwriter, rapper and record producer
- Mary O'Hara, author of My Friend Flicka and other books; lived on an estate called Tyrawley on Bagburn Hill Road for nearly 20 years
- Ed and Lorraine Warren, paranormal investigators and authors
- Ed Wojna, former Major League pitcher

== Images ==
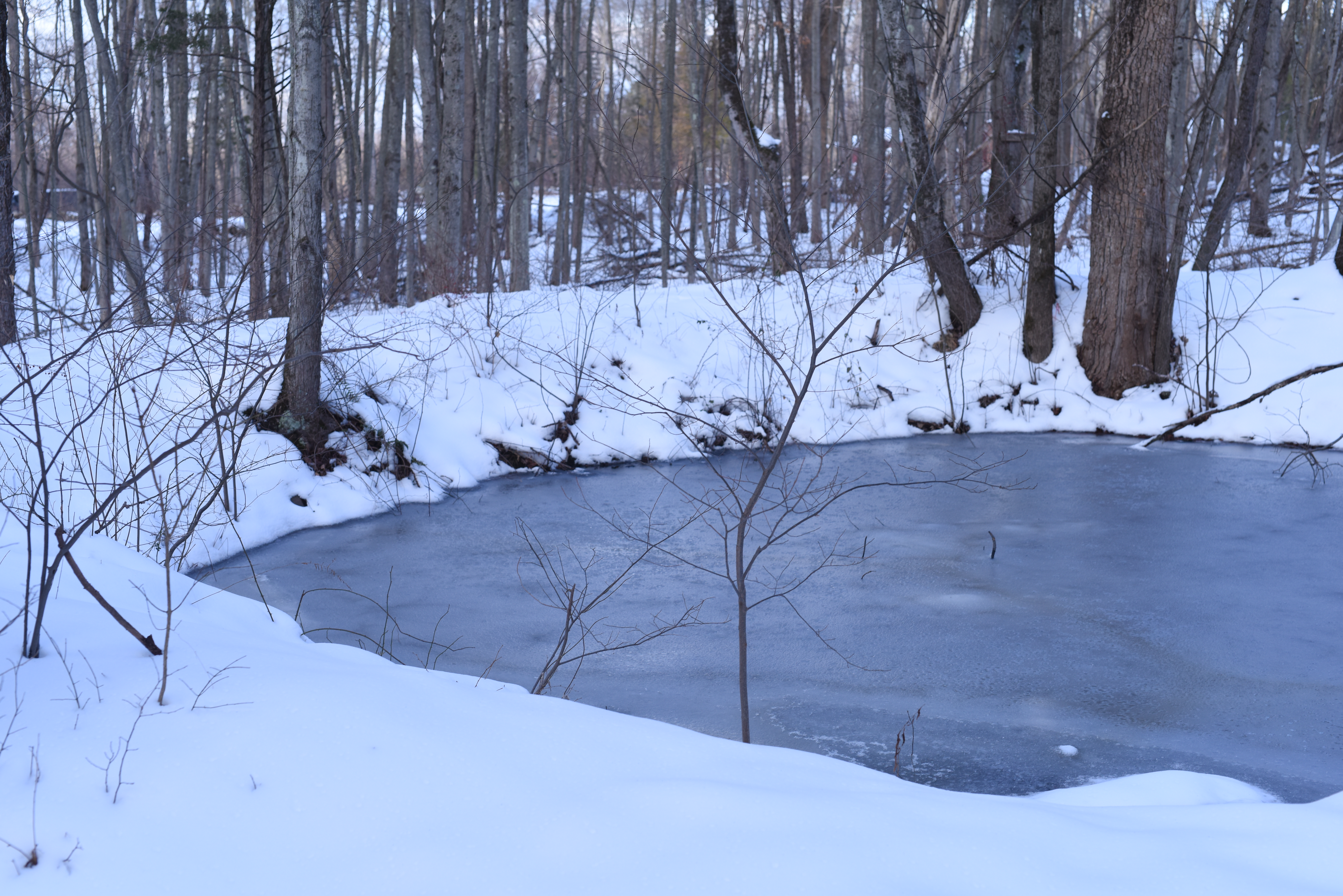
Webb Mountain Park Discovery Zone, Classroom Court pond

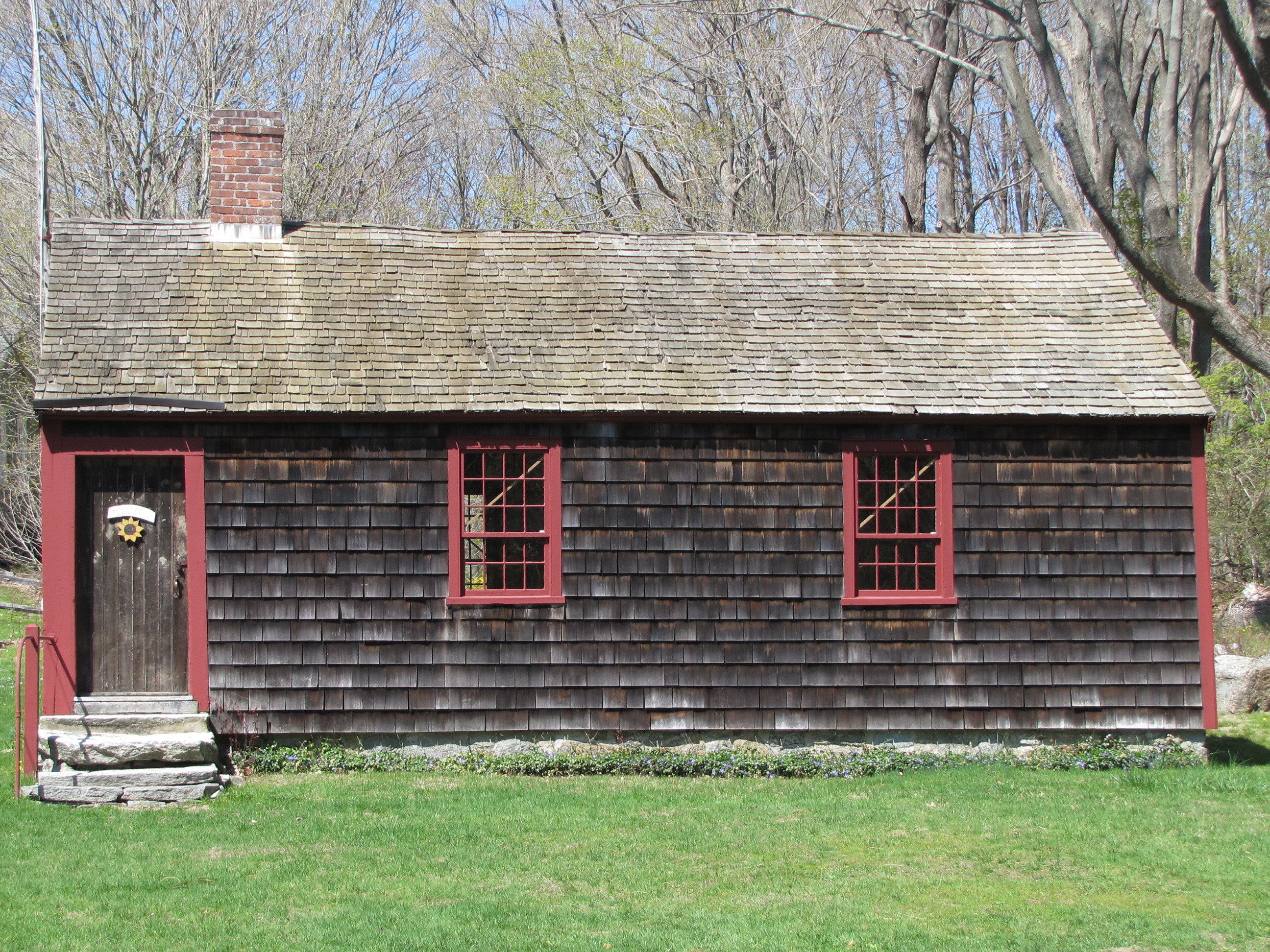
The East Village Barn Hill Schoolhouse of 1790

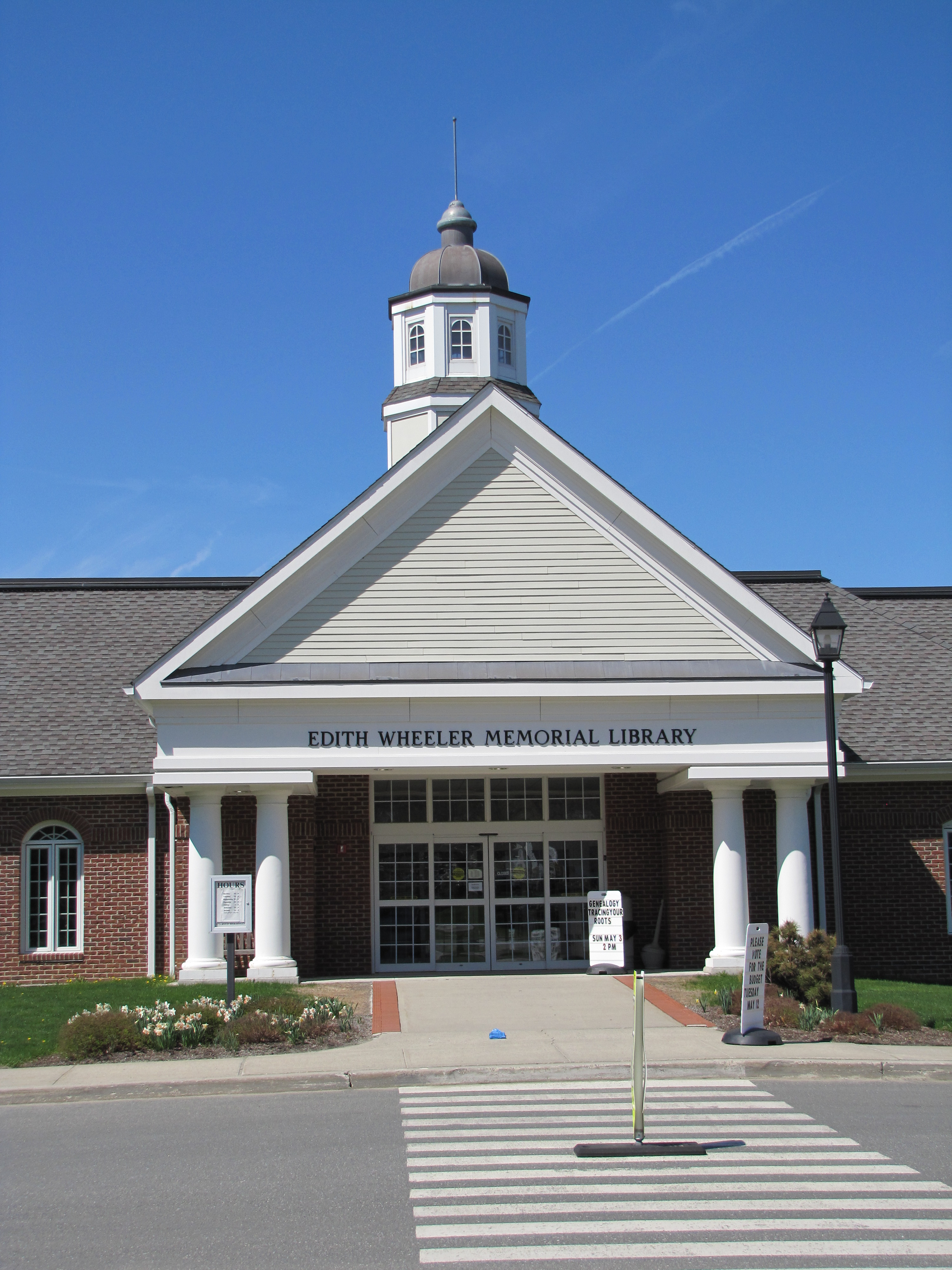
Edith Wheeler Memorial Library

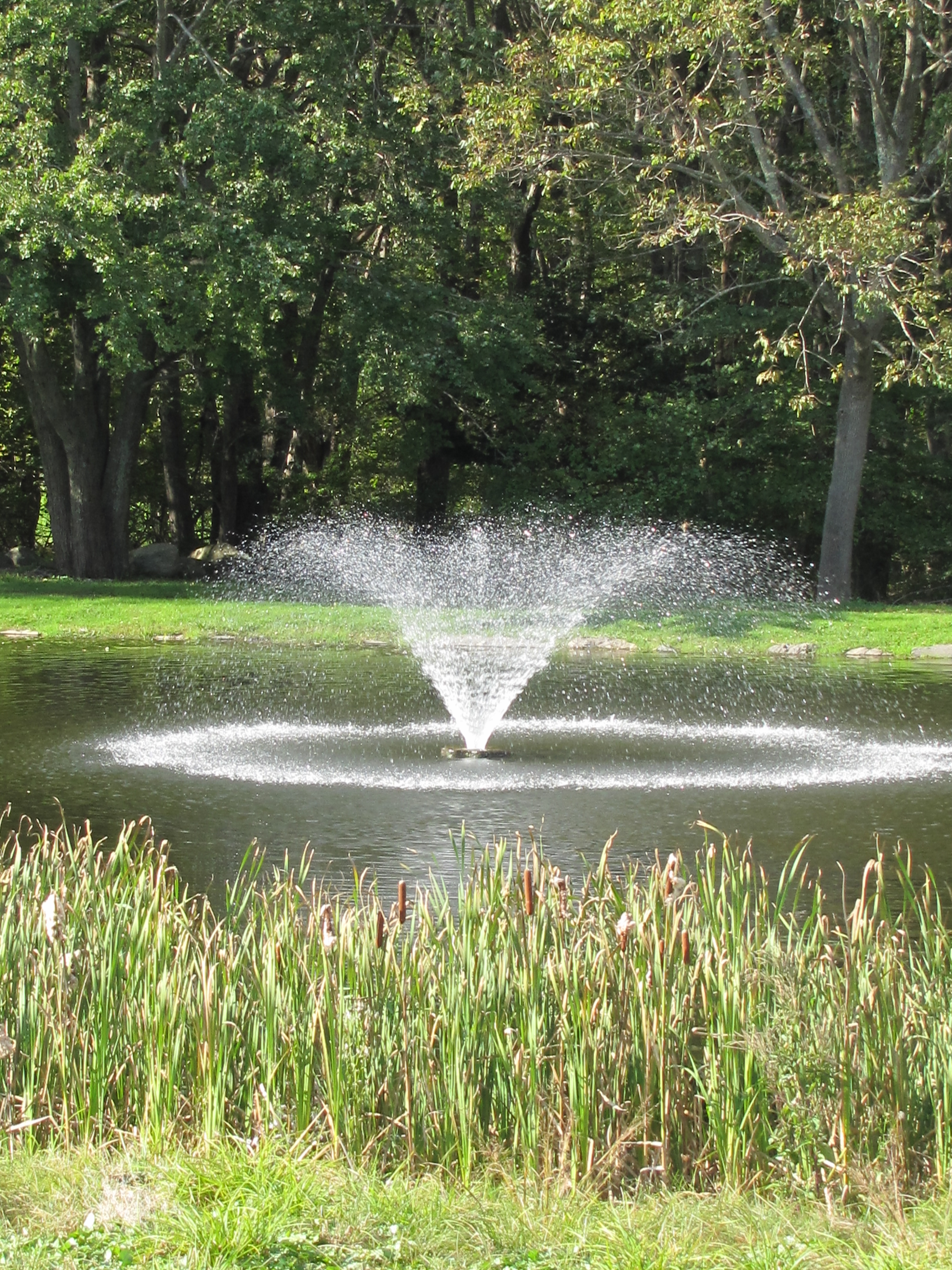
Fountain and pond at Wolfe Park

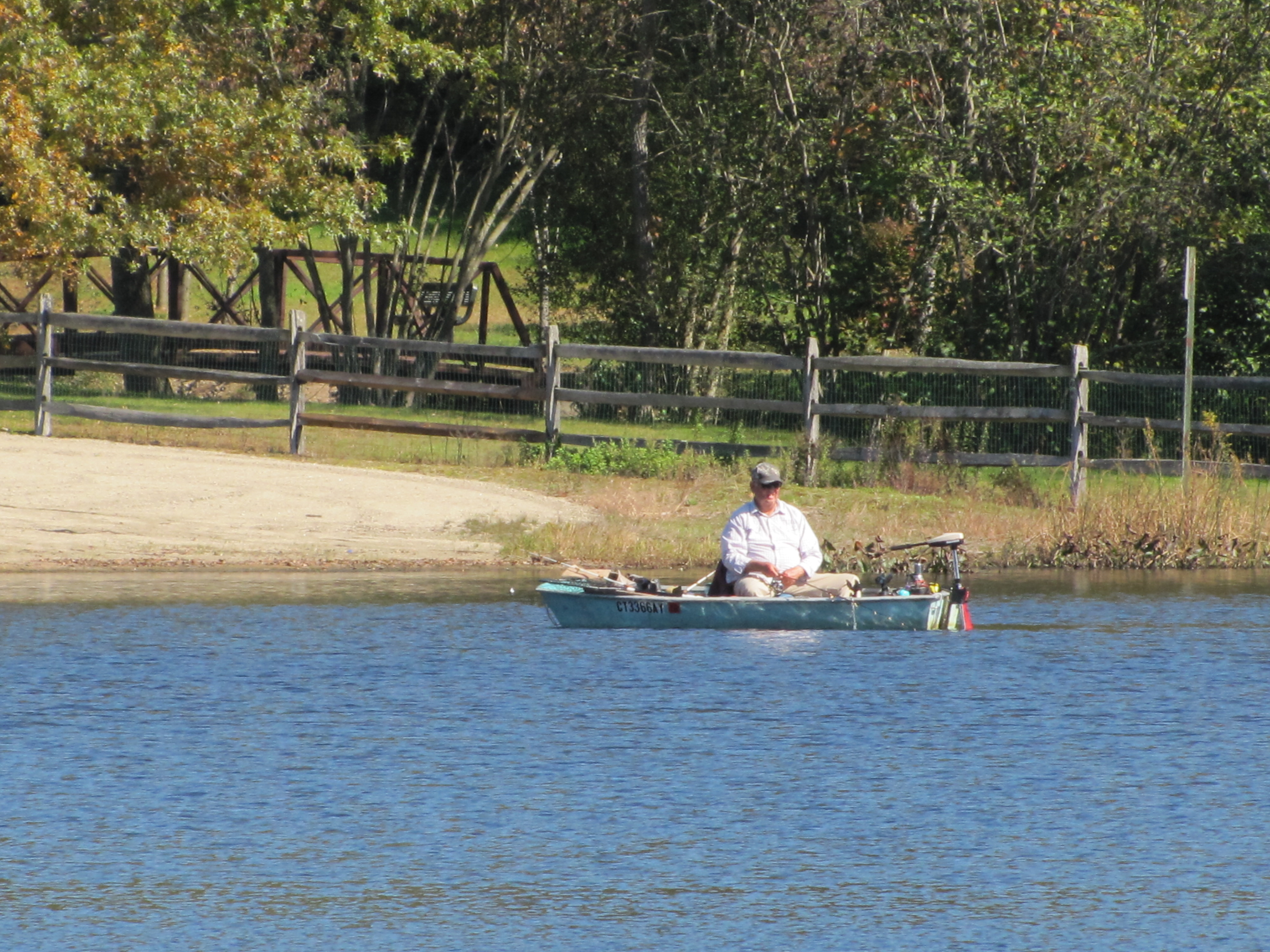
Great Hollow Lake in Monroe

== See also ==
Shackelford, Lauren Mascarenhas, Caroll Alvarado, Robert. “Connecticut Flooding: State of Emergency Declared after 2 Killed and ‘Hundreds’ Evacuated during Flash Flooding.” CNN, 19 Aug. 2024,
